= List of 2 Days & 1 Night episodes =

2 Days & 1 Night logo

The following is a list of episodes of the South Korean reality-variety show 2 Days & 1 Night, a segment of Happy Sunday, broadcast on the KBS2 every Sunday at 6:25pm KST. The show began airing in HD on May 23, 2010. Episodes are aired with English subtitles not only in episode reruns, but also episodes uploaded on KBS World's official YouTube channel.

There were 232 episodes aired during Season 1, which ended on February 25, 2012. Season 2 began airing on March 4, 2012, ended on December 15, 2013, and had 89 episodes. Season 3 began airing on December 22, 2013, ended on March 10, 2019, and had 257 episodes. Season 4 began airing on December 8, 2019, and currently has aired 343 episodes.

Note: The episode numbers indicated below are reckoned from when this segment was revamped as 2 Days & 1 Night, and do not take the first 12 episodes of its predecessor, Are You Ready, into consideration.

== Season 1 ==
=== 2007 ===
List of episodes in 2007 (Episodes 1–23)

Trip #	Episode #	Happy Sunday episode #	Date aired	Place visited	Comments
1	1–2	143–144	August 5, 2007; August 12, 2007	Yeongdong, Chungcheongbuk-do	First episode as "2 Days & 1 Night"; Cast: Kang Ho-dong, Lee Soo-geun, Eun Jiwon, Kim Jong-min, Noh Hong-chul, Ji Sang-ryul, Sanggeun (dog mascot)
2	3–4	145–146	August 19, 2007; August 26, 2007	Jukdo, Tongyeong, Gyeongsangnam-do	
3	5–7	147–149	September 2, 2007; September 9, 2007; September 16, 2007	Jeonju Korean Village, Jeonju, Jeollabuk-do	Live broadcast of KBS Jeonju Broadcast Station with Noh Hong-chul as special guest; Ji Sang-ryeol's last trip as a member
4	8–9	150–151	September 23, 2007; September 30, 2007	Deoksangi Valley, Jeongseon, Gangwon-do	Kim Young-chul as special guest; Kim Jong-min gets left behind at the Jecheon station; he later joins the crew at their base camp
5	10–12	152–154	October 7, 2007; October 14, 2007; October 21, 2007	Ulleungdo & Dokdo, Gyeongsangbuk-do	Dokdo Special; Shin Ji as special guest
6	13–14	155–156	October 28, 2007; November 4, 2007	Miryang, Gyeongsangnam-do	Kim C joins as a member; Noh Hong-chul's last trip; Experience in harvesting persimmons
7	15–17	157–159	November 11, 2007; November 18, 2007; November 25, 2007	Pyeongchang, Gangwon-do	Lee Seung-gi joins as a member; 1st Severe Winter Training Camp
8	18	160	December 2, 2007	Haeundae Beach, Busan	Kim Jong-min's last trip before his mandatory military service, and goodbye message to 2 Days & 1 Night
9	19–20	161–162	December 9, 2007; December 16, 2007	Gageodo, Sinan, Jeollanam-do	MC Mong joins as a member; Visit to Gageo Elementary School
10	21–23	163–165	December 23, 2007; December 30, 2007; January 6, 2008	Kamsung Village, Hwacheon, Gangwon-do	Visit and overnight stay at novelist Lee Oi-soo's home; "Low Quality Table Tennis Match"

=== 2008 ===
List of episodes in 2008 (Episodes 24–72)

Trip #	Episode #	Happy Sunday episode #	Date aired	Place visited	Comments
11	24–25	166–167	January 13, 2008; January 20, 2008	Jukbyeon, Uljin, Gyeongsangbuk-do	Experience crab fishing
12	26–28	168–170	January 27, 2008; February 3, 2008; February 10, 2008	Dongbaek Village, Yeonggwang, Jeollanam-do	Visit and clean-up of the 2007 Korea oil spill; First 2 nights, 3 days filming
13	29–30	171–172	February 17, 2008; February 24, 2008	Sangsa Village, Gurye, Jeollanam-do	Experience living in olden day homes; Visit to the town; Lee Soo-geun's baby announcement
14	31–32	173–174	March 2, 2008; March 9, 2008	Jejudo & Udo, Jeju-do	3 members travel by plane while the other 3 take a 13-hour ship to get to Jejudo; Visit to Udo cut short due to bad weather
15	33–34	175–176	March 16, 2008; March 23, 2008	Nanjido, Han River, Mapo-gu, Seoul	Shooting filmed after Lee Soo-geun's wedding; 1st Freestyle Trip led by Eun Jiwon; Attend the dubbing session in KBS headquarters
16	35–36	177–178	March 30, 2008; April 6, 2008	Geochang, Gyeongsangnam-do	Kim C was absent for the trip due to the death of his father; Experience in harvesting strawberries; Competed in KBS1's National Singing Contest; Special appearance of Song Hae
17	37–38	179–180	April 13, 2008; April 20, 2008	Yeoseodo, Wando, Jeollanam-do	2 nights, 3 days filming
18	39–40	181–182	April 27, 2008; May 4, 2008	Donggang, Jeongseon, Gangwon-do	Surprise visit for 8 students at a school in Donggang
19	41–42	183–184	May 11, 2008; May 18, 2008	Mungyeong, Gyeongsangbuk-do	Visit and hold an impromptu guerrilla concert at Chungju National University; Live connection/broadcast of KBS-2TV Music Bank with MC Mong winning first place; Visit to the set of KBS drama series, The Great King, Sejong
20	43–44	185–186	May 25, 2008; June 1, 2008	Suwon, Yeoju, Gapyeong County, Hanam, Ansan, Hwaseong, Paju & Uijeongbu, Gyeonggi-do	Visit Yeoju's Silleuksa (Buddhist temple); Visit the Han River along Gapyeong County; Visit Hanam's Namhansanseong ("South Han Mountain Fortress"); Visit Ansan's Daebu Island; Visit Paju's Hyeeri Town; Experiencing Uijeongbu's Budae jjigae ("army base stew")
21	45–47	187–189	June 8, 2008; June 15, 2008; June 22, 2008	Daecheong Island, Baengnyeong Island, Ongjin County, Incheon	2 nights, 3 days filming; First time using their camper van; Visit the Republic of Korea Marine Corps based on the island; MC Mong and his manager, Lee Heon-seok, catching a mullet fish in Daecheongdo
22	48–50	190–192	June 29, 2008; July 6, 2008; July 13, 2008	Baekdusan, on the Korean Chinese border	First international trip; 4 nights, 5 days filming; Visit the birthplace of Korean poet, Yun Dong-ju; Held a guerrilla concert at Yongjeong Middle School
23	51–52	193–194	July 20, 2008; July 27, 2008	Jangsu County, Jeollabuk-do	Family (of 4) trip concept; Live broadcast of Lee Seung-gi and Lee Soo-geun as guests on KBS2 FM Hong Jin-kyung's Radio; Hidden camera prank on the new PD
24	53	194–195	July 27, 2008; August 3, 2008	Inje, Gangwon-do	Friendship trip concept; Visit Kangwon National University
—	54	196	August 17, 2008	Indoor gymnasium in Namyangju, Gyeonggi-do	2008 Summer Olympics' Special; Special appearances by Lee Eun-kyung, Kim Dong-moon, Ahn Jae-hyung and Jiao Zhimin
25	55–56	197–198	August 24, 2008; August 31, 2008	Yeongdong, Chungcheong-do	2 Days & 1 Night's 1st anniversary; Memory trip concept; Kim Hye-yeon as a special guest for the live wake-up song
26	57	198–199	August 31, 2008; September 7, 2008	Salty Town, Sinan County, Jeollanam-do	Salt farming; Experience working in "quicksand"/"muddy" area
27	58–59	200–201	September 14, 2008; September 21, 2008	Samsudong Gwinemi Town, Taebaek, Gangwon-do	Experience harvesting napa cabbages
28	60–61	202–203	September 28, 2008; October 5, 2008	Busan	Experience in "low-cost package" tours; Visit the Sajik Baseball Stadium; Lending a hand to help the baseball team; Experience selling jalgachi in the market; Experience catching Conger eels
29	62–63	204–205	October 12, 2008; October 19, 2008	Samcheok, Gangwon-do	Visit the town; Experience living in a Neowa house
30	64–65	206–207	October 26, 2008; November 2, 2008	Chuncheon, Gangwon-do	2nd Freestyle Trip (MT concept) led by MC Mong later replaced by Lee Seung-gi; Visit Namyangju's studio
31	66–67	208–209	November 9, 2008; November 16, 2008	Inje, Gangwon-do	2nd Severe Winter Camp Training
32	68	210	November 23, 2008	Yedang Reservoir, Yesan County, Chungcheongnam-do	Ji Sang-ryul and Sang-don the dog (Sanggeun's son) as special guest; Fishing tour; Lee Soo-geun getting his driver's license for large vehicles (buses)
33	69–70	211–212	November 30, 2008; December 7, 2008	Nok Island & Oeyeon Island, Boryeong, Chungcheongnam-do	Stopped at Nok Island because of bad weather; Leaving Lee Seung-gi on Nok Island; Touring Indeciduous forest
34	71–72	213–214	December 14, 2008; December 21, 2008	Haenam, Jeollanam-do	Visit Yooseongwan's Daeheungsa (大興寺) (Buddhist temple)

=== 2009 ===
List of episodes in 2009 (Episodes 73–122)

Trip #	Episode #	Happy Sunday episode #	Date aired	Place visited	Comments
35	73–75	215–217	December 28, 2008; January 4, 2009; January 11, 2009	Gongju, Chungcheongnam-do	Park Chan-ho, MLB player, as a special guest; Tour to the Tomb of King Muryeong in Gyeryongsan; Recap of the 2008 KBS Entertainment Awards; Tour of Gongsanseong; Visit Gongju Middle School
36	76–77	218–219	January 18, 2009; January 25, 2009	Beolgyo, Boseong, Jeollanam-do	Visit the 5 traditional markets in Beolgyo; Experience in catching ark shells; Gas station fill-ups Surprise Event
37	78–79	220–221	February 1, 2009; February 8, 2009	Damyang County, Jeollanam-do	Visit Juknokwon and Jukhyang's cultural village (known for its bamboo forest)
38	80–81	222–223	February 15, 2009; February 22, 2009	Gapyeong County, Gyeonggi-do	1st Viewer's Special Trip; The 6 teams: Eun Jiwon - Gukak National High School's Dance team; Kang Ho-dong - Korea National Sport University's Women's Judo team; Lee Soo-geun - male nurses team; MC Mong - "8 princess' and 8 sons-in-law" team; Lee Seung-gi - elder women in high school team; Kim C - happy single mom's team; Baek Ji-young, Han Min-gwan, Kim Jae-wook, Lee Sang-ho, B2ST and Lee Sang-min as special guests for the concert
39	82	224	March 1, 2009	Oolwangee Beach & Yeongjong Island, Jung-gu, Incheon	Originally planned to go to Jeju Island, but flights were canceled due to bad weather; 3rd Freestyle Trip led by Lee Soo-geun
40	83–84	225–226	March 8, 2009; March 15, 2009	Jeju City & Seogwipo, Jeju-do	New Year's Special; "Low-cost package" tour (travel from Gimpo International Airport to Jeju International Airport); Visit Hyeopjae Beach; Visit Pyoseonri's Guest House
41	85–86	227–228	March 22, 2009; March 29, 2009	Gwangyang, Jeollanam-do	Visit the apricot blossoms; Ride the Saemaul-ho (train) from Yongsan Station to Guryegu station (求禮口驛)/Suncheon station (順天驛); News of the birth of Kang Ho-dong's son
42	87–88	229–230	April 5, 2009; April 12, 2009	Deokjeokdo, Ongjin County, Incheon	Leaving Eun Jiwon on Saseungbong Island; First experience of bivouac
43	89–90	231–232	April 19, 2009; April 26, 2009	Deoksangi Valley, Jeongseon, Gangwon-do	"Let's go together, my friend" Special Trip
44	91–92	233–234	May 3, 2009; May 10, 2009	Youngyangeup, Yeongyang County, Gyeongsangbuk-do	"Home Sweet Home" Special Trip; Experience in rural home stay
45	93–94	235–236	May 17, 2009; May 31, 2009	Naju, Jeollanam-do	Visit the Joseon Dynasty era governor's office in Naju; Kang Yumi and Ahn Young-mi as special guests for mission's briefing video; Due to the death of former South Korean President Roh Moo-hyun on May 23, 2009, the airing of Happy Sunday was canceled on May 24, 2009
46	95–96	237–238	June 7, 2009; June 14, 2009	Geoje, Gyeongsangbuk-do	Visit Jisim Island; Tour Hanryeo Marine National Park
47	97–98	239–240	June 21, 2009; June 28, 2009	Haman County, Gyeongsangbuk-do	1st Severe Heat Camp Training; Experience harvesting watermelons
48	99–100	241–242	July 5, 2009; July 12, 2009	inner Gwangwonri, Hongcheon, Gangwon-do	Visit Sambong's National Natural Forest; 2 Days & 1 Night 100th episode
49	101–102	243–244	July 19, 2009; July 26, 2009	Hwajang Town, Yeonggwang County, Jeollanam-do	Improvised Special Trip; Leaving Lee Seung-gi; Revisit the Mapado (Dongbaek Village) grandmothers
50	103–104	245–246	August 2, 2009; August 9, 2009	Baeduduk Village, Pyeongchang County, Gangwon-do	Farm stay Special Trip
51	105–107	247–249	August 16, 2009; August 31, 2009; September 6, 2009	Cheongsan Island, Wando, Jeollanam-do	Global/Foreigner's Special Trip; Due to the death of former South Korean President Kim Dae-jung on August 18, 2009, the airing of Happy Sunday was canceled for August 23, 2009 and variety-safety program, No. 1 was aired instead
52	107–108	249–250	September 6, 2009; September 13, 2009	Yecheon County, Gyeongsangbuk-do	Remembrance Special Trip
53	109–110	251–252	September 20, 2009; September 27, 2009	Yeongam, Jeollanam-do	Climbing Wolchulsan; Outdoor sleeping by the entire Production Team; Visit Hanok (Korean traditional house) village; Experience harvesting figs
54	111–112	253–254	October 4, 2009; October 11, 2009	Yeonpyeong, Ongjin County, Incheon	Chuseok Special; Experience catching crabs
55	113–114	255–256	October 18, 2009; October 25, 2009	Samcheok, Gangwon-do	Autumn Special
56	115–116	257–258	November 1, 2009; November 8, 2009	Jeju-do	A National Road Special; Introduction of a new camper van; Leaving Kim C on the road (Highway 1118) to travel to the base camp on foot
57	117–118	259–260	November 15, 2009; November 22, 2009	Yeongwol, Gangwon-do	Photograph mission with citizens; Observing the universe through the telescope at the Byulmaro Observatory
58	119–120	261–262	November 29, 2009; December 6, 2009	Geomundo, Yeosu, Jeollanam-do	The Production team and cast carry heavy camera and production equipment to Geomundo (Port Hamilton) Lighthouse
59	121–122	263–264	December 13, 2009; December 20, 2009	Inje, Gangwon-do	3rd Severe Winter Camp Training; Wake up mission was canceled due to heavy snow fall at dawn and the filming ended earlier; walking down the mountain amid the blizzards

=== 2010 ===
List of episodes in 2010 (Episodes 123–172)

Trip #	Episode #	Happy Sunday episode #	Date aired	Place visited	Comments
60	123–125	265–267	December 27, 2009; January 3, 2010; January 10, 2010	Gapyeong County, Gyeonggi-do	Kim Jong-min rejoins as a member; Severe Winter Encounter Camp; Park Chan-ho makes a special surprise guest re-appearance
61	126–127	268–269	January 17, 2010; January 24, 2010	Heuksando, Sinan County, Jeollanam-do	Leaving MC Mong and Kim Jong-min on Gageodo; Experience catching skate
62	128–129	270–271	January 31, 2010; February 7, 2010	Andong, Gyeongsangbuk-do	Visiting best 4 attractions in Andong; Experience playing Yangban and Nobi
63	130–132	272–274	February 14, 2010; February 21, 2010; February 28, 2010	Jeju-do	2nd Viewer's Special Trip; 2 nights, 3 days filming; The 7 teams: Korean national women's rugby team, An owner-driver cabby team of the Eunpyeong-gu in Seoul, 11 brother and sister team, The Universal ballet company team, Sangdong High school 3rd year class student team for 12 straight years classmate, Former high school weightlifting club old boys team born in 1959, The Korea Aerospace University student team; The 2 teams (Invited for staff qualification): Gukak National High School's Dance team, Korea National Sport University's Women's Judo team; Baek Ji-young, Kim Tae-woo as special guests for the concert
64	133–134	275–276	March 7, 2010; March 14, 2010	Ganghwa County, Incheon	Eun Jiwon and MC Mong shave their heads; Notification of postponement of Antarctica trip; Video conference with King Sejong Station researchers
65	135–136	277–278	March 21, 2010; March 28, 2010	Tongyeong, Gyeongsangnam-do	Visiting the eastern beach; Eun Jiwon's wedding announcement; Experience fish farming; 3rd bokbulbok cast vs staff
66	137–140	279–282	April 11, 2010; May 2, 2010; May 9, 2010; May 16, 2010	South Korea's coastline: Song Ji-ho Beach, Goseong, Gangwon-do; Abay Town, Sokcho, Gangwon-do; Jeongseon, Gangwon-do; Goraebul Beach, Yeongdeok, Gyeongsangbuk-do; Gyeongju Historic Areas, Gyeongju, Gyeongsangbuk-do; Minaribat, Cheongdo, Gyeongsangbuk-do; Choechampandaek, Hadong, Gyeongsangbuk-do; Sunchon Bay, Suncheon, Jeollanam-do; Jukgokmyeon hahanri, Gokseong, Jeollanam-do; Green tea field, Boseong, Jeollanam-do; Saturday Market, Jangheung, Jeollanam-do; Namdo minbak, Hampyeong, Jeollanam-do; Gurye, Jeollanam-do; Gwanghanru, Namwon, Jeollabuk-do; Jeondong Catholic Cathedral, Jeonju, Jeollabuk-do; Geumsansa, Gimje, Jeollabuk-do; Gunsan, Jeollabuk-do; Ungcheoneup, Boryeong, Chungcheongnam-do; Younghaemyeon, Yeongdeok; Intercity Bus Terminal, Pohang, Gyeongsangbuk-do; Yeongcheon, Gyeongsangbuk-do; Chokseokru, Jinju, Gyeongsangnam-do	Korea's Coastline Special; 3 nights, 4 days filming; Leaving Eun Jiwon behind on the second day; Freestyle trip on the third day; "One Strong Heart" Team (Kang Ho-dong & Lee Seung-gi) – wireless touring, "AH.YEO.MO" Team (Kim C, Lee Soo-geun, & MC Mong) – process touring, "Smurf" Team (Eun Jiwon & Kim Jong-min) – temple stay and traditional experience touring스머프팀(은지원, 김종민) 템플스테이, 전통체험; Due to the Baengnyeong incident on March 26, 2010, the airing of Happy Sunday was canceled for April 4, 2010, April 18 and 25, 2010
67	141–143	283–285	May 23, 2010; May 30, 2010; June 6, 2010	Gyeongju, Gyeongsangbuk-do	Studying Trip Special; Kim C's last trip and farewell; Starts broadcasting in High Definition (HD); Kang Ho-dong's first time being left out
68	144–145	286–287	June 13, 2010; June 20, 2010	Baekahsan, Hwasun, Jeollanam-do	1st Rally trip to strengthen unity; Experience wildlife
69	146, 148	288, 290	June 27, 2010; July 11, 2010	Okcheon, Chungcheongbuk-do	Cycling trip; Kang Ho-dong – 35 km, Lee Soo-geun – 65 km, Eun Jiwon – 5 km, MC Mong – 20 km, Kim Jong-min – 80 km, Lee Seung-gi – 35 km
70	149–150	291–292	July 18, 2010; July 25, 2010	Uiseong, Gyeongsangbuk-do	2nd Severe Heat Camp Training
71	151–152	293–294	August 1, 2010; August 8, 2010	Seosan, Chungcheongnam-do	Summer Special; Bok-bul-bok Festival; Special appearance of Lee Sang-min and Lee Sang-ho; Leaving Eun Jiwon behind after being chosen during the Bok-bul-bok game
72	153–154	295–296	August 15, 2010; August 22, 2010	Uljin, Bonghwa, Gyeongsangbuk-do	Offroad travel; Leaving all six members behind on the roadside
73	155–157	297–299	August 29, 2010; September 5, 2010; September 12, 2010	Jiri Mountain	Going to Jiri Mountain Special; 1N2D Documentary at Dulle Pass; 1st course – Kim Jong-min, 2nd course – Lee Seung-gi, 3rd course – Kang Ho-dong & Eun Jiwon, 4th course – MC Mong, 5th course – Lee Soo-geun; Narration – Kim C; Helicopter film shooting over Sanghwang Town
74	158	300	September 19, 2010	Buseokmyeon, Yeongju, Gyeongsangbuk-do	Beauty of Korea Special; All of MC Mong's parts edited out due to military draft; also his last episode on the show
75	159–160	301–302	September 26, 2010; October 3, 2010	Jongno-gu, Seoul	Day in Seoul Special; Jongno-gu 1 vs. 1 race mission; Kang Ho-dong – market square, Lee Soo-geun – Bukak Mountain castle road, Eun Jiwon – Buamdong Baeksashil river, Kim Jong-min – Bukchan 8 view, Lee Seung-gi – Ewha town
76	161–162	303–304	October 10, 2010; October 17, 2010	Yangyang, Gangwon-do	Autumn Music (Sentimental Romance) Travel Special; Eun Jiwon and Kim Jong-min climbing Seoraksan
77	163–164	305–306	October 24, 2010; October 31, 2010	Sinan, Jeollanam-do	Self-sufficiency Special; Kang Ho-dong – barnacle collecting, Lee Soo-geun – potato digging, Eun Jiwon – Baemal collecting, Kim Jong-min – bass fishing, Lee Seung-gi – drying wakame
78	165–166	307–308	November 7, 2010; November 14, 2010	Inje University, Gimhae, Gyeongsangnam-do	Original plan was to visit Ulleungdo but canceled due to bad weather; Special appearance by former-ssireum player Lee Man-gi; Special ssireum match: Kang Ho-dong vs. Lee Man-gi
79	167–168	309–310	November 21, 2010; November 28, 2010	Jangheung, Jeollanam-do	Gourmet travel; Cheongwansan climbing; Clam bibimbap race
80	169–171	311–313	December 5, 2010; December 12, 2010; December 19, 2010	Incheon; Daejeon; Gwangju; Daegu; Ulsan; Busan	6 City Special; Relay mission; All members – opening, lodging, and closing scene at Daejeon, Kang Ho-dong – Daegu and special appearance of Yang Joon-Hyuk, Lee Soo-geun – Gwangju and special appearance of Lee Jong-Beom, Eun Jiwon – Incheon, Kim Jong-min – Ulsan, Lee Seung-gi – Busan and special appearance of Lee Dae-Ho
81	171–172	313–314	December 19, 2010; December 26, 2010	Inje, Gangwon-do	Winter Vacation Special; Complete free travel

=== 2011 ===
List of episodes in 2011 (Episodes 173–223)

Trip #	Episode #	Happy Sunday episode #	Date aired	Place visited	Comments
82	173–175	315–317	January 2, 2011; January 9, 2011; January 16, 2011	Kyeongpodae, Gangneung, Gangwon-do	Foreign Workers Special
83	176–177	318–319	January 23, 2011; January 30, 2011	Garisan, Duchonmyeon, Hongcheon, Gangwon-do	Winter mountain villa trip; Delivery race
84	178–179	320–321	February 6, 2011; February 13, 2011	Seoraksan, Sokcho, Gangwon-do	Winter Mountain Hike Special
85	180–181	322–323	February 20, 2011; February 27, 2011	Ho-do, Ohcheonmyeon, Boryeong, Chungcheongnam-do; Somaemul-do, Hansanmyeon, Tongyeong, Gyeongsangnam-do; Sonjuk-do, Samsanmyeon, Yeosu, Jeollanam-do; Ulleung County, Ulleungdo, Gyeongsangbuk-do; Saraohreum, Chocheoneub, Jeju City, Jeju-do	5 Great Korean Island Tour; Eun Jiwon Documentary 3-day Special; Relay Race; All member except Eun Jiwon meet at Mokpo as final destination. Lee Seung-gi – Jeju-do, Eun Jiwon – Ho-do, Kang Ho-dong – Somaemul-do, Kim Jong-min – Sonjuk-Do, Lee Soo-geun – Ulleungdo
86	182–183	324–325	March 6, 2011; March 13, 2011	Yangyang, Gangwon-do	New Member Orientation Special; Uhm Tae-woong
87	184–185	326–327	March 20, 2011; March 27, 2011	Ulleungdo, Gyeongsang-do	Delivery Race
88	186–188	328–330	April 3, 2011; April 10, 2011; April 17, 2011	Seogwipo, Jeju-do	Photo mission race; Kim Jong-min participates in a pre-visit to the area (due to losing previous mission); Humanitarian trip; Museopdang and Babodang formed
89	188–190	330–332	April 17, 2011; April 24, 2011; May 1, 2011	Namhae, Gyeongsangnam-do	Best Spring Dish Award; Kang Ho-dong – glue 100 pair of doll eyes for sesame oil, Lee Soo-geun – find a karaoke place and sing a song and get at least 79 point for soybean paste, Eun Jiwon – play Tetris at an arcade and get first place for rice, Kim Jong-min – eating noodles by a German cheolsun village for dalrae, Lee Seung-gi – eating Bugles-shaped chips in 5 seconds for gochujang (Korean condiment), Uhm Tae-woong – bow 108 times at Boriam hall for radish; 6 members vs. Production Team on three kinds of game: soccer (win), jokgu (lost), relay race (lost)
90	191–192	333–334	May 8, 2011; May 15, 2011	Cheongyang, Chungcheongnam-do	Museopdang vs Babodang King race
91	193–195	335–337	May 22, 2011; May 29, 2011; June 5, 2011	Yeongwol, Gangwon-do	Actress Special (Yum Jung-ah, Choi Ji-woo, Lee Hye-young, Kim Soo-mi, Kim Ha-neul, Seo Woo)
92	196–197	338–339	June 12, 2011; June 19, 2011	Gangneung, Gangwon-do	Supporting Actor Special (Sung Dong-il, Kim Jung-tae, Ahn Gil-kang, Jo Sung-ha, Sung Ji-ru, Go Chang-seok)
93	198–199	340–341	June 26, 2011; July 3, 2011	Jindo Island, Jeollanam-do	Analog Theme
94	200–201	342–343	July 10, 2011; July 17, 2011	Gochang, Jeollabuk-do	200th Episode Commemorative Special; Kang Ho-dong – watermelons, Uhm Tae-woong – raspberries, Lee Soo-geun – peaches, Eun Jiwon – potatoes, Kim Jong-min & Lee Seung-gi – corn
95	202–204	345–347	July 31, 2011; August 7, 2011; August 14, 2011	Uong Ddo Falls, Seogwipo, Jeju-do; Jeong Bang Falls, Seogwipo, Jeju-do; Ssang Falls, Donghae City, Gangwon-do; 1st Juwangsan Falls, Budongmyeon, Cheongsong, Gyeongsangbuk-do; Sambuyeon Falls, Kalmaleub, Cheorwon, Gangwon-do; Heaven Falls, Mount Sorak, Sokcho, Gangwon-do; Bulil Falls, Jirisan, Hwagaemyeon, Hadong, Gyeongsangnam-do; Suok Falls, Wonpoongri, Yeonpoongmyeon, Goesan, Chungcheongbuk-do	Summer Falls Special; Kang Ho-dong – Heaven Falls, Uhm Tae-woong – Bulil Falls, Lee Soo-geun – 1st Juwangsan Falls, Eun Jiwon – Sambuyeon Falls, Kim Jong-min – Suok Falls, Lee Seung-gi – Ssang Falls
96	205–206	348–349	August 21, 2011; August 28, 2011	Kobe, Japan; Inje, Gangwon-do	The 1st part of the episode showed footage from Lee Seung-gi and Lee Soo-geun's trip to Japan. Lee Seung-gi won a trip abroad during the last episode's radio station challenge, and he picked Lee Soo-geun to accompany him. They met up with baseball player Park Chan-ho.; The 2nd part of the episode introduces the 3rd Annual Viewer's Tour, with guest MCs Baek Ji-young, Jun Hyun-moo, Sung Si-kyung and Kim Byung-man.
97	207–210	350–353	September 4, 2011; September 11, 2011; September 18, 2011; September 25, 2011	Chuncheon, Gangwon-do; Busan	For the 3rd Annual Viewers' Tour, 100 participants from age 0-100 were picked among the thousands of applicants.; Each MC is assigned to be team captain of one team, composed of viewers representing a particular decade: Jun Hyun-moo - Viewers aged 0–9, Baek Ji-young - Viewers aged 10–19, Kang Ho-dong - Viewers aged 20–29, Uhm Tae-woong - Viewers aged 30–39, Lee Seung-gi - Viewers aged 40–49, Kim Byung-man - Viewers aged 50–59, Lee Soo-geun - Viewers aged 60–69, Eun Jiwon - Viewers aged 70–79, Kim Jong-min - Viewers aged 80–89, Sung Si-kyung - Viewers aged 90–100 (plus a special guest aged 102); This also turned out to be Kang Ho-dong's last episode. He did not return to film the next episode after allegations of tax evasion were made against him.
98	211–212	354–355	October 2, 2011; October 9, 2011		5-Day Farmer's Market Tour (first episode without Kang Ho-dong)
99	213–214	356–357	October 16, 2011; October 23, 2011	Namsan, Gyeongju, Gyeongsangbuk-do	7 Buddhist Treasures of Namsan (with guest, history professor Yoo Hong-joon)
100	215–216	358–359	October 30, 2011; November 6, 2011	Yeongwol, Gangwon Province	Remote Village Special; Travel to Gajung Village
101	217–219	360–362	November 13, 2011; November 20, 2011; November 27, 2011	Tongyeong, Gyeongsangnam-do; Wanju, Jeollabuk-do; Jiri Mountain	Kimchi Road; Autumn Leaves Special; Lee Soo-geun: Wanju, Kim Jong-min: Mt. Jiri
102	219	362	November 27, 2011	Wanju / Sunchang / Gochang, Jeollabuk-do; Gurye, Jeollanam-do; Jung-gu, Seoul	Autumn Road
103	219–221	362–364	November 27, 2011; December 4, 2011; December 11, 2011	Gangneung, Gangwon-do	City Tour of Gangneung, birthplace of Heo Gyun (author of Tale of Hong Gildong) and his sister, poet Heo Nanseolheon; Lee Seung-gi: Coffee Street, Kim Jong-min: food tasting at the local market, Eun Jiwon: Edison Museum, Uhm Tae-woong: seafood market, Lee Soo-geun: Ojukheon House
104	222–223	365–366	December 18, 2011; December 25, 2011	Taebaek Mountain	"Flash Trips" Photo Missions; Lee Seung-gi: ducks in a group dance, Kim Jong-min: family of 4 cranes, Eun Jiwon: capture a rainbow, Uhm Tae-woong: capture an Omega Sunrise, Lee Soo-geun: ocean of clouds at the peak of Mount Taebaek

=== 2012 ===
List of episodes in 2012 (Episodes 224–232)

Trip #	Episode #	Happy Sunday episode #	Date aired	Place visited	Comments
105	224–226	367–369	January 1, 2012; January 8, 2012; January 15, 2012	Gangneung City, Gangwon-do: Gyeongpo Beach; Buyeondong Village	Celebrity Friend Special; Uhm Tae-woong - actor Lee Sun-kyun, Lee Seung-gi - actor Lee Seo-jin, Lee Soo-geun - soccer player Lee Keun-Ho, Eun Jiwon - soccer player Lee Dong-Gook, Kim Jong-min - singer Jang Woo-hyuk; Winter Camp Training / Cold Weather Training day (Base camp: A remote control village); SUV Team: Lee Soo-geun, Lee Keun-Ho, Lee Seung-gi, Lee Seo-jin, Lee Sun-kyun; Compact Car Team: Kim Jong-min, Jang Woo-hyuk, Eun Jiwon, Lee Dong-Gook, Uhm Tae-woong
106	227–228	370–371	January 22, 2012; January 29, 2012	Hongseong, Chungcheongnam-do; Jangheung, Jeollanam-do; Tongyeong, Gyeongsangnam-do; Pohang, Gyeongsangbuk-do; Inje, Gangwon Province	1st theme: Korea's Winter Dining Table; Uhm Tae-woong - Hongseong's Cockle clam shabu-shabu, Lee Soo-geun - Pohang's Gwamegi, Kim Jong-min - Tongyeong's Ppaetegi, Eun Jiwon - Jangheung's Seaweed rice cake, Lee Seung-gi - Inje's Kodari; 2nd theme: Extreme Jobs (Each member has to ride the boat and catch fish/seafood in exchange for their 'free' food they had on the 1st theme); Uhm Tae-woong - Squid, Kim Jong-min - Puffer fish, Lee Soo-geun - Snow crab, Eun Jiwon - Monk fish, Lee Seung-gi - Octopus
107	229–230	372–373	February 5, 2012; February 12, 2012	Seoul	The Beauty of Korea (with Professor Yoo Hong-joon): Gyeongbukgung Palace Tour; Jongmyo Shrine; Korea Furniture Museum Tour; The producers struck a deal with the cast that if they can go to 3 destinations within the day, they wouldn't have to stay overnight, so this was only a 1-day trip.
108	231–232	374–375	February 19, 2012; February 26, 2012	Jeongeup, Jeollabuk-do	Season 1 Finale

== Season 2 ==
=== 2012 ===
List of episodes in 2012 (Episodes 233–275 / Season 2 Episodes 1–43)

Trip #	Episode #	Happy Sunday episode #	Date aired	Place visited	Comments
109	233-234 (S02E01, S02E02)	376-377	4 March 2012; 11 March 2012	Baekado, Incheon	Season 2 Premiere; Returning Cast Members: Lee Soo-geun, Uhm Tae-woong, Kim Jong-min; New Cast Members: Kim Seung-woo, Cha Tae-hyun, Sung Si-kyung, Joo Won; The new cast members were supposed to be dropped off on different islands before getting picked up by the returning cast members on the way to the basecamp at Baekado.; Kim Seung-woo - Deokjeokdo, Cha Tae-hyun - Mungapdo, Sung Si-kyung - Jido, Joo Won - Uldo; Due to weather and logistics issues, only Joo Won ended up going to his island assignment, and was later picked up by the rest of the cast and crew on the way to Baekado.
110	235-236 (S02E03, S02E04)	378-379	18 March 2012; 25 March 2012	Jeongseon, Gangwon-do	Jeongseon Sweeping Tour; Najon Station - Find a coffee vending machine and purchase one cup for each member, Another World Museum - memories quiz, Auraji - bokbulbok baton relay, Arari Village - lunch bokbulbok, Hwaam Cave - no use of English or loanwords during their conversations, "Yeopgi Sunamu" a.k.a. My Sassy Pine Tree (location for the movie My Sassy Girl) - claim the flag before 2:50pm
110	237 (S02E05)	380	1 April 2012	Jeongseon, Gangwon-do	This episode featured highlights and unused footage from the 110th trip in Jeongseon. The broadcast of new episodes was affected by the labor union strikes.
111	238-240 (S02E06, S02E07, S02E08)	381-383	8 April 2012; 15 April 2012; 22 April 2012	Gangjin, Jeollanam-do	"Chunho (Good Spring)" Special: Two teams attempt to catch and take a photo of Kim Jong-min as he introduces 5 tourist attractions in Gangjin and attempt to complete the missions there before 1:00pm: Maryang 5-day Market - Buy 10 things for $10, Chulleong Bridge - Take a photo with a citizen, Black goat farm - Take a photo with a goat, Soybean Paste Village - Take a photo with 500 soybean paste jars, Sauijae - Drink quince, citron, and plum teas and take a photo as evidence; Team 1 (won) - Uhm Tae-woong, Cha Tae-hyun, Joo Won; Team 2 (lost) - Kim Seung-woo, Lee Soo-geun, Sung Si-kyung; Harvesting ark shells; Impromptu village concert with special guest trot singer Kang Jin
112	241-242 (S02E09, S02E10)	386-387	13 May 2012; 20 May 2012	Jeju-do	Nature Adventure Project No. 1 - Dolphin 114; Mission Briefing special guest: Junhyeon; Dolphin-watching on land, sea, and air: Land Team - Kim Seung-woo, Kim Jong-Min; Air Team - Sung Si-kyung; Sea Team #1 - Lee Soo-geun, Joo Won; Sea Team #2 - Uhm Tae-woong, Cha Tae-hyun; Because only Sung Si-kyung was able to see and document dolphins during the main trip, the production team decided to send back one cast member to Jeju every day until one of them sights the dolphins. Cha Tae-hyun was the first to be sent back (trip #113), and he was able to accomplish the mission.
113	243-244 (S02E11, S02E12)	388-389	27 May 2012; 3 June 2012	Inje, Gangwon-do	Entertainer Unity Games; Stop #1 - 10-round Family Feud-style Quiz; Stop #2 - Group jump rope; Stop #3 - Yogurt drink/vinegar bokbulbok, Human Zero game; Stop #4 - River Rafting: Old Boys (won) vs. Young Boys; Basecamp Dinner Games - Cast vs. Crew (won) Foot Volleyball, Cast vs. Crew (won) Tug of War
114	245-246 (S02E13, S02E14)	390-391	10 June 2012; 17 June 2012	Jeonju, Jeollabuk-do	Unplanned Trip - Teams select their own itinerary based on their assigned themes; Food Trip Team - Lee Soo-geun, Joo Won; Experience Team - Cha Tae-hyun, Sung Si-kyung; Walking Team - Kim Seung-woo, Uhm Tae-woong; Island Team - Kim Jong-min
115	247-248 (S02E15, S02E16)	392-393	24 June 2012; 1 July 2012	Sado, Yeosu, South Jeolla Province	Dinosaur Island Trip
116	249-250 (S02E17, S02E18)	394-395	8 July 2012; 15 July 2012	Danyang, Chungcheongbuk-do	Wow-mazing Race; Visiting some of the Eight Views of Danyang; Joo Won attempted to do the paragliding morning mission but was unable to do so due to bad weather
117	251-252 (S02E19, S02E20)	396-397	22 July 2012; 29 July 2012	Jeongdongjin, Gangneung	Summer Vacation Part 1: Straight Road Trip; Special appearance by Cool (South Korean band) and Yoon Bora of Sistar in the first episode; Special appearance by Korean sportscasters, Heo Joon and Han Joon-hee in the second episode; Joo Won did the paragliding mission that he was unable to do during the last trip
118	253-254 (S02E21, S02E22)	398-399	5 August 2012; 8 August 2012	Andong, Gyeongsangbuk-do; Dokdo	Summer Vacation Part 2: We Are Koreans; Each cast member was paired with a Korean who lives abroad; Kim Seung-woo and Lee Ji-hoon from Brazil; Uhm Tae-woong and Park Siu from Bolivia; Lee Soo-geun and Kim Hak-sun from France; Cha Tae-hyun and Lee Jong-myeong from Austria; Kim Jong-min and Golovanov Kirill from Russia; Sung Si-kyung and Li Alexandr from Kazakhstan; Joo Won and Yang Seung-pyeong from United States
119	255-256 (S02E23, S02E24)	400-401	19 August 2012; 26 August 2012	Cheorwon, Gangwon-do	Summer Vacation Part 3: Back to the Basic; Married Team: Lee Soo-geun, Kim Seung-woo, Cha Tae-hyun; Bachelor Team: Uhm Tae-woong, Joo Won, Kim Jong-min, Sung Si-kyung
120	257-258 (S02E25, S02E26)	402-403	2 September 2012; 9 September 2012	Muju, Jeollabuk-do; Jinan Jeollabuk-do; Jangsu, Jeollabuk-do	Body Nurturing Special; King: Sung Si-kyung; Team 1: Lee Soo-geun, Joo Won; Team 2: Kim Seung-woo, Kim Jong-min; Team 3: Uhm Tae-woong, Cha Tae-hyun; The cast members play a 3 short games to decide a King. The remaining casts split into 3 teams and travel to different areas of Mujinjang (Muju, Jinan, Jangsu) to bring back food for the King. The team chosen by the King will eat with him.: Dinner Bokbulbok; Host: Lee Soo-geun; Team Sung: Sung Si-kyung, Uhm Tae-woong, Cha Tae-hyun; Team Kim: Joo Won, Kim Seung-woo, Kim Jong-min
121	259-260 (S02E27, S02E28)	404-405	16 September 2012; 23 September 2012	Bonghwa, Gyeongsangbuk-do	Pavilion Flag War; Good Team: Lee Soo-geun, Joo Won, Kim Jong-min, Sung Si-kyung; Bad/Failed Team: Kim Seung-woo, Uhm Tae-woong, Cha Tae-hyun
122	261-262 (S02E29, S02E30)	406-407	30 September 2012; 7 October 2012	Seocheon, Chungcheongnam-do	2012 Chuseok Special
123	263-264 (S02E31, S02E32)	408-409	14 October 2012; 21 October 2012	Jeongseon, Gangwon-do; Jecheon, North Chungcheong Province	Time capsule: Going back to 6 months they've first been there.; Dinner Bokbulbok; Match Team: Kim Seung-woo, Kim Jong-min; Unmatched Team: Lee Soo-geun, Joo Won, Sung Si-kyung, Uhm Tae-woong, Cha Tae-hyun; Team members are separated into Match and Unmatched team and play games to decide the team that gets to eat dinner.: Game #1: Three Part Couple Race - Duck boat race, Chocolate Stick Game & Squat Walk Race at Uirimji, North Chungcheong Province; Match Team vs. Unmatched Team: Sung Si-kyung, Cha Tae-hyun; Game #2: Action Karaoke at Bakdaljae, North Chungcheong Province; Match Team: Kim Jong-min vs. Unmatched Team: Joo Won; The winners of this round gets the 3 level lunch box whilst the losers get potatoes.: Game #3: Portrait Battle at Gongjeon Station, North Chungcheong Province; Match Team vs. Unmatched Team: Lee Soo-geun, Uhm Tae-woong; Game #4: Treasure Hunt at Cheongpung Cultural Properties, North Chungcheong Province; Match Team vs. Unmatched Team: Joo Won, Cha Tae-hyun
124	265-266 (S02E33, S02E34)	410-411	28 October 2012; 4 November 2012	Gunwi, Gyeongsangbuk-do: Hwabon Village; Hanbam Village	Train of Memories; The members play the Old Catch Phrase quiz to pick the 4 who are sitting and the 3 who will stand for the 4 hour train ride to Gunwi.: Bokbulbok Marathon of Memories; An individual race in Hwabon Village to decide the order that members will get to eat dinner.: Special appearance by Korean sportscaster, Heo Joon; Uhm Tae-woong's wedding announcement [preview]
125	267-268 (S02E35, S02E36)	412-413	11 November 2012; 18 November 2012	Ulju County, Ulsan: Yeongnam Alps	End of Fall Special; Finding the Legacy; Old Boys: Kim Seung-woo, Uhm Tae-woong, Lee Soo-geun, Cha Tae-hyun; Young Boys: Joo Won, Sung Si-kyung, Kim Jong-min; The cast member split into two teams to find the greatest legacy at Yeongnam Alps. The fastest team to complete the three competitions will get the easier 1 hour hiking course, whilst the loser get the harder 2 hours hiking course.: Uhm Tae-woong's wedding announcement
126	269-271 (S02E37, S02E38, S02E39)	414-416	25 November 2012; 2 December 2012; 9 December 2012	Gasado, Jindo County, Jeollanam-do	Island Song Festival; Special guests Korean musicians You Hee-yeol, Yoon Jong-shin, Yoon Sang; Ballad Team: Sung Si-kyung, Uhm Tae-woong; Trot Team: Cha Tae-hyun, Lee Soo-geun, Kim Seung-woo; Dance Team: Kim Jong-min, Joo Won; You Hee-yeol and the Lighthouse Keepers: You Hee-yeol (Keyboard), Yoon Jong-shin (Guitarist), Yoon Sang (Bass), Lee Deok-san (Drummer), Lee Jun (Guitarist)
127	272-273 (S02E40, S02E41)	417-418	16 December 2012; 23 December 2012	Yanggu, Gangwon-do	Healthy Project to Beat the Winter Cold/Jack Frost Special; Go on Leave Game; Members play the 3,6,9 game and the winner gets to go on a 2-hour leave to the mainland.: Jack Frost Team Battle; The teams choose one representative who has to strip each round if their team loses the game.: Manewba (유새총): Lee Soo-geun, Uhm Tae-woong, Kim Jong-min; Matwoba (유둘총): Kim Seung-woo, Joo Won, Cha Tae-hyun; Round 1: 6 questions 6 answers: Members of each team respond to the question with different answers, alternating one person a team at a time.; Round 2: Human Zero: Each team attack the opposing side.; Round 3: Survival rock, paper, scissors; Round 4: Survival Korean rock, paper, scissors; Round 5: Rock, paper, scissors, show one; Fairy and Woodcutter Race; The members have to retrieve their lost clothes.: Yanggu Market: Perform "With You" without any mistakes.; Godaeri Village: Members have to capture the winter scenery that they are assigned to.; Duta Pond: Enjoy the scenery and walk to the observatory where the rest of the clothes are located.
128	274-275 (S02E42, S02E43)	419-420	30 December 2012; 6 January 2013	Muan, Jeollanam-do	Year End Special/New Year Special; Year End Party Race - Individual race with staff members

=== 2013 ===
List of episodes in 2013 (Episodes 276–321 / Season 2 Episodes 44–89)

Trip #	Episode #	Happy Sunday episode #	Date aired	Place visited	Comments
129	276-277 (S02E44, S02E45)	421-422	13 January 2013; 20 January 2013	Taebaek, Gangwon-do	Winter Break Special Part 1: Snow for Snow! A Snowy Trip; 1st Unlucky Snowy Marathon
130	278-279 (S02E46, S02E47)	423-424	27 January 2013; 3 February 2013	Buyeo, Chungcheongnam-do	First episode after Uhm Tae-woong's wedding; Winter Break Special Part 2: History Trip; 2013 Battle of Hwangsanbeol (named after the Battle of Hwangsanbeol
131	280-281 (S02E48, S02E49)	425-426	10 February 2013; 17 February 2013	Samcheok, Gangwon-do	Seollal Special: Durae Town Field Day; Special guests Olympic medalists Korean weightlifter Jang Mi-ran, Korean fencer Choi Byung-chul, Korean Taekwondo practitioner Hwang Kyung-seon
132	282-283 (S02E50, S02E51)	427-428	24 February 2013; 3 March 2013	Suwon, Gyeonggi-do	Theme: It's Dark Under the Lamp; Visited Hwaseong Fortress, a UNESCO World Heritage Site; KBS's 40th Anniversary
133	284-286 (S02E52, S02E53, S02E54)	429-431	10 March 2013; 17 March 2013; 24 March 2013	Sacheon, Gyeonsangnam-do	4,000 Point Race
134	286-287 (S02E54, S02E55)	431-432	24 March 2013; 31 March 2013	Jeju-do	Kim Seung-woo's and Choi Jae-hyung PD's last trip
135	288-289 (S02E56, S02E57)	433-434	7 April 2013; 14 April 2013	Bijindo Island, Tongyeong, Gyeonsangnam-do	Welcome the new member; New cast member Yoo Hae-jin and new PD Lee Se-hui; From this episode the aired date are taken from the date the show aired by KBS World not the original air date by KBS2
136	290-291 (S02E58, S02E59)	435-436	21 April 2013; 28 April 2013	Taean, Chungcheongnam-do	It's Alive!! Taean!!!; Experiencing Taean's land, water and air; Lee Soo-geun and Kim Jong-min went fishing blue crab
137	292-293 (S02E60, S02E61)	437-438	5 May 2013; 12 May 2013	Chuncheon, Gangwon-do	Romance backpacking trip, camping on Sonami Island Boat Boulder, Chuncheon; Actress Choi Kang-hee join the cast for this entire trip; Singer Lee Moon-se bring them food at midnight and join the morning bokbulbok
138	294-295-296 (S02E62, S02E63, S02E64)	439-440-441	19 May 2013; 26 May 2013; 2 June 2013	Busan	Friendship Trip on Busan City Tour; Haeundae jumping ability mission - Taehyun, Jongmin, Joowon; Haemaru stamina mission - Sikyung & Haejin; Gijang market traditional mission - Taewoong & Sugeun; Bokbulbok games for diner with Korea Maritime and Ocean University rugby team; Football with an oval ball; Volleyball by feet; Continue to the next episode for 30 minutes; Kim Jong min won the friendship vote; Bokbulbok games with peoples at Haeundae Beach
139	296-297 (S02E64, S02E65)	441-442	2 June 2013; 9 June 2013	Yeosu, Jeollanam-do	The Compatible Food Race; SNSD Yoona join the members for this entire trip; Special appearance by Huh Young-man; Eel team - Yoona, Taehyun, Sikyung, Joowon; Mustard leaf team - Jongmin, Haejin, Sugeun, Taewoong; Sung Sikyung has to leave early for concert preparation
140	298-299 (S02E66, S02E67)	443-444	16 June 2013; 23 June 2013	Seoul	Bokbulbok Festival; Appearance of 4Minute at the opening; Kim Jongmin left alone to get his back washed by CL 2NE1 but failed then change to Sistar Bora; The members visited Cha taehyun house to cook ramen for lunch
141	300-301 (S02E68, S02E69)	445-446	30 June 2013; 7 July 2013	Binggye, Uiseong, Gyeongsangbuk-do	The Great Spot Special, find the coolest place in South Korea; Cool team - Haejin, Sikyung, Taehyun; Hot team - Taewoong, Sugeun, Joowon, Jongmin; Uhm Taewoong became king for finding the ice
142	302-303 (S02E70, S02E71)	447-448	14 July 2013; 21 July 2013	Imjado, Sinan, Jeollanam-do	Old Boy Scout Summer Camp; Visit Imjanam Elementary School
143	304-305 (S02E72, S02E73)	449-450	28 July 2013; 4 August 2013	Jangheung, Jeollanam-do	The 2013 Vacation Research Center; Actress Soo Ae join the members for this trip
144	306-307 (S02E74, S02E75)	451-452	11 August 2013; 18 August 2013	Gangneung, Gangwon-do	Walking on The Gangneung Bau-gil Trails and record a promotional video; Jumunjin Trail, 12.5 km - Sikyung & Joowon; Ocean and Lake Trail, 16 km - Taehyun & Taewoong; Daegwallyeonggil Old Trail, 14 km - Haejin & Sugeun; Seonjaryeong Wind Trubin Trail, 12 km - Jongmin
145	308-309 (S02E76, S02E77)	453-454	25 August 2013; 1 September 2013	Suncheon, Jeollanam-do	Tropical Night Special; The Bartering Race at Suncheon; Winter team - Haejin & Taehyun; Spring team - Taewoong & Jongmin; Skip team - Sugein, Sikyung, Joowon
146	310-311 (S02E78, S02E79)	455-456	8 September 2013; 15 September 2013	Yangyang, Gangwon-do	Let's Go To Yangyang with Friends, each member should bring 3 friends; Yoo Haejin - Actor Kim Hong-soo, Actor Yoon Jong-goo, Actor Oh Jung-se; Cha Taehyun - Director Kim Young-tak, Actress Kang Ye-won, Actor Shin Seung-hwan; Uhm Taewoong - Actor Jo Jae-yoon, Seong Joo-hoon, Yang Dal-saem; Lee Sugeun - Comedian Kim Min-kyung, Comedian Jang Dong-hyuk, Comedian Han Min-kwan; Kim Jongmin - Comedian Heo Kyung-hwan, Han Joo-hee, Athlete Choi Hong-man; Sung Sikyung - Actor Moon Cheon-sik, Singer-songwriter Shim Hyun-bo, Singer-songwriter Jo Tae-joon; Joowon - Lee Se-wook, Voice Actor Kim Dae-myung, Actor Jung Man-sik
147	312-314 (S02E80, S02E81, S02E82)	457-458-459	22 September 2013; 29 September 2013; 6 October 2013	Daejeon, Daegu and Gwangju	Campus 24 hours, each team went separate ways and only met for opening and scholarship battle at the second day at KAIST; KAIST team - Taehyun & Taewoong; KNU team - Haejin, Sugeun & Joowon; CNU team - Sikyung & Jongmin
148	314-315 (S02E82, S02E83)	459-460	6 October 2013; 13 October 2013	Hongseong, Chungcheongnam-do	Romantic Trip Chasing After Women's Hearts; Kim Min-kyung and Apink came at the first game and made lunch for the members; Child actress Kal So-won came at the third game as literature quiz host; Jongmin and Joowon went fishing shrimp while the other members planned surprise party for them
149	316-317 (S02E84, S02E85)	461-462	20 October 2013; 27 October 2013	Jeju-do	A Grand Day in October; West team - Taehyun, Taewoong, Jongmin; East team - Sugeun & Joowon; Hallasan team - Sikyung, Haejin; Joowon Last episode
150	318-319 (S02E86, S02E87)	463-464	3 November 2013; 10 November 2013	Cheongsong, Gyeongsangbuk-do	Social Status Race; Guest appearance by Gugak singer Song So-hee
151	320-321 (S02E88, S02E89)	465-466	17 November 2013; 24 November 2013	Marado, Goseong	The Final Trip of Season 2; Bring the most northern and the most southern students together

== Season 3 ==
=== 2013 ===
List of episodes in 2013 (Episodes 322–327 / Season 3 Episodes 1–6)

Trip #	Episode #	Happy Sunday episode #	Date aired	Place visited	Comments
152	322-323 (S03E01, S03E02)	467-468	1 December 2013; 8 December 2013	Inje, Gangwon-do	A Brand New Start and Cold Weather Training; Returning Cast Members - Cha Tae-hyun, Kim Jong-min; New Cast Members - Actor Kim Joo-hyuk, Comedian Kim Joon-ho, Singer Defconn, Singer Jung Joon-young; Taehyun and Jongmin went to new members house and woke them up; Maknae PD Yoo Ho-jin from season 1 came back as the main PD; Kim Joon-ho, Kim Joo-hyuk and Defconn sleep outdoor; Suzy came as the first morning angel and cooked breakfast
153	324-325-326 (S03E03, S03E04, S03E05)	469-470-471	15 December 2013; 22 December 2013; 29 December 2013	Seosan, Chungcheongnam-do	Race Before Sunset; Travel to collect items for camping from Seosan to Busan and should be back before sunset; Wonpal team - Taehyun, Defconn, Joonyoung; SUV team - 3G Joohyuk, Junho, Jongmin; 4Minute Hyuna came as morning angel and cooked breakfast
154	326-327 (S03E05, S03E06)	471-472	29 December 2013; 5 January 2014	Gwanghallu Namwon, Jeollabuk-do	Snowy Scene Gift; The team headed to Mokpo Coastal Fery Terminal to go to Bigeumdo Sinan, but all ship can't sail because of high sea warning, they then headed to Namwon

=== 2014 ===
List of episodes in 2014 (Episodes 328–374 / Season 3 Episodes 7–53)

Trip #	Episode #	Happy Sunday episode #	Date aired	Place visited	Comments
155	328-329 (S03E07, S03E08)	473-474	12 January 2014; 19 January 2014	Gyeonggi-do	Relaxing Trip; The production team planned to do a relaxing trip for the members because of the hard trip since the start of season 3, but they changed it because of an ambitious worrywart member, Defconn, said to the PD that they shouldn't made an easy trip and must work harder; Discovery of the 3G team - Joohyuk, Junho and Jongmin, because of the leg cramp; Rain came as morning angel but persuaded to join the game
156	330-331 (S03E09, S03E10)	475-476	26 January 2014; 2 February 2014	Uljin, Gyeongsangbuk-do	The Manly Trip, win the manly-ness games to avoid going into the sea; Jongmin and Junho went on boat to catch octopus
157	332-333 (S03E11, S03E12)	477-478	9 February 2014; 16 February 2014	Seoul	Seollal in Seoul; Special episode Family Arcade show with Heo Cham; Taehyun and Joonyoung visit Yoo In-na radio
158	334-335 (S03E13, S03E14)	479-480	23 February 2014; 2 March 2014	Jeollanam-do	Jeollanamdo Great Food Tour; Special appearance by Kim Saeng-min; Park Shin-hye came as morning angel and ate breakfast with the members
159	336-337-338 (S03E15, S03E16, S03E17)	481-482-483	9 March 2014; 16 March 2014; 23 March 2014	Jeungdo, Sinan, Jeollanam-do	Quit Smoking Project; Hong Kyung-min took part in this project as Taehyun avatar since doesn't smoke, but he will take the punishment if Kyung-min broke the rules
160	338-339-340 (S03E17, S03E18, S03E19)	483-484-485	23 March 2014; 30 March 2014; 6 April 2014	Yangsan, Gyeongsangnam-do	The First Trip of Greeting Spring; Arrive at the platform unnoticed by the citizens; Junho bought snack for passengers in 5 cars at the train; Chicken cooking battle
161	340-341-342 (S03E19, S03E20, S03E21)	485-486-488	6 April 2014; 13 April 2014; 11 May 2014	Hwaseong, Gyeonggi-do	Wild Flowers in Pungdo, a trip without manager, stylist and personal staff; Find wild and rare flowers; Herding wild goats
162	342-343 (S03E21, S03E22)	488-489	11 May 2014; 18 May 2014	Gyeonggi-do and Seoul	Day Tripper Near Seoul; One day trip for one team and could go home around sunset, while the other team had to sleep outdoors and run marathon the next morning; Team we love Joonyoung - Taehyun, Joonyoung, Junho; Team somehow - Joohyuk, Jongmin, Defconn
163	344-345 (S03E23, S03E24)	490-491	25 May 2014; 1 June 2014	Yeongdong Chungcheongbuk-do	Dejavu Trip, a race to the base camp; Hwang Jungmin team - Taehyun, Joohyuk, Joonyoung; Lee Jungjae team - Jongmin, Junho, Defconn; Visit the places visited in Episode 1 of the Season 1; Eun Jiwon came as morning angel and join the morning games
164	346 (S03E25)	492	8 June 2014	Paju Gyeonggi-do	Season 3 Interim Evaluation
165	347-348 (S03E26, S03E27)	493-494	15 June 2014; 22 June 2014	Yeongnam Alps	Backpacking Trip climbing Yeongnam Alps; They can only bring what they could carry in their own backpack; Three course to hike down; 10 minute course, paragliding - Taehyun & Junho but since they didn't have the equipment they went down by car; 30 minute course, by car - Joohyuk & Joonyoung; 2 hours course, walking down
166	349-350 S03E28, S03E29)	495-496	29 June 2014; 6 July 2014	Miryang, Gyeongsangnam-do	Summer Heat Escape Trip; AOA Jimin, Choa and Seolhyun came for the opening in survival blind date game; The first time season 3 members went rebels against the Production team; Joonyoung came last in going home mission
167	351-352 S03E30, S03E31)	497-498	13 July 2014; 20 July 2014	Geojedo Busan	Teacher All Star Special; Each member find a school teacher as described and bring them to Busan; Joohyuk - Lee Minho of Sejong High School, a math teacher, Jeong Ilchae; Junho - Internet Ulzzang of Cheonan Ohseong High School, P.E teacher, Jeong Seunggu; Taehyun - Jung Taeho of Seongdeok High, Korean language teacher, Ko Yeongseok; Defconn - Park Suhong of Anyang Foreign Language High, a geography teacher, Choi Bogeun; Joonyoung - Aspiring comedian of Jingwan Middle School, a Japanese teacher, Ahn Jihun; Jongmin - Crazy dog of Songho High School, historical teacher, Kim Myeongho; Guest appearance by announcer Jeong Da-eun and Sistar
168	353-354 (S03E32, S03E33)	499-500	27 July 2014; 3 August 2014	Donghae Gangwon-do	I Know What You Did Last Summer Vacation; Guest appearance by KBS Entertainment GM Park Taeho, comedian Oh Na-mi and Kim Hye-seon from Gag Concert; 5 vs 1 game, the members vs Joonyoung
169	355-356 (S03E34, S03E35)	501-502	10 August 2014; 17 August 2014	Pocheon Gyeonggi-do	A trip to escape the heat, summer retreat; Delivering ice statue to Pocheon; Coffee milk team - Taehyun & Joonyoung; Cafe latte team - Jongmin & Junho; Juice team - Joohyuk & Defconn
170	357-358 (S03E36, S03E37)	503-504	24 August 2014; 31 August 2014	Gunsan Jeollabuk-do	Unplanned Free Travel; Nature trip team - Taehyun & Junho; Historical and cultural trip team - Joonyoung & Jongmin; Eateries trip team - Joohyuk & Defconn; Made presentation about their trip and sell it; Shin Se-kyung came as morning angel and cooked for them
171	359-360 (S03E38, S03E39)	505-506	7 September 2014; 14 September 2014	Busan	An Untimely Trip; Kim Jun-ho's hidden camera prank; Guest appearance by comedian Park Seong-ho to replace member Kim Jun-ho when he participated at 2nd Busan International Comedy Festival.; Special appearance by Gag Concert The Big World members.
172	361-362-363 (S03E40, S03E41, S03E42)	507-509-510	21 September 2014; 5 October 2014; 12 October 2014	Silmido Incheon	Struggling Note Friend; Bring a friend that struggling and need healing trip; Taehyun - Zo In-sung, Kim Ki-bang; Joohyuk - Kim Jong-do; Jongmin - Kim Je-dong, Chun Myung-hoon; Joonyoung - Roy Kim; Junho - Ryu Jeong-nam; Defconn - Mino; Junho and Jeongnam was left on Silmido
173	364-365-366 (S03E43, S03E44, S03E45)	511-512-513	19 October 2014; 26 October 2014; 2 November 2014	Sindeok Village near Gimje, Jeollabuk-do	Countryside Diary; Each member worked for and spent time a grandmother
174	366-367-368 (S03E45, S03E46, S03E47)	513-514-515	2 November 2014; 9 November 2014; 16 November 2014	Yeongju Gyeongsangbuk-do	Game of Chance Field Trip; Each member returned to their former high schools and recruited 5 students for a field trip; Joohyuk - Youngdong High School; Junho - Chungnam High School; Taehyun - Seocho High School; Defconn - Jeonju Technical High School; Jongmin - Seoul Culture High School; Joonyoung - Rain Shower band from Yangsan High School, since he didn't attend high school in South Korea
175	369-370 (S03E48, S03E49)	516-517	23 November 2014; 30 November 2014	Yeongju Gyeongsangbuk-do	The Best Autumn Meals; Cooking battle and race for the ingredients with star chefs; Sam Kim team - Taehyun, Junho, Defconn; Raymon Kim team - Joohyuk, Jongmin, Joonyoung
176	371-372 (S03E50, S03E51)	518-519	7 December 2014; 14 December 2014	Inje Gangwon-do	First Anniversary Party; Apink came to congratulate them on their first birthday party; The member had to find the destination by them self, which was the basecamp on their first episode, with the production crew filming them in secret from distance; Cold weather training upgraded version; Taehyun's father and Defconn's father came as morning angel
177	373-374 (S03E52, S03E53)	520-521	21 December 2014; 28 December 2014	Jeju-do	End year special in Jeju-do; They were originally planned to go to Marado, but because of bad weather they couldn't sail and had to stay on Jeju-do; The member had to find the logging on their own; 2014 2 Days & 1 Night Awards

=== 2015 ===
List of episodes in 2015 (Episodes 375–424 / Season 3 Episodes 54–103)

Trip #	Episode #	Happy Sunday episode #	Date aired	Place visited	Comments
178	375-376 (S03E54, S03E55)	523-524	11 January 2015; 18 January 2015	Yeosu, Jeollanam-do	Korean Cuisine and Three Meals; They watched the first sunrise of the year at Odongdo Yeosu; Each member went to the sea to catch squid, oyster or ride banana boat
179	377-378-379 (S03E56, S03E57, S03E58)	525-526-527	25 January 2015; 1 February 2015; 8 February 2015	Inje and Goseong, Gangwon-do	New Year Special, experiencing life as a Pollack; A journey to find the missing national fish; Guest appearance by speed skater Kim Dong-sung and announcer Choi Seungdon; Jongmin and Junho went on squid boat for morning mission and then deliver squid to chef Raymon Kim
180	379-380-381 (S03E58, S03E59, S03E60)	527-528-529	8 February 2015; 15 February 2015; 22 February 2015	Icheon, Gyeonggi-do	Exclusive 2 Days and 1 Night; Reporting contest with reporters; Find partners for the trip; Joohyuk with News Anchor Kim Nana; Junho with Reporter Kim Bichira; Taehyun with reporter Lee Jaehui; Jongmin with reporter Kim Dohwan; Joonyoung with reporter Jeong Saebae; Defconn with Reporter Kang Minsu; Special Appearance from Jang Dong-min
181	382-383 (S03E61, S03E62)	530-531	1 March 2015; 8 March 2015	Cheongju, Chungcheongbuk-do	2015 Medical Check up Trip; Doing Endoscopy, testing bad habits for health, Dermatology test, Physical test, Urology test, and Stool test, then rank the members base on their results; Stomach king Cha Tae-hyun, Skin king Jung Joon-young, Physique king Kim Joo-hyuk, Urine king Kim Junho, Feces king Defconn
182	384-385 (S03E63, S03E64)	532-533	15 March 2015; 22 March 2015	Mt.Hambaek, Jeongseon, Gangwon-do	Spring Greeting Special; Climbing Mt.Hambaek summit with Davichi Kang Min-kyung; Taehyun was left alone at Hambaeksan while Minkyung and the other members go back down
183	386-387 (S03E65, S03E66)	534-535	29 March 2015; 5 April 2015	Seoul	National Treasure Trip Around The Nation; Start at Seoul, they play a variation of the Monopoly board game, to visit national treasures around the nation, collecting coins by winning quiz at locations and complete a lap on the board before midnight; Day Trip for the winning team and the looser has to spend the night in a tent in front of Seoul City Hall and do a segment on cultural assets the next morning; Red Team Taehyun, Junho, Jongmin; Blue Team Joohyuk, Joonyoung, Defconn; Special appearance by Joon Park at Jang Dong-min and Lady Jane's radio; Defconn sleeps in the tent and does the morning mission
184	388-389-390 (S03E67, S03E68, S03E69)	536-537-538	12 April 2015; 19 April 2015; 26 April 2015	Daejeon	2nd Chef Special, The Best Juansang; Find the best Makgeolli around the nation and the best food that goes with it; Team Taehyun and Jo Se-ho with unlimited amount of spending money go to Gyeonggi-do; Team Joohyuk and Chef Raymon Kim with $30 go to Jeolla-do; Team Junho and Chef Kang Leo $90 go to Chungcheong-do; Team Defconn and Chef Lee Yeon-bok with $90 go to Gaedo Island; Team Jongmin and Kim Min-jun with $60 go to Gangwon-do; Team Joonyoung and Sam Hammington with $50 go to Jeolla-do; Taehyun and Seho win the celebrities match; Defconn and chef Lee win the chef match
185	391-392-393 (S03E70, S03E71, S03E72)	539-540-541	3 May 2015; 10 May 2015; 17 May 2015	Hodo Island, Boryeong, Chungcheongnam-do	Non-Possession Trip; The member was asked to bring as many things as they want but they can't share each other; They have to throw away half of possession they have every time they fail the missions, and get to keep them when they succeed. They had to spend 2 days with the possession they had left.; Jongmin had to pay for their manager and stylist meals; Appearance by auctioneers Kim Min Seo for dinner bokbulbok game; Taehyun had to sleep on deserted island alone
186	393-394-395 (S03E72, S03E73, S03E74)	541-542-543	17 May 2015; 24 May 2015; 31 May 2015	Seoul	Seoul National University Special; The members became SNU students for 2 days and one night
187	395-396-397 (S03E74, S03E75, S03E76)	543-544-545	31 May 2015; 7 June 2015; 14 June 2015	Yeoncheon, Gyeonggi-do	2 Days & 1 Night Book of Prophecy, the more, more, more, more north trip; Base camp at Center for Unified Future of Korea
188	397-398-399 (S03E76, S03E77, S03E78)	545-546-547	14 June 2015; 21 June 2015; 28 June 2015	Chuncheon, Gangwon-do	A heart-pounding friendship trip with a platonic female friend; Every member brings their female friend whom they think as their friend, instead of a girlfriend for a trip.; Joohyuk with Moon Geun-young; Taehyun with Park Bo-young; Defconn with Girl's Day Minah; Jongmin with Shin Ji; Joonyoung with Lee Jung-hyun; Junho with comedian Kim Sook; Park Bo-young had to leave early on the second day and didn't join them for breakfast
189	400-401-402 (S03E79, S03E80, S03E81)	548-549-550	5 July 2015; 12 July 2015; 19 July 2015	Daejeon; Gongju, Chungcheongnam-do; Jeju-do	2 Nights and 3 Days; To Your Home; Goes to Kim Junho's hometown for lunch (Daejeon); Team Jongmin : Joohyuk, Junho; Team Joonyoung : Taehyun, Defconn; Next, the members visits Kim Jongmin's home at the second episode; Finally, the members arrives at Joon young's home in Jejudo
190	403-404 (S03E82, S03E83)	551-552	26 July 2015; 2 August 2015	Haeundae, Busan; Bal-ri, Ulsan	Summer vacation trip to Korea's Bali; They did opening at Haeundae Beach, Busan and went to Bal-ri to do all summer vacation things that people do in Bali
191	405-406-407 (S03E84, S03E85, S03E86)	553-554-555	9 August 2015; 16 August 2015; 23 August 2015	Seoul	Hot Night Special; Special appearance by Infinite, Beast and Apink who join the napping game for each round; Each member has to take a photo of the night-scape of Seoul, with a high digital camera or a film camera, after participating in a certain mission with the citizens.; Members hold a live radio session next to Hangang with the citizens. Special performance by Jung Eun-ji as guest first with a live song and then by all Apink's members with their new song "Remember".; For the punishment after lose the bokbulbok games, Kim Jun-ho went to Songdo, Incheon and Kim Jong-min went to Mukho, Gangwon-do where they continued to take a photo of the night-scape.
192	407-408-409 (S03E86, S03E87, S03E88)	555-556-557	23 August 2015; 30 August 2015; 6 September 2015	Jeollanam-do	Tasty Food Race Jeollanam-do's 7 Flavors; Members are divided into two teams, Team Joohyuk and Team IDS (Intelligence, Duck, Strength). They must go through missions to eat each of the meals. Whoever eats the most meals wins.; Team Joohyuk: Cha Taehyun, Jung Joonyoung, Kim Joohyuk; Team IDS: Kim Junho, Kim Jongmin, Defconn; Team IDS loses, and are punished by collecting baysalt.
193	410-412 (S03E89, S03E90, S0391)	558-559-560	13 September 2015; 20 September 2015; 27 September 2015	Wonju, Gangwon-do	Men of Autumn Trip; Guest appearance by Choo Sung-hoon to replace Kim Jun-ho, who will be at the Busan International Comedy Festival; Additional guest appearance by Kim Dong-hyun as Kim Joo-hyuk's avatar (Kim Joo-hyuk's foot was injured)
194	412-413-414 (S03E91, S03E92, S03E93)	560-561-563	27 September 2015; 4 October 2015; 18 October 2015	Sangju	We Can See Korea Trip; Members and guests are separated into three teams: Actor Team: Ryohei Otani, Park Joon Hyung, Kim Joohyuk, Cha Taehyun; Singer Team: Henry, Defconn, Jung Joonyoung; Cool Team: John Park, Kim Junho, Kim Jongmin; The teams must race to find treasures in the isolated Hangae village; To eat dinner, the teams must win rounds of folk games.
195	415-416 (S03E94, S03E95)	564-565	25 October 2015; 1 November 2015	Gangwon-do	Movie OST Road; Members are divided into two teams, depending on their acting experience: Actor Team: Kim Junho, Kim Joohyuk, Cha Taehyun; Amateur Team: Kim Jongmin, Defconn, Jung Joonyoung; The teams travel to different locations in Gangwondo that were used to film famous films. They must complete missions against each other to receive OST CDs to exchange for foods for dinner.; The members must reenact famous movie scenes in a relay in 99 seconds to sleep indoors.
196	417-419 (S03E96, S03E97, S03E98)	566-567-568	8 November 2015; 15 November 2015; 22 November 2015	Hongcheon, Gangwon-do	A Cabin Trip in Autumn; Members play games to try to acquire more money for their trip to base camp. They film themselves during the trip.; AOA's Kim Seol-hyun is their morning angel.
197	419 (S03E98)	568	22 November 2015	Haneul Park Archived 2016-01-30 at the Wayback Machine, Sangam-dong, Seoul	Cold Weather Skills Assessment; First trip of November; Members wear special velcro outfits which has six areas that come apart. The person with the most area ripped off will have to sleep outside alone.; Round one: "Good luck in the cold"; Each person turn the wheel and remove the area they pick.; Round two; Each member must face the fan whilst it's blowing and eat a bowl of ramen.; The winner is able to decide one area of clothing that the other members must take off.; Round three; Two members at a time must enter the truck freezer and play one on one alkkagi; The winner gets to come outside and the loser will have to face against the next challenger.; The losing member also has to take two clothing each time they lose.; Morning angel, Kim Sung Shil who has 12 years of saxophone experience
198	420-421 (S03E99, S03E100)	569-570	29 November 2015; 6 December 2015	Goheung, Jeollanam-do	Goodbye Gutaeng Hyung; Kim Joo Hyuk last trip as a member; Lunch game: Goheung Mud Olympics; Round 1: Sled Race; Reach the arena by riding the sled; Round 2: Deep jumpung; Members jump into the mud, the person with the shortest length of their body not immersed in the mud wins.; Round 3: Picking ark clams; "Throw away the citrons"; Members use the citrons they harvested to race to see who can get the most citrons in the bucket. The final two losers will have to make citron tea.; No dinner game, members are treated to a meal in the food truck; Sleep game; Members play "Neh Ma Co" (My Last Ever Elephant Game) and "Neh Mah Ggah (My Last Fish Sauce Game) to decide if they are sleeping indoor or outdoor.; Other member make a short video for Joo Hyuk visiting their previous visited places; Joo Hyuk makes ramen in the morning for staff and members as a farewell treat
199	422-424 (S03E101, S03E102, S03E103)	571-572-573	13 December 2015; 20 December 2015; 27 December 2015	Gyeongju, Gyeongsangbuk-do	Choo Shin Soo Appointment Test; Special guest: Shin-Soo Choo; Original members test intern member, Choo Shin Soo to see if he is suitable for the show; Pressure interview; Original members ask Choo Shin Soo one difficult question each to get to know more about him; Team plays game to decide the mode of transport used to get to their destination. The game involves Shin Shoo throwing the ball from a certain distant and hitting the target.; Lunch game: Gold Crown Relay; Dinner game: Choo Choo Train; Team must form a train line and enter and exit 4 rooms within the time limit; Sleep game: 1 Night 2 Days 20-20 Club; Sleep mission was to see who sleep the deepest. The losing members have to take over 3,000 walking steps at Cheomseongdae; There is a special video of the 2015 KBS Entertainment Award; Jung Joon-young was unable to partake in the award ceremony because of his concert in China; Kim Joo-hyuk came to surprise them during the award ceremony

=== 2016 ===
List of episodes in 2016 (Episodes 425–476 / Season 3 Episodes 104–155)

Trip #	Episode #	Happy Sunday episode #	Date aired	Place visited	Comments
200	425-426-427 (S03E104); S03E105) (S03E106)	574-575-576	3 January 2016; 10 January 2016; 17 January 2016	Hongcheon, Gangwon-do	Family Outing; Special guests: Cha Soo-chan, Cha Tae-eun, Cha Su-jin; Cha Su-jin could not participate in the entire trip because of her young age
201	427-428 (S03E106) (S03E107)	576-577	17 January 2016; 24 January 2016	Pocheon, Gyeonggi-do	Sentimental Winter Camping
202	429-430 (S03E108) (S03E109)	578-579	31 January 2016; 7 February 2016	Pohang, Gyeongsangbuk-do	The Best Trip; Special episode to measure and analyze the real ability of the members; Kim Joo-hyuk narrate this special
203	431-432-433 (S03E110) (S03E111) (S03E112)	580-581-582	14 February 2016; 21 February 2016	Chuncheon, Gangwon-do; Gapyeong, Gyeonggi-do	Special Female Friend Trip; Guest appearance by Park Na-rae, Jang Do-yeon, Lee Guk-joo
204	433-434-435-436 (S03E112) (S03E113) (S03E114) (S03E115)	582-583-584-585	28 February 2016; 6 March 2016; 13 March 2016; 20 March 2016	Harbin, Heilongjiang / Dalian, Liaoning, China	Winter Training Camp Special; 1N2D Season 3 First Trip Abroad; Special History Trip in Harbin; Members learn the history of the great national hero An Jung-geun who assassinated Itō Hirobumi in the hopes of freeing Korea and other nations in the East from Japan's imperialism; Junho arrive late and join them in the morning of the second day because he has Gag Concert recording on the first day
205	437-438 (S03E116) (S03E117)	586-587	27 March 2016; 3 April 2016	Haenam, Jeollanam-do	Spring Executive Retreat; Defconn is Leader, Jongmin is Chairman, Joonyoung is King, Taehyun is Top Dog, Junho is Principal
206	439-440-441 (S03E118) (S03E119) (S03E120)	588-589-590	10 April 2016; 17 April 2016; 24 April 2016	Jeju-do	Spring Field Trip; Guest appearance by Han Hyo-joo
207	442-443-444 (S03E121) (S03E122) (S03E123)	591-592-593	1 May 2016; 8 May 2016; 15 May 2016	Boryeong, Chungcheongnam-do	Spring Travel Weekly Special; Kim Joo-hyuk came to introduce the new member; Yoon Shi-yoon joined as a cast member
208	445-446-447 (S03E124) (S03E125) (S03E126)	594-595-596	22 May 2016; 29 May 2016; 5 June 2016	Mokpo, Jeollanam-do	Cruise to the Island of Mokpo; Team Michael Douglas: Defconn and Taehyun; Team Demi Moore: Jongmin and Joonyoung; Team Tom Cruise: Junho and Shi-yoon; Defconn and Taehyun lose the Coin Casino game and are left behind on Yuldo; Yoo Ho-jin PD's last episode as the main director
209	448-449-450 (S03E127) (S03E128) (S03E129)	597-598-599	12 June 2016; 19 June 2016; 26 June 2016	Seoul	Ewha Womans University Special; Friendly football match with Ewha Sports Soccer Association (ESSA) team. Special appearance by broadcaster Heo Jun, announcer Jo Eun-jeong and former football player Lee Chun-soo as commentators.; Result: 2D1N 3–11 ESSA; ESSA team received the set massage tools as winner gift and ₩1,000,000 for their dinner after scoring more than 7 goals.; 2D1N team didn't need to do the morning mission after scoring 3 goals.; For the dinner bokbulbok, each member should execute a special presentation with subject "The story that I want to talk to you" in front of 500 students who would vote for the better presentation. The winner would receive a campus menu that they have chosen.; Yoo Il-yong PD's first episode as the main director
210	450-451-452 (S03E129) (S03E130) (S03E131)	599-600-601	26 June 2016; 3 July 2016; 10 July 2016	Ulleungdo, Gyeongsangbuk-do	You and I Have to Overcome this Crisis; For the dinner bokbulbok, the members divided into 2 teams to visit around Ulleungdo, do the missions and collect the stickers which they can exchange for Ulleungdo speciality dishes (the faster winning team can take 5 stickers from the other team): Team "Pumpkin Candy": Defconn, Jongmin, Shiyoon; Team "Ohnae Ohnae": Taehyun, Junho, Joonyoung
211	452 (S03E131)	601	10 July 2016	Seoul	Summer's End-of-Semester Ceremony
212	453-454-455 (S03E132) (S03E133) (S03E134)	602-603-604	17 July 2016; 24 July 2016; 31 July 2016	Namwon / Gurye / Suncheon / Gokseong, Jeollabuk-do	Exploring Life in a Summer Vacation
213	455-456-457 (S03E134) (S03E135) (S03E136)	604-605-606	31 July 2016; 7 August 2016; 14 August 2016	Cheongdo, Gyeongsangbuk-do	Heat Brings You Luck; Special appearance by Twice (except Momo) on episode 135, they played a lunch bokbulbok game and left after have lunch with 2D&1N members; For dinner bokbulbok, special appearances by KBS announcers and commentators in game "Oldman Athletics Competition": As game commentators: announcer Lee Ji-yeon, announcer Jo Woo-jong, announcer Han Joon-hee; As game participants (with 2D&1N members): former football player Lee Young-pyo, former artistic gymnast Yeo Hong-chul, badminton player Ha Tae-kwon, fencer Choi Byung-chul
214	457-458-459-460 (S03E136) (S03E137) (S03E138) (S03E139)	606-607-608-609	14 August 2016; 21 August 2016; 28 August 2016; 4 September 2016	Jecheon, Chungcheongbuk-do	Go on an Unplanned Trip; Guest appearances by Park Bo-gum and Kim Jun-hyun; The members and guests divided into 2 teams: Team Taehyun: Jongmin, Defconn, Bogum; Team Junho: Joonyoung, Shiyoon, Junhyun
215	461-462 (S03E140) (S03E141)	610-611	11 September 2016; 18 September 2016	Jeongseon / Taebaek, Gangwon-do	Drama Road; Play the bokbulbok games for lunch, dinner and the morning mission, related to the famous Korean dramas: Descendants of the Sun, Our Sunny Days of Youth, Star in My Heart; Special appearances via telephone voice by Song Hye-kyo and Ahn Jae-wook
216	463-464-465 (S03E142) (S03E143) (S03E144)	612-613-614	25 September 2016; 2 October 2016; 9 October 2016	Seosan, Chungcheongnam-do	Farming Activity for Fall; Three Things You'd Take to a Deserted Island; Jung Joon-young's last appearance before temporary hiatus
217	465-466-467 (S03E144) (S03E145) (S03E146)	614-615-616	9 October 2016; 16 October 2016; 23 October 2016	Yeoju, Gyeonggi-do; Seoul	King Sejong the Great Special
218	467-468-469 (S03E146) (S03E147) (S03E148)	616-617-618	23 October 2016; 30 October 2016; 6 November 2016	Damyang / Hwasun, Jeollanam-do	Kim Joon-ho's Inmates Special; Guest appearances by Yoo Ji-tae and Jung Myung-hoon
219	469-470-471 (S03E148) (S03E149) (S03E150)	618-619-620	6 November 2016; 13 November 2016; 20 November 2016	Gwacheon / Yongin, Gyeonggi-do	School Trip with Friend; Guest appearance by Kim You-jung
220	472-473-474 (S03E151) (S03E152) (S03E153)	621-622-623	27 November 2016; 4 December 2016; 11 December 2016	Namhae, Gyeongsangnam-do; Suncheon, Jeollanam-do	Kim Jong-min's Special; For dinner bokbulbok, the members play a game of "ripping off the name tag" like SBS's Running Man but with 2D&1N's rule, the winners could have a dinner table of Namhae specialties. Jongmin has participated in 180 shows in 17 years of his entertainment career but Running Man is the only show that he never participated since he became the fixed member of 2D&1N.; For sleeping bokbulbok, a blind date between Jongmin with a non-celebrity took place but is controlled by others members via Jongmin's earphone, like MBC's Hot Brothers (another program that he can't participated). If the lady want to meet Jongmin another time after the blind date and come to the meeting place, the members can sleep indoor.; The last part is a hidden camera as a big surprise for Jongmin to celebrate his 9 years with 2D&1N, took place at Sunchon National University with the students, organised by others members and staffs. Special appearances at place by Koyote (Shin Ji and Bbaek Ga), via video by some people who had memories with Jongmin in 2D&1N: Former cast: Kim Joo-hyuk, Eun Jiwon, PD Na Young-seok, Jung Joon-young, Kim Seung-woo; Former guest: Park Bo-gum; Citizens: the grandmothers from Sindeok Village near Gimje, Jeollabuk-do (173rd trip in year 2014), 5 students of Seoul Culture High School (174th trip in year 2014)
221	475-476 (S03E154) (S03E155)	624-625	18 December 2016; 25 December 2016	Muju, Jeollabuk-do	Handsome Men's Winter Camp Special; Guest appearances by Park Seo-joon, Park Hyung-sik (ZE:A) and Minho (SHINee)

=== 2017 ===
List of episodes in 2017 (Episodes 477–518 / Season 3 Episodes 156–197)

Trip #	Episode #	Happy Sunday episode #	Date aired	Place visited	Comments
222	477-478 (S03E156) (S03E157)	626-627	1 January 2017; 8 January 2017	Sokcho / Yangyang / Goseong, Gangwon-do	2017 New Year Special – "Act Your Age"; Special appearance by KBS N Sports's announcer Lee Hyang
223	479-480-481 (S03E158) (S03E159) (S03E160)	628-629-630	15 January 2017; 22 January 2017; 29 January 2017	Geochang / Sancheong, Gyeongsangnam-do	The Sixth Sense Travel; Jung Joon-young's comeback after his hiatus
224	481-482-483 (S03E160) (S03E161) (S03E162)	630-631-632	29 January 2017; 5 February 2017; 12 February 2017	Seoul; Namyangju, Gyeonggi-do; Chuncheon, Gangwon-do	New Year Fashion / I'm Your Guardian; Special appearances by Choi Bool-am, Kim Heung-gook, Lee Kye-in and Kim Joo-hyuk
225	483-484-485 (S03E162) (S03E163) (S03E164)	632-633-634	12 February 2017; 19 February 2017; 26 February 2017	Tongyeong, Gyeongsangnam-do	"I Still Have 12 Ships Left" (With only 12 ships remaining from Admiral Won Gyun's disastrous defeat at the Battle of Chilchonryang, the Korean Joseon kingdom's navy, led by Admiral Yi Sun-sin, destroyed more than 30 ships of the Japanese navy in the Battle of Myeongryang.); The members divided into two teams: Team Jongmin: Joonyoung, Shiyoon; Team Junho: Taehyun, Defconn; Your Way Home; The first member to return home was punished; Special appearance by CNBLUE's Lee Jong-hyun; Cha Tae-hyun lost by returning home first and was punished by being given the task of editing sub-titles for the episode.
226	486-487-488 (S03E165) (S03E166) (S03E167)	635-636-637	5 March 2017; 12 March 2017; 19 March 2017	Buan, Jeollabuk-do	Make 10th Anniversary Theme Song; Guest appearances by UV, Park Na-rae, Roy Kim, Akdong Musician and Kwak Jin-eon
227	489-490 (S03E168) (S03E169)	638-639	26 March 2017; 2 April 2017	Gangnam-gu, Seoul; Paju / Hwaseong, Gyeonggi-do; Gwangju; Mokpo / Muan / Naju, Jeollanam-do; Cheonan / Gongju, Chungcheongnam-do	Hangover Race: National Tour Haejang-guk Road (National Route 1); Special appearance by Choi Soo-jong
228	491-492 (S03E170) (S03E171)	640-641	9 April 2017; 16 April 2017	Hadong, Gyeongsangnam-do	Emotional Trip with the Poets
229	493-494 (S03E172) (S03E173)	642-643	23 April 2017; 30 April 2017	Wando, Jeollanam-do	Remember the Members Pep Rally
230	495-496 (S03E174) (S03E175) (S03E176)	644-645-646	7 May 2017; 14 May 2017; 21 May 2017	Namyang, Gyeongsangnam-do; Namwon, Jeollabuk-do; Gurye, Jeollanam-do	Korea Legacy Guards
231	497-498 (S03E176) (S03E177)	646-647	21 May 2017; 28 May 2017	Incheon; Seoul	Live or Die for Baseball; Special appearance by KBS N Sports's announcer Lee Hyang commentator Jung Min-cheol and Jun Hyun-moo
232	499-500 (S03E178) (S03E179)	648-649	4 June 2017; 11 June 2017	Yeongdeok, Gyeongsangbuk-do	Summer Hot Body Travel; Special appearances by bodybuilder Kim Joon-ho, judoka twin brothers Cho Jun-ho and Cho Jun-hyun, actress cum pilates instructor Yang Jeong-won as the body trainers for six members; All members slept indoors; Cha Tae-hyun went octopus fishing
233	501-502-503 (S03E180) (S03E181) (S03E182)	650-651-652	18 June 2017; 25 June 2017; 2 July 2017	Jejudo / Marado, Jeju-do	Win Popularity Travel
234	503-504-505 (S03E182) (S03E183) (S03E184)	652-653-654	2 July 2017; 9 July 2017; 16 July 2017	Yeongwol, Gangwon-do	Yeongwol Working Holiday
235	506-507 (S03E185) (S03E186)	655-656	23 July 2017; 30 July 2017	Andong / Yeongju / Mungyeong, Gyeongsangbuk-do	Summer Health Food Trip; Special appearances via video by Choi Bool-am, at place by comedians Yoo Min-sang and Moon Se-yoon
236	508 (S03E187)	657	6 August 2017	Suwon / Yeoju, Gyeonggi-do; Goesan, Chungcheongbuk-do	"Watch What You Say" Day Trip
237	509-510-511 (S03E188) (S03E189) (S03E190)	658-659-660	13 August 2017; 20 August 2017; 27 August 2017	Yangyang / Sokcho / Inje / Goseong, Gangwon-do	Last Minute Heat Tour; Special appearance by comedienne Shim Jin-hwa
238	511-512-513 (S03E190) (S03E191) (S03E192)	660-661-662	27 August 2017; 3 September 2017; 10 September 2017	Seoul	Seoul Future Heritage Tour
239	514-515-516 (S03E193) (S03E194) (S03E195)	663-664-665	1 October 2017; 8 October 2017; 15 October 2017	Hongcheon, Gangwon-do	Invincible Youth; Guest appearances by Kim Shin-young, Narsha (Brown Eyed Girls), Goo Hara, Yura (Girl's Day), Kyungri (Nine Muses) and Chaeyeon (DIA)
240	517 (S03E196)	666	22 October 2017		10 Years Special Awards; Viewers' survey result: Best Destination: Baekdusan (Season 1, 22nd trip); Handsome Award: Eun Ji-won – Lee Seung-gi – Yoon Shi-yoon – Jung Joon-young – Kim Joo-hyuk; Like-squid Award: Defconn – Yoo Hae-jin – Kang Ho-dong – Kim Jun-ho – Kim Jong-min; Ignorance King Award: Kim Jong-min – Eun Ji-won – Kim Jun-ho – Lee Soo-geun – Jung Joon-young; Worst Award: Kim Jong-min; Friendship Award: Park Bo-gum – Park Chan-ho – Jo In-sung – Park Seo-joon – Lee Seo-jin; Goddess Award: Han Hyo-joo – Choi Ji-woo – Park Bo-young – Kim Ha-neul – Shin Ji; Most Memorable Public Guests: 3rd Annual Viewers' Tour (Season 1, 98th trip) – Countryside Diary Gimje Grandmothers (Season 3, 173rd trip) – Foreign Workers Special (Season 1, 83rd trip) – Teacher All Star Special (Season 3, 167th trip) – Game of Chance Field Trip (Season 3, 174th trip); Created by members: Golden Teeth Award: Kim Joon-ho; Family Preservation Award: Cha Tae-hyun; Serious/No Fun/Documentary/Hardworking Award: Yoon Shi-yoon; Kim Jong Min's Favorite Award: Jung Joon-young; Hundred-days Party Award: Kim Jong-min; I Want To Kiss/Chastity/Imaginary Love Award: Defconn
241	518 (S03E197)	670	31 December 2017	Seoul; Gimje, Jeollabuk-do	Thank You Special (1st half); Cha Tae-hyun, Kim Joon-ho and Yoon Shi-yoon revisited and played bokbulbok game with few 2D&1N's former guests: Cha Tae-hyun's children, Zo In-sung and Kang Min-kyung (Davichi).; Defconn and Jung Joon-young revisited and gave gifts to the grandmothers in Gimje.; Few former guests appeared on a video message to congrat the 10th year of 2D&1N: Yoo Ji-tae, Eun Ji-won, Park Seo-joon, Kang Min-kyung (Davichi) and Bae Suzy.; Self-study (2nd half): Each member learned about the country where they would arrive and meet 2D&1N's foreign viewers. A small test with few quiz about their knowledge has taken place.; Kazakhstan: Cha Tae-hyun, Kim Jong-min, Jung Joon-young; Cuba: Kim Joon-ho, Defconn, Yoon Shi-yoon

=== 2018 ===
List of episodes in 2018 (Episodes 519–568 / Season 3 Episodes 198–247)

Trip #	Episode #	Happy Sunday episode #	Date aired	Place visited	Comments
242	519-520-521-522 (S03E198) (S03E199) (S03E200) (S03E201)	671-672-673-674	January 7, 2018; January 14, 2018; January 21, 2018; January 28, 2018	Almaty, Kazakhstan; Havana, Cuba	10 Years Special; The members divided into two teams and go abroad to visit 2D&1N's foreign viewers; Kazakhstan team: Cha Tae-hyun, Kim Jong-min, Jung Joon-young; Cuba team: Kim Joon-ho, Defconn, Yoon Shi-yoon; Special appearance by Jung Yong-hwa (CNBLUE) for Cuba team
243	522-523-524 (S03E201) (S03E202) (S03E203)	675-676-677	January 28, 2018; February 4, 2018; February 11, 2018	Seocheon, Chungcheongnam-do	A Little Late New Year Special; Special appearances by Noh Joo-hyun (via phone voice), Choo Mi-ae, Ryu Seung-ryong, Ha Seok-jin, Hyojung (Oh My Girl) and Kal So-won
244	525-526 (S03E204) (S03E205)	678-679	February 25, 2018; March 4, 2018	Inje, Gangwon-do	2018 Inje Winter Wild Camp
245	527-528-529 (S03E206) (S03E207) (S03E208)	680-681-682	March 11, 2018; March 18, 2018; March 25, 2018	Mokpo / Gangjin / Boseong / Suncheon / Gwangyang, Jeollanam-do; Jinju, Gyeongsangnam-do	Three Meals Race (National Route 2)
246	530-531 (S03E209) (S03E210)	683-684	April 1, 2018; April 8, 2018	Wando, Jeollanam-do	Spring Trip to Bogildo Island
247	532-533 (S03E211) (S03E212)	685-686	April 15, 2018; April 22, 2018	Jinhae County / Changwon, Gyeongsangnam-do	Cherry Blossom Tour; Special appearances by Kim Joon-ho's mother and younger sister
248	534-535 (S03E213) (S03E214)	687-688	April 29, 2018; May 6, 2018	Gwangju / Yongin / Pyeongtaek, Gyeonggi-do; Chungju, Chungcheongbuk-do	Master of Events; Guest appearances by Kim Young-chul and Hwang Chi-yeul; Kim Young-chul team: Kim Joon-ho, Defconn, Kim Jong-min; Hwang Chi-yeul team: Cha Tae-hyun, Yoon Shi-yoon, Jung Joon-young; Special appearance by Lee Sang-yong and Hong Jin-young
249	536-537-538 (S03E215) (S03E216) (S03E217)	689-690-691	May 13, 2018; May 20, 2018; May 27, 2018	Pohang, Gyeongsangbuk-do	Becoming Scientists
250	538-539 (S03E217) (S03E218)	691-692	May 27, 2018; June 3, 2018	Boryeong, Chungcheongnam-do	Day Trip to Island
251	539-540-541 (S03E218) (S03E219) (S03E220)	692-693-694	June 3, 2018; June 10, 2018; June 17, 2018	Seoul; Gapyeong, Gyeonggi-do	The Youngest PD, Joonyoung's Tour; Special appearances by Jo Bo-ah and Momoland
252	542-543 (S03E221) (S03E222)	695-696	June 24, 2018; July 1, 2018	Joint Security Area; Daeseong-dong, Paju, Gyeonggi-do	2D1N in Panmunjeom
253	544-545 (S03E223) (S03E224)	697-698	July 8, 2018; July 15, 2018	Yeongwol, Gangwon-do; Hanam, Gyeonggi-do	2018 Land, Sea, and Air Olympics; Special appearance by Go Young-bae (SORAN)
254	546-547-548 (S03E225) (S03E226) (S03E227)	699-700-701	July 22, 2018; July 29, 2018; August 5, 2018	Incheon; Muuido / Silmido	Variety Newborn Special; Joon-ho with Lee Se-jin; Tae-hyun with Lim Ju-hwan; Defconn with Tiger JK; Jong-min with Brian Joo (Fly to the Sky); Shi-yoon with ("Wolverine") Bae Myung-ho; Joon-young with Go Young-bae (SORAN)
255	548-549-550 (S03E227) (S03E228) (S03E229)	701-702-703	August 5, 2018; August 12, 2018; August 19, 2018	Goseong, Gangwon-do	Two Days and One Night versus Shinhwa
256	551-552-553 (S03E230) (S03E231) (S03E232)	704-705-706	September 2, 2018; September 9, 2018; September 16, 2018	Chuncheon, Gangwon-do; Gapyeong, Gyeonggi-do; Boryeong / Asan, Chungcheongnam-do	Global Viewers Tour; Suburban teams: Cha Tae-hyun team: Leyla Bah (French), Sun Xinxuan (Singaporean), Hsu Wei-Ya (Taiwanese); Yoon Shi-yoon team: Aoulad Abdellah Houda (Moroccan), Vlada Korsun 'Lina' (Russian), Rizg Rosmin (Malaysian); Sea teams: Kim Joon-ho team: Muhamad Hardianto (Indonesian), Anisha Parajuli (Nepalese), Zsolt Kovac (Hungarian); Defconn team: Fung Sum Man (Hong Kongese), Chan Kei Ki (Hong Kongese), Kristine Cacho (Filipino); Mountain teams: Kim Jong-min team: Michael Gill (American), Linda Benelhadj (French), Grace Orobosa Amadasun (German); Jung Joon-young team: Cheng Iju (Taiwanese), Mao Junping (Chinese), Kayla Palmar (American); The last episode of this trip marked season 3 as the longest-running season of 2 Days & 1 Night; Special appearance by MC Dingdong as MC for the snack money's bokbulbok
257	554-555 (S03E233) (S03E234)	707-708	September 23, 2018; September 30, 2018	Taebaek, Gangwon-do	Fall Trip to Taebaek
258	556-557 (S03E235) (S03E236)	709-710	October 7, 2018; October 14, 2018	Uiseong / Gunwi, Gyeongsangbuk-do; Paju, Gyeonggi-do	Fall Trip Commercial; Special appearances by Park Ji-hyun and Jung Doo-hong
259	558-559 (S03E237) (S03E238)	711-712	October 21, 2018; October 28, 2018	Muan, Jeollanam-do; Yangsan, Gyeongsangnam-do	The Best Fall Dining; Special appearance by chef Sam Kim; On the second episode of this trip, the dinner was dedicated to Kim Joo-hyuk a year after his death. A photowall was created and featured some of Joo-hyuk's favorite food from the show.; By the morning, they visited Kim Joo-hyuk's grave and paid their respects.; After the main trip, a snippet from Kim Joo-hyuk Memorial Film Festival that was held on October 28, 2018, was shown.
260	560-561 (S03E239) (S03E240)	713-714	November 4, 2018; November 11, 2018	Gongju / Seocheon, Chungcheongnam-do	Enjoying the Fall Colors
261	562-563-564 (S03E241) (S03E242) (S03E243)	715-716-717	November 18, 2018; November 25, 2018; December 2, 2018	Jeonju, Jeollanam-do	The Jeonju Live; Guest appearances by comedian/singer Lee Yong-jin, YouTubers "Hey Jini" and "Oliver Teacher"
262	564-565-566 (S03E243) (S03E244) (S03E245)	717-718-719	December 2, 2018; December 9, 2018; December 16, 2018	Seoul; Paju, Gyeonggi-do	Dream in Your 40s; Special appearances by Hong Kyung-min, Jeong Hyeong-don, Brave Brothers, Samuel, Twice and Nature
263	567-568 (S03E246) (S03E247)	720-721	December 23, 2018; December 30, 2018	Jeju Island	Yellowtail Fish Fishing Race; Guest appearance by comedian/singer Lee Yong-jin; 2018 2 Days & 1 Night Entertainment Awards; Visual Terror Award – Kim Jun-ho; Worst Complainer Award – Defconn; Cost-Effective Award – Jung Joon-young; Precious Award – Yoon Shi-yoon; Friendship Award – Cha Tae-hyun; Daesang – Kim Jun-ho; Yoo Il-yong PD's last episode as the main director

=== 2019 ===
List of episodes in 2019 (Episodes 569–578 / Season 3 Episodes 248–257)

Trip #	Episode #	Happy Sunday episode #	Date aired	Place visited	Comments
264	569-570 (S03E248) (S03E249)	722-723	January 6, 2019; January 13, 2019	Inje, Gangwon-do	2019 Winter Wild Camp; First episode of Kim Seong as the main director; First episode of Lee Yong-jin as an intern member
265	571-572 (S03E250) (S03E251)	724-725	January 20, 2019; January 27, 2019	Pyeongchang / Chuncheon / Hoengseong / Jeongseon/ Wonju, Gangwon-do	Gangwon Noodle Trip; Special appearances as judges by Lee Hye-jeong, Hong Seok-cheon and Lee Wook-jeong PD
266	573-574 (S03E252) (S03E253)	726-727	February 3, 2019; February 10, 2019	Yangpyeong, Gyeonggi-do	Winter Vacation Special with the Cha Siblings; Special appearance by Choi Hyun-woo
267	575-576 (S03E254) (S03E255)	728-729	February 17, 2019; February 24, 2019	Boeun / Okcheon, Chungcheongbuk-do	A Report on Human Greed; Special appearances by Hong Kyung-min, Samuel, Koyote (Shin Ji, Bbaek Ga)
268	577-578 (S03E256) (S03E257)	730-731	March 3, 2019; March 10, 2019	Goheung, Jeollanam-do	Enjoy Goheung on a Time Machine!

== Season 4 ==
=== 2019 ===
List of episodes in 2019 (Episodes 579–582 / Season 4 Episodes 1–4)

Trip #	Episode #	Date aired	Place visited	Comments
269	579-580 (S04E01) (S04E02)	December 8, 2019; December 15, 2019	Danyang, Chungcheongbuk-do	Returning Cast Member: Kim Jong-min; New Cast Members: Actor Yeon Jung-hoon, Comedian Moon Se-yoon, Actor Kim Seon-ho, Rapper DinDin, and Rapper Ravi of VIXX; Bang Geul-yi PD's first episode as main director
270	581-582 (S04E03) (S04E04)	December 22, 2019; December 29, 2019	Inje, Gangwon-do	2019 Cold Weather Academy

=== 2020 ===
List of episodes in 2020 (Episodes 583–633 / Season 4 Episodes 5–55)

Trip #	Episode #	Date aired	Place visited	Comments
271	583-584 (S04E05) (S04E06)	January 5, 2020; January 12, 2020	Taean, Chungcheongnam-do	2020 MT Special
272	585-586 (S04E07) (S04E08)	January 19, 2020; January 26, 2020	Andong, Gyeongsangbuk-do	Protect and Be Lucky
273	587-588 (S04E09) (S04E10)	February 2, 2020; February 9, 2020	Jeongeup / Gochang, Jeollabuk-do	Duplicate Special
274	589-590 (S04E11) (S04E12)	February 16, 2020; February 23, 2020	Wando, Jeollanam-do	Wando Special
275	591-592 (S04E13) (S04E14)	March 1, 2020; March 8, 2020	Pyeongchang, Gangwon-do	Enjoy the Snow Special; Special appearance by Ahn Hyun-mo
276	593-594 (S04E15) (S04E16)	March 15, 2020; March 22, 2020	Incheon	Desert Island Special
277	595-596-597 (S04E17) (S04E18) (S04E19)	March 29, 2020; April 5, 2020; April 12, 2020	Paldal-gu, Suwon, Gyeonggi-do	Go Everywhere All over Korea; Special appearance by announcer Uhm Ji-in
278	598-599-600 (S04E20) (S04E21) (S04E22)	April 19, 2020; April 26, 2020; May 3, 2020		Our Way to School Full of Memories; Special appearance by DinDin's mother as morning angel
279	600-601-602 (S04E22) (S04E23) (S04E24)	May 3, 2020; May 10, 2020; May 17, 2020	Boseong, Jeollanam-do	Zero Stress Tour
280	603-604 (S04E25) (S04E26)	May 24, 2020; May 31, 2020	Jinan, Jeollabuk-do	Family Month Special - We are Brothers
281	605-606 (S04E27) (S04E28)	June 7, 2020; June 14, 2020	Wanju, Jeollabuk-do; Yesan, Chungcheongnam-do; Ansan, Gyeonggi-do; Haenam, Jeollanam-do	Get Off Work Early
282	607-608-609 (S04E29) (S04E30) (S04E31)	June 21, 2020; June 28, 2020; July 5, 2020	Yeongwol, Gangwon-do	Fitness Promotion Project Special; Special appearance by Kim Yeon-ja
283	609-610-611 (S04E31) (S04E32) (S04E33)	July 5, 2020; July 12, 2020; July 19, 2020	Ulleungdo or Dokdo, Gyeongsangbuk-do	Do Whatever You Want; Special appearance by Lee Jang-hee
284	612-613-614 (S04E34) (S04E35) (S04E36)	July 26, 2020; August 2, 2020; August 9, 2020	Seoul	Lack Camp Special
285	614-615 (S04E36) (S04E37)	August 9, 2020; August 16, 2020	Samcheok / Taebaek, Gangwon-do	Camping Special - A Wonderful Vacation; Special appearance by Don Spike
286	616-617-618 (S04E38) (S04E39) (S04E40)	August 23, 2020; August 30, 2020; September 6, 2020	Seoul	Summer Vacation Special; Special appearances by Park Myung-soo, Yoo Min-sang, Jessi, Taemin (Shinee), Kang Daniel, (G)I-dle, Eric Nam, Soyou, DinDin's mother
287	619-620-621 (S04E41) (S04E42) (S04E43)	September 13, 2020; September 20, 2020; September 27, 2020		Three Kingdoms Specialties Special
288	622 (S04E44)	October 4, 2020		Chuseok special
289	622-623 (S04E45) (S04E46)	October 11, 2020; October 18, 2020	Muju, Jeollabuk-do	Bang-topia Special
290	624-625-626 (S04E47) (S04E48) (S04E49)	October 25, 2020; November 1, 2020; November 8, 2020	Hadong / Sancheong, Gyeongsangnam-do	'Know Yourself' Special
291	626-627-628 (S04E49) (S04E50) (S04E51)	November 8, 2020; November 15, 2020; November 22, 2020	Okcheon, Chungcheongbuk-do	Big Fortune Coin Bokbulbok Tour Special
292	629-630 (S04E52) (S04E53)	November 29, 2020; December 6, 2020	Pohang, Gyeongsangbuk-do	Fantastic Cooking King Special
293	631-632-633 (S04E54) (S04E55) (S04E56)	December 13, 2020; December 20, 2020; December 27, 2020	Gyeongju, Gyeongsangbuk-do; Incheon	First Anniversary Project: 'Feel the Rhythm of Korea'

=== 2021 ===
List of episodes in 2021 (Episodes 635–683 / Season 4 Episodes 57–106)

Trip #	Episode #	Date aired	Place visited	Comments
294	635-637 (S04E57) (S04E58) (S04E59)	January 3, 2021; January 10, 2021; January 17, 2021	Hoengseong, Gangwon-do	'Taste of Winter' Special
295	637-638 (S04E59) (S04E60)	January 17, 2021; January 24, 2021	Geoje, Gyeongsangnam-do	'Wish Fulfillment Tour: Everything is Done' Special; Moon Se-yoon is unable to attend the shoot after he was advised by the doctor to rest due to being overworked.
296	639-640 (S04E61) (S04E62)	January 31, 2021; February 7, 2021	Wonju / Pyeongchang, Gangwon-do	Sunday Famous Movie Tour Special
297	641-643 (S04E63) (S04E64) (S04E65)	February 14, 2021; February 21, 2021; February 28, 2021	Nonsan / Gongju, Chungcheongnam-do	Time Traveling Special
298	643-645 (S04E65) (S04E66) (S04E67)	February 28, 2021; March 7, 2021; March 14, 2021	Hwacheon, Gangwon-do	Taste of Nature Special: Wilderness Survival Training
299	646 (S04E68)	March 21, 2021	Incheon	1st Anniversary Special Project
300	647-648 (S04E69) (S04E70)	March 28, 2021; April 4, 2021	Haman, Gyeongsangnam-do	"Pit-a-pat Fluttering Spring" Special
301	649-651 (S04E71) (S04E72) (S04E73)	April 11, 2021; April 18, 2021; April 25, 2021	Hamyang, Gyeongsangnam-do	"Eternal Youth Wild Ginseng Expedition" Special
302	651-653 (S04E73) (S04E74) (S04E75)	April 25, 2021; May 2, 2021; May 9, 2021	Buan, Jeollabuk-do	"This is the Moment" Special
303	654-655 (S04E76) (S04E77)	May 16, 2021; May 23, 2021	Jecheon, Chungcheongbuk-do	A Gentleman's Dignity Special
304	656-657 (S04E78) (S04E79)	May 30, 2021; June 6, 2021	Sokcho / Yangyang / Inje, Gangwon-do	'Impressive Trip' Special
305	658-659 (S04E80) (S04E81)	June 13, 2021; June 20, 2021	Yeosu, Jeollanam-do	'Stay on Island' Special
306	660-662 (S04E82) (S04E83) (S04E84)	June 27, 2021; July 4, 2021; July 11, 2021	Pocheon, Gyeonggi-do	Super Hero Special; Guest appearances by Baek Ji-young, Kim Min-kyung, Mijoo (Lovelyz)
307	663-665 (S04E85) (S04E86) (S04E87)	July 18, 2021; August 8, 2021; August 15, 2021	Gunwi, Gyeongsangbuk-do	"To the Country House" Special; Special appearance by Kim Young-ok
308	665-666 (S04E87) (S04E88)	August 15, 2021; August 22, 2021	Gangneung, Gangwon-do	Ramyeon Heaven Special
309	667-669 (S04E89) (S04E90) (S04E91)	August 29, 2021; September 5, 2021; September 12, 2021	Yeongdeok, Gyeongsangbuk-do	Big Summer Song Party Special
310	669-671 (S04E91) (S04E92) (S04E93)	September 12, 2021; September 19, 2021; September 26, 2021	Chungju, Chungcheongbuk-do	Cultural Heritage: The Heirs Special
311	671-672 (S04E94) (S04E95)	October 3, 2021; October 10, 2021	Cheongsong, Gyeongsangbuk-do	"Day to Go Picnic" Special
312	673-674 (S04E96) (S04E97)	October 17, 2021; October 24, 2021	Gimje, Jeollabuk-do	"The 1st Best Man of Autumn Selection Contest" Special; Episode 673 not aired on KBS World; Kim Seon-ho's parts were edited out starting with Episode 97 after his removal from the show on October 20, 2021.
313	674-676 (S04E97) (S04E98) (S04E99)	October 24, 2021; October 31, 2021; November 7, 2021	Suncheon, Jeollanam-do	"When to Go to Suncheon" Special; Kim Seon-ho's final appearance as cast member
314	676-679 (S04E99) (S04E100) (S04E101) (S04E102)	November 7, 2021; November 14, 2021; November 21, 2021; November 28, 2021	Jeju Island, Jeju-do	Transition to a 5-member cast; 100th episode Special
315	679-681 (S04E102) (S04E103) (S04E104)	November 28, 2021; December 5, 2021; December 12, 2021	Damyang County, Jeollanam-do	"Odd One Out" Special
316	681-683 (S04E104) (S04E105) (S04E106)	December 12, 2021; December 19, 2021; December 26, 2021	Mokpo, Jeollabuk-do	"Taste of Mokpo" Special; Guest appearance by Hyeri

=== 2022 ===
List of episodes in 2022 (Episodes 684–733 / Season 4 Episodes 107–156)

Trip #	Episode #	Date aired	Place visited	Comments
317	684-686 (S04E107) (S04E108) (S04E109)	January 2, 2022; January 9, 2022; January 16, 2022	Chuncheon, Gangwon-do	Recap and Backstage of the 2021 KBS Entertainment Awards; "Romantic, Unplanned Trip" Special
318	686-688 (S04E109) (S04E110) (S04E111)	January 16, 2022; January 23, 2022; January 30, 2022	Hongcheon, Gangwon-do	Winter Fun Olympics Special; Special appearances by KBS commentator Lee Kwang-yong, KBS Variety Show Department Director Cho Hyun-ah and Solar (Mamamoo) on episode 109
No broadcast on February 6 due to the live coverage of the 2022 Winter Olympics.
319	689-691 (S04E112) (S04E113) (S04E114)	February 13, 2022; February 20, 2022; February 27, 2022	Jeongseon, Gangwon-do	Real Winter Training; Actor Na In-woo joins as cast member.
320	691-693 (S04E114) (S04E115) (S04E116)	February 27, 2022; March 6, 2022; March 13, 2022	Geoje / Namhae, Gyeongsangnam-do	"Geoje is warm and filling" Special
321	694-696 (S04E117) (S04E118) (S04E119)	March 20, 2022; March 27, 2022; April 3, 2022	Namwon, Jeollabuk-do	"Generations Old and New" Special
322	696-698 (S04E119) (S04E120) (S04E121)	April 3, 2022; April 10, 2022; April 17, 2022	Gurye, Jeollanam-do	"Isn't it nice in Gurye?" Special; Guest appearance by Han Ga-in; PD Bang Geul-yi is temporarily replaced by PD Han Dong-hyun after the former tested positive for COVID-19.
323	699-700 (S04E122) (S04E123)	April 24, 2022; May 1, 2022	Seosan, Chungcheongnam-do	"Wish Us Luck" Special; Ravi's last trip as a cast member ahead of his mandatory military service; Bang Geul-yi PD's last episode as main director
324	701-702 (S04E124) (S04E125)	May 8, 2022; May 15, 2022	Gongju, Chungcheongnam-do	"Good Son & Bad Son" Race Special; Lee Jeong-gyu PD's first episode as main director; Special appearance by Lee Soon-jae
325	703-704 (S04E126) (S04E127)	May 22, 2022; May 29, 2022	Donghae / Gangneung / Sokcho, Gangwon-do; Ulleung-gun, Gyeongsangbuk-do	Minus One Tour
326	705-707 (S04E128) (S04E129) (S04E130)	June 5, 2022; June 12, 2022; June 19, 2022	Jeju Island	"Way to the Airport" Special (1st half); "Living a Day in Jeju Island" Special (2nd half); Special appearance by Jo Han-sun
327	708-710 (S04E131) (S04E132) (S04E133)	June 26, 2022; July 3, 2022; July 10, 2022	Boeun-gun, Chungcheongbuk-do	"School Trip About Loyalty" Special
328	710-711 (S04E133) (S04E134)	July 10, 2022; July 17, 2022	Pyeongchang, Gangwon-do	"Heat-free Trip" Special
329	712-713 (S04E135) (S04E136)	July 24, 2022; July 31, 2022	Boryeong, Chungcheongnam-do	"Tropical Night" Special & "Now We Smile" Summer Festival; Special appearance by Norazo
330	713-716 (S04E136) (S04E137) (S04E138) (S04E139)	July 31, 2022; August 7, 2022; August 14, 2022; August 21, 2022	Yeongdong, Chungcheongbuk-do	15th Anniversary Special
331	716-718 (S04E139) (S04E140) (S04E141)	August 21, 2022; August 28, 2022; September 4, 2022	Dangjin, Chungcheongnam-do / Hwaseong, Gyeonggi-do	"Alone in Purgatory" Special
332	718-721 (S04E141) (S04E142) (S04E143) (S04E144)	September 4, 2022; September 11, 2022; September 18, 2022; September 25, 2022	Goesan County, Chungcheongbuk-do	"You Go To Hawai'i" Special; Guest appearances by Jo Han-sun, Shin Ji, Lee Si-eon, Jung Seung-hwan and Ki Do-hoon; Special appearance by Yeon Kyu-jin (Yeon Jung-hoon's father) (Ep. 144)
333	721-722 (S04E144) (S04E145)	September 25, 2022; October 2, 2022	Muan County, Hampyeong County, Yeonggwang County, and Naju, Jeollanam-do	"Solitary Gourmet" Special
334	723-725 (S04E146) (S04E147) (S04E148)	October 9, 2022; October 16, 2022; October 23, 2022	Jinju, Gyeongsangnam-do	"Reasoning Trip" Special; Special voice appearance via phone by Shin Dong-yup
335	725-726 (S04E148) (S04E149)	October 23, 2022; November 6, 2022	Hongcheon County & Pyeongchang County, Gangwon-do	"Up and Down Tour" Special
No broadcast on October 30 due to the Seoul Halloween crowd crush.
336	726-728 (S04E149) (S04E150) (S04E151)	November 6, 2022; November 13, 2022; November 20, 2022	Ganghwa Island, Ganghwa County	"New Friends" Special; Guest appearances by Kang Ha-neul and Ha Ji-won
337	728-730 (S04E151) (S04E152) (S04E153)	November 20, 2022; November 27, 2022; December 4, 2022	Busan / Ulsan / Gyeongju / Pohang	2022 Winter Minus One and Super Luxury Trip; 1st Selective Tour: In-woo had to travel to Jeju Island to make 100 Omegi-tteok after losing the first game during breakfast; 2nd Selective Tour: Jong-min had to go to Golgulsa to learn Sunmudo after losing the second game during lunch; 3rd Selective Tour: Jong-min had to travel to Ulleungdo to catch mudfish after losing the third game during dinner; 4th Selective Tour: Se-yoon had to travel to Ulleungdo to enjoy a VIP suite after winning the fourth game to sleep indoor/outdoor and selected DinDin to join him
338	731-733 (S04E154) (S04E155) (S04E156)	December 11, 2022; December 18, 2022; December 25, 2022	Danyang County, Chungcheongbuk-do	"Travel Back in Time" Trip; DinDin is absent due to COVID-19 and his manager, Ryu Chan-song, participated during the broadcast; Actor Yoo Seon-ho joins as cast member
339	733 (S04E156)	December 25, 2022	Gangneung, Gangwon-do	"The Way to Santa Claus's Village" Special; Continues in 2023

=== 2023 ===
List of episodes in 2023 (Episodes 734–784 / Season 4 Episodes 157–207)

Trip #	Episode #	Date aired	Place visited	Comments
339	734-735 (S04E157) (S04E158)	January 1, 2023; January 8, 2023	Gangneung, Gangwon-do	"The Way to Santa Claus's Village" Special; Continued from December 25, 2022
340	735-737 (S04E158) (S04E159) (S04E160)	January 8, 2023; January 15, 2023; January 22, 2023	Yeongwol County, Gangwon-do	"Hoon-Min War" Special
341	737-740 (S04E160) (S04E161) (S04E162) (S04E163)	January 22, 2023; January 29, 2023; February 5, 2023; February 12, 2023	Gochang County, Jeollabuk-do	"Your Age is Equivalent to the Number of Rice Cake Soup Bowls" Special
342	740-742 (S04E163) (S04E164) (S04E165)	February 12, 2023; February 19, 2023; February 26, 2023	Changdeokgung, Seoul	"Protect Our Heritage" Special; Guest appearance by Kim Dae-hee (Ep. 163); Special appearance by Lee Kyu-sup and his sons (Ep. 164)
343	742-744 (S04E165) (S04E166) (S04E167)	February 26, 2023; March 5, 2023; March 12, 2023	Taean County, Chungcheongnam-do	"Minimalist Trip" Special
344	744-746 (S04E167) (S04E168) (S04E169)	March 12, 2023; March 19, 2023; March 26, 2023	Namhae County, Gyeongsangnam-do	"Youth Trip in the Spring of Your Life" Special
345	746-748 (S04E169) (S04E170) (S04E171)	March 26, 2023; April 2, 2023; April 9, 2023	Gwangyang, Jeollanam-do	"Find the Rice Thieves" Special
346	749-751 (S04E172) (S04E173) (S04E174)	April 16, 2023; April 23, 2023; April 30, 2023	Buyeo County, Chungcheongnam-do	"Spring Photography Trip" Special; Special appearance by Seon-ho's dad and students and staff from Oesan Middle School (Ep. 172)
347	751-753 (S04E174) (S04E175) (S04E176)	April 30, 2023; May 7, 2023; May 14, 2023	Samcheok, Gangwon-do	"A Lucky Day" Special; Special voice appearances via phone by Han Ga-in and Lee Won-il (Ep. 175)
348	753-755 (S04E176) (S04E177) (S04E178)	May 14, 2023; May 21, 2023; May 28, 2023	Dangjin, Chungcheongnam-do	"Surviving as a Celebrity's Manager" Special; Special guest appearances by Kim Jong-wook (Se-yoon's manager), Kim Do-hak (In-woo's manager), Kim Si-yeon (Seon-ho's manager), Ryu Chan-song (DinDin's manager), Jung Jae-hwan (Jung-hoon's manager) and Bbaek Ga acting as Kim Jong-min's manager as his real manager was not available.
349	755-757 (S04E178) (S04E179) (S04E180)	May 28, 2023; June 4, 2023; June 11, 2023	Yeongyang County, Gyeongsangbuk-do	"The Ant and the Grasshopper" Special; Special appearances by Kim Do-hak (In-woo's manager), Lee Jae-Seong (show's writer) and Yang Yu-jin as they participated on a blind date won by In-woo's manager in the previous trip. (Ep. 180)
350	758-760 (S04E181) (S04E182) (S04E183)	June 18, 2023; June 25, 2023; July 2, 2023	Chuncheon, Gangwon-do	"Summer Shaved Ice" Special; Special guest appearances by Park Tae-hwan and Cha Jun-hwan
351	761-762 (S04E184) (S04E185)	July 9, 2023; July 23, 2023	Suncheon, Jeollanam-do	"Summer Vacation: Transcending Time and Space" Special
No broadcast on July 16 due to the coverage of the 2023 South Korea floods.
352	763-765 (S04E186) (S04E187) (S04E188)	July 30, 2023; August 6, 2023; August 13, 2023	Seoul (Note: The KBS building was the starting point as the members had to travel around the country)	"Nationwide Deduction Tour" Special; 3 days, 2 nights; Cast members must deduct which city to visit in each province, complete a must-do activity in the correct city and finish the trip on Jeju Island to avoid the penalty of having to film the next trip on a deserted island. The mission was successful.
353	766-768 (S04E189) (S04E190) (S04E191)	August 20, 2023; August 27, 2023; September 3, 2023	Seoul	"Buy a Meal with Cultural Heritage" Special
354	768-769 (S04E191) (S04E192)	September 3, 2023; September 10, 2023	Jeonju, Jeollabuk-do	"How to Eat Well and Sleep Well" Special
355	770-772 (S04E193) (S04E194) (S04E195)	September 17, 2023; September 24, 2023; October 8, 2023	Gwanju, Gyeonggi-do	"Walking Holiday" Chuseok Special; Special appearance by announcer Uhm Ji-in (Ep. 194)
No broadcast on September 30 due to the coverage of the 2022 Asian Games.
356	772-774 (S04E195) (S04E196) (S04E197)	October 8, 2023; October 15, 2023; October 22, 2023	Taebaek, Gangwon-do	"Autumn Fairy Tale" Special; Special appearance by Yoo Jae-pil (Ep. 197)
357	775-776 (S04E198) (S04E199)	October 29, 2023; November 5, 2023	Seocheon County, Chungcheongnam-do	"Searching Mission" Special
358	777-778 (S04E200) (S04E201)	November 12, 2023; November 19, 2023	Yecheon County, Gyeongsangbuk-do	"Fall Foliage Hoodwinker Trip" Special
359	779-781 (S04E202) (S04E203) (S04E204)	November 26, 2023; December 3, 2023; December 10, 2023	Yesan County, Chungcheongnam-do	"Good Older Brother" Special; Special guest appearances by Lee Won-jong, Sleepy, Ahn Jae-hyun, Chun Myung-hoon, Jung Sang-hoon and Kim Dong-hyun
360	782-784 (S04E205) (S04E206) (S04E207)	December 17, 2023; December 24, 2023; December 31, 2023	Episode 205: Seoul / Incheon International Airport; Episodes 206-207: Team A (Jong-min and DinDin) - Uluru, Australia; Team B (Se-yoon and In-woo) - Yeongwol County, Gangwon-do, South Korea; Team C (Jung-hoon and Seon-ho) - Rovaniemi, Finland	"You Worked Hard... So Set Off!" Special; First overseas trip of Season 4; Three teams were formed by the staff and each team had to travel to a different location based on the letter they chose (A, B or C) but were not told where they were going until the end of Episode 205 when they arrived at Incheon International Airport. Before the location was revealed, each team had to complete 3 activities and the winning pair could exchange their letter with another after each activity.; The teams had to complete missions in their respective locations. Team A had to take a helicopter ride and experience outback camping in the wilderness. Team B had to cook 3 meals for themselves and 20 staff members using the ingredients available in their lodging and make kimchi for the winter. Team C had to experience a traditional Finnish sauna and stay up all night to watch the Northern lights.

=== 2024 ===
List of episodes in 2024 (Episodes 785–832 / Season 4 Episodes 208–255)

Trip #	Episode #	Date aired	Place visited	Comments
361	785-786 (S04E208) (S04E209)	January 7, 2024; January 14, 2024	Pyeongchang County, Gangwon-do	"Beat the Cold With Cold in the Winter Olympics" Special at Alpensia Resort; Special appearance by coaches Kim Sik and Shin Mi-ran and bobsledders Suk Young-jin and Kim Ji-min (Ep. 208)
362	787-789 (S04E210) (S04E211) (S04E212)	January 21, 2024; January 28, 2024; February 4, 2024	Cheongju, Chungcheongbuk-do	"Winter Trip in Four Photos" Special; Special appearances by Chuu (Ep. 210) and Na Tae-ju (Ep. 211-212)
363	789-790 (S04E212) (S04E213)	February 4, 2024; February 11, 2024	Mungyeong, Gyeongsangbuk-do	"It Is War If You Fail to Eat Rice Cake Soup", Lunar New Year Special; Special appearances by comedians Jo Su-yeon, Shin Yun-seung and Park Eun-young (Ep. 212); As a go-home mission (Ep. 213), members had to spin a wheel filled with names of people they were all thankful for in 2023 and ended up visiting: Seon-ho's parents (DinDin), Sleepy (In-woo), Hwang Je-sung (Jung-hoon and Se-yoon), Yoo In-soo (Jong-min) and songwriter Beolgu (Seon-ho).
364	791-792 (S04E214) (S04E215)	February 18, 2024; February 25, 2024	Miryang, Gyeongsangnam-do	"Finding Mr. Lee" Special; Special guest appearance by Lee Chan-won
365	793-794 (S04E216) (S04E217)	March 3, 2024; March 10, 2024	Ganghwa Island	"Independent Trip, Only One of Us" Special; As a reward for winning the Grand Award, the production crew decided to let the members plan this trip in its entirety. However, if they did not manage to have enough material to fulfill 2 episodes, the next trip will serve as a punishment. In the end, they barely succeeded in getting enough material for 2 full episodes so they were spared the punishment.
366	795-796 (S04E218) (S04E219)	March 17, 2024; March 24, 2024	Yeosu, Jeollanam-do	"When the Camellia is the Bet" Special
367	797-799 (S04E220) (S04E221) (S04E222)	March 31, 2024; April 7, 2024; April 14, 2024	Goryeong County, Gyeongsangbuk-do	"A Daegaya Trip Where You Clearly Know When You Must Go" Special; Special appearance by auctioneer Park Young-geol (Ep. 221)
368	799-801 (S04E222) (S04E223) (S04E224)	April 14, 2024; April 21, 2024; April 28, 2024	Jincheon County, Chungcheongbuk-do	"Three Kingdoms Unification Race" Special; The opening segment took place at the KBS Building Annex where Music Bank rehearsals were taking place. To determine their lunch menu at the trip's destination, each 1N2D member had to find a specific member of one of six idol groups rehearsing inside the building and take a selfie with that person.; Special appearances (Ep. 222) by: Unis (Seon-ho had to take a selfie with Seowon) Illit (In-woo had to take a selfie with Wonhee) Mark, Renjun and Na Jae-min of NCT Dream (DinDin had to take a selfie with Mark) Juyeon of The Boyz (Se-yoon had to take a selfie with him) Ampers&One (Jong-min had to take a selfie with Kamden) Purple Kiss (Jung-hoon had to take a selfie with Yuki).
369	802-803 (S04E225) (S04E226)	May 5, 2024; May 12, 2024	Hwasun County, Jeollanam-do	"Two Families Under One Roof" Special
370	804-805 (S04E227) (S04E228)	May 19, 2024; May 26, 2024	Hadong County, Gyeongsangnam-do	"Yoo and Kid on the Block" Special; Opening mission: Yoo Seon-ho and DinDin teamed up in order to complete missions while the other 4 members tried to stop them. Seon-ho and DinDin won breakfast while the others had to pick marsh snails.
371	806-807 (S04E229) (S04E230)	June 2, 2024; June 9, 2024	Cheorwon County, Gangwon-do	"Lovely Kung Ye" Special; Special guest appearance by NewJeans (except Hyein) (Ep. 230)
372	808-809 (S04E231) (S04E232)	June 16, 2024; June 23, 2024	Gunsan, Jeollabuk-do	"Train Trip of Abandonment" Special; Opening mission, "Banding Together Leads to Doom": The members depart from Yongsan Station on the West Sea Golden Train to Gunsan. On the way, they played a game to determine which member will be abandoned at a station with only 50,000₩ to arrive in Gunsan on their own. In-woo was left behind at Asan Station and DinDin was left behind at Onyang Oncheon Station. DinDin chose the menu for the remaining members which they received in Janghang Station and had to finish it before Gunsan Station or be left behind. Se-yoon could not finish a 5-layered box meal and had to continue until the final stop at Iksan station and then come back on his own.
373	810-811 (S04E233) (S04E234)	June 30, 2024; July 7, 2024	Yangyang County, (Note: Starting point as they moved to several locations within the area) Gangwon-do	"The Clubs of Scary Aliens and Outsiders Go Training" Special; As part of the previous episode, Jong-min, Seon-ho and Jung-hoon carried out a penalty for losing the final mission and ended up dressed as characters from science-fiction movies and forming the team scary aliens.; Special guest appearances by national athletes and current KBS commentators: Lee Young-pyo, Ki Bo-bae, Jung Ji-hyun, Lee Won-hee, Han Yoo-mi, and Jung You-in.; 1st Mission: Playing in teams, they had to earn more points after three activities (scoring a goal after spinning 15 times, flipping more pages of a book, and gathering flags from several locations. In the end, Team Scary Aliens (Jong-min, Seon-ho, Jung-hoon, Lee Young-pyo, Ki Bo-bae and Jung You-in) lost against Team Outsiders and had to go on a hike on the South Korean section of Mount Kumgang.; Dinner Mission: Playing in teams (Team 1N2D vs. Team Athletes), they had to score more points playing quick rounds of three sports (table tennis, basketball and dodgeball) in order to earn the right for a full-course dinner.; Special guest appearance of Kim Jun-ho as referee (Ep. 234).; In-woo was injured during the Sleep Outdoors vs. Indoors mission and left early to receive medical treatment.
374	812-813 (S04E235) (S04E236)	July 14, 2024; July 21, 2024	Chungju, Chungcheongbuk-do	"No Room for Mercy" Special; PD Lee Jung Kyu last trip as main director. Yeon Jung-hoon last trip as cast member to focus on his acting career. Na In-woo's last trip as cast member to focus on his final acting projects before his military enlistment.
No broadcast on July 28, August 4 and August 11 due to the coverage of the 2024 Summer Olympics.
375	814-815 (S04E237) (S04E238)	August 18, 2024; August 25, 2024	Wanju County, Jeollabuk-do	"2024 Summer Camp" Special; Actor/singer Lee Joon and comedian Jo Se-ho join the cast as members.
376	816-817 (S04E239) (S04E240)	September 1, 2024; September 8, 2024	Ongjin County, Incheon	"Romantic Camping Trip" Special; Jo Se-ho is absent for this trip but recorded several videos as part of the trip's missions for the members.
377	818-819 (S04E241) (S04E242)	September 15, 2024; September 22, 2024	Gapyeong County, Gyeonggi-do	"High Energy Summer Camp" Special; The members were split in two teams (Se-ho, Seon-ho and Jong-min vs. Se-yoon, Lee Joon and DinDin) and performed several missions with activities that are trending among the MZ generation.
378	820-821 (S04E243) (S04E244)	September 29, 2024; October 6, 2024	Hongseong County, Chungcheongnam-do	"Qualifications of a Fall Man" Special; Special appearances by students of Galsan High School (Ep. 243), comedians Jung Tae-ho, Nam Hyun-seung, Kim Si-woo and Chae Hyo-ryeong (Ep. 243-244) and elders and villagers of Sangdam Village, Mount Oseo (Ep. 244).; In Ep. 244, the members were secretly tested on manners as part of the 6 "Qualifications of a Fall Man" where they had to help the show's youngest writer carry two watermelons. Only Moon Se-yoon did it while the others gave excuses for their behavior. The controversy ended up being so big, the production team removed the segment from the show's VOD and YouTube.
379	822-823 (S04E245) (S04E246)	October 13, 2024; October 20, 2024	Gangjin County, Jeollanam-do	"Gourmet Gangjin" Special; Special appearance by Kim Seung-woo (Ep. 246)
380	824-825 (S04E247) (S04E248)	October 27, 2024; November 3, 2024	Yeongwol County & Jeongseon County, Gangwon-do	"Autumn Stamp Fellowship" Special
381	826-827 (S04E249) (S04E250)	November 10, 2024; November 17, 2024	Nonsan, Chungcheongnam-do	"If I Were On Television" Special; Jo Se-ho is absent for these episodes due to his honeymoon.; Special guest appearances by Nam Chang-hee (in place of Se-ho), Bbaek Ga and Enhypen (Ep. 250).
382	828-829 (S04E251) (S04E252)	November 24, 2024; December 1, 2024	Tongyeong, Gyeongsangnam-do	"Yokji Island Blues" Special
383	830-831 (S04E253) (S04E254)	December 8, 2024; December 15, 2024	Gumi & Sangju, Gyeongsangbuk-do	"Genie Grants Wishes" Special; Two members (Se-ho and DinDin) won a special "Wish Card".
384	832 (S04E255)	December 22, 2024	Gapyeong County, Gyeonggi-do	"Happy Holiday Hotel" Special; Under the disguise of a year-end holiday party, the crew tricks the members into the real theme of the trip, "Happy Winter Training Holiday".; Trip continues in 2025.
No broadcast on December 29 due to coverage of the Jeju Air Flight 2216 crash.

=== 2025 ===
List of episodes in 2025 (Episodes 833–884 / Season 4 Episodes 256–307)

Trip #	Episode #	Date aired	Place visited	Comments
384	833-834 (S04E256) (S04E257)	January 5, 2025; January 12, 2025	Gapyeong County, Gyeonggi-do	"Happy Holiday Hotel" Special; Trip continues from 2024. Broadcast of episode 256 was originally scheduled to air on December 29, 2024, but it was postponed one week due to the mourning period after the Jeju Air Flight 2216 crash.
385	834-836 (S04E257) (S04E258) (S04E259)	January 12, 2025; January 19, 2025; January 26, 2025	Paju, Gyeonggi-do	"Run The Calendar Even in 2025" Special; Kim Jong-min announced his marriage during the second half of episode 257. It is scheduled for April 20, 2025.; Special guest appearance by Bbaek Ga (Ep. 258-259).
386	837-838 (S04E260) (S04E261)	February 2, 2025; February 9, 2025	Jinan County, Jeollabuk-do	"Lucky Guys" Special; Special appearance by fortune teller Heo Gu-bong (Ep. 260)
387	839-840 (S04E262) (S04E263)	February 16, 2025; February 23, 2025	Uljin County, Gyeongsangbuk-do	"Fun and Crabby Uljin Sea Race" Special; The trip's penalty was going deep-sea fishing for squid from 1 AM until 5 AM, come back, sleep for a few hours and do the morning mission. So, the members played several games to save themselves from going. Jo Se-ho was injured during one of the games and DinDin (who was already safe) volunteered to replace him. In the end, Kim Jong-min and Lee Joon ended up being selected.
388	841-842 (S04E264) (S04E265)	March 2, 2025; March 9, 2025	Cheongyang County, Chungcheongnam-do & Sunchang County, Jeollabuk-do	"Red Ramen Cooking Competition" Special; Moon Se-yoon, Kim Jong-min and Yoo Seon-ho were in Cheongyang while DinDin, Jo Se-ho and Lee Joon were in Sunchang. Each was told to bring a single ingredient that could help them win but, they had to complete missions to secure those ingredients.; They also obtained chili powder (Cheongyang team) and gochujang (Sunchang team) to highlight the main ingredient of the region they were visiting.; Special appearances via phone by Paik Jong-won, chef Yun Nam-no, Seon-ho's mother, and Bbaek Ga (Ep. 264). Special guest appearances by comedians Choe Sung-min and Lim Woo-il (Eps. 264-265).; Both teams then competed against each other to find the winner. The competition lasted 15 minutes but it was done in relay-style with each team member only allowed to cook for 5 minutes. The cooking competition was a parody of Please Take Care of My Refrigerator.; Special guest judges were food researcher Jeong Jung-hee and food stylist Park Yoon-sun and selected DinDin, Se-ho and Lee Joon's dish as the winner.; The morning mission was set as a bingo card. The members needed to complete a full line by finding a staff that fit the specific requirement of each block and then jump rope 10 times as a group. They started with 24 minutes and the remaining time will be the opening start time for the next trip. The members and staff succeeded with 13 minutes and 16 seconds left, so the next trip will start at 1:16 PM and will only last around 24 hours.
389	843-845 (S04E266) (S04E267) (S04E268)	March 16, 2025; March 23, 2025; March 30, 2025	KBS Hall	"Drifting Around KBS" Special; As a result of the last trip's morning mission, this trip began at 1:16 PM, the latest ever for a trip this season. Filming ended the next day at noon making this the shortest trip in the show's history. All missions and activities were carried inside the KBS building due to the time constraints.; Special appearances by a team of comedians from Gag Concert, announcers Uhm Ji-in, Jung Eun-hye, Hong Ju-yeon, and Kim Jin-woong, and Haha (Note: His faced was covered by a cartoon as he is not allowed to appear on the show due to him being a regular member of SBS's Running Man.) (Ep. 266); To have more airtime, each member was asked to invite a friend to have dinner with. Special guest appearances by Nam Chang-hee, Hanhae, Dex, Kang Han-na, Lim Woo-il, and Shuhua (Ep. 266-268)
390	845-846 (S04E268) (S04E269)	March 30, 2025; April 6, 2025	Yangsan, Gyeongsangnam-do	"Spring in Yangsan" Special; The morning mission decided the next trip. They had to determine location (sea vs. mountain), distance from Seoul (less than 100 kms, between 100 and 200 kms, between 200 and 300 kms, and 300 kms or more), penalty (being abandoned during the trip vs. not), and their meals (fasting vs. feasting). In the end, the next trip was set up at a beach, 300 kilometers or more from Seoul, without anyone being abandoned during the trip, and feasting.
391	847-848 (S04E270) (S04E271)	April 13, 2025; April 20, 2025	Geojedo, Gyeongsangnam-do	"When Life Gives You Age (with 6 Jong-mins)" Special; The trip's concept is centered around Kim Jong-min. Each member must dress as he used to dress at 6 different times in his career, beginning at age 20 when he was Uhm Jung-hwa's backup dancer. The 2 oldest "Jong-mins" (at ages 34 and 38) will suffer a serious penalty. Se-ho and Jong-min were chosen but Jong-min managed to escape with a last-chance game and Se-ho had to hike to watch the sunrise.; As the episode aired on the day Jong-min was getting married, the staff prepared a special pre-wedding surprise. It included a video message with special appearances by Lee Soo-geun, Cha Tae-hyun, Kim Jun-ho, Uhm Jung-hwa, and many citizens who have appeared on the show.
392	849-850 (S04E272) (S04E273)	April 27, 2025; May 4, 2025	Yeoju, Gyeonggi-do	"Let's Show Off Yeoju" Special; The members had 3 vs. 3 matches and the losing team (Se-yoon, Lee Joon and Se-ho) had to face a penalty of being the opening act of the Yeoju Cherry Blossom Festival.; The sleeping indoors or outdoors game was a match between the members and six directors. After tying 3-3, a game of rock-paper-scissors was used as tiebreaker. The 6 directors ended up sleeping outside marking the first time since season 1 that the show's staff has slept outdoors. The members scheduled a revenge match in the summer so all the staff members can end up sleeping outside.
393	851-852 (S04E274) (S04E275)	May 11, 2025; May 18, 2025	Chilgok County, Gyeongsangbuk-do	"Chilgok Ever After" Special; As part of Family Month, the members were invited by a group of elderly women from Utgat Village to spend time with them.
394	853-855 (S04E276) (S04E277) (S04E278)	May 25, 2025; June 1, 2025; June 8, 2025	Yeosu, Jeollanam-do	"Food Boy" Special; The trip's title is a reference to the guest's new series: Good Boy.; Special guest appearances by Park Bo-gum and Lee Sang-yi.
395	855-857 (S04E278) (S04E279) (S04E280)	June 8, 2025; June 15, 2025; June 22, 2025	Ganghwa Island, Incheon	"Our Own Country Vacation" Special
396	857-859 (S04E280) (S04E281) (S04E282)	June 22, 2025; June 29, 2025; July 6, 2025	Boryeong & Buyeo County, Chungcheongnam-do	"Bivouac Race" Special; Kim Jong-min is absent for this trip due to his honeymoon.
397	859-861 (S04E282) (S04E283) (S04E284)	July 6, 2025; July 13, 2025; July 20, 2025	Jeju Island	"Tamra Treasure Expedition" Special; As part of South Korea's "Visit Jeju Heritage Year", the members discovered hidden treasures on Jeju Island.
398	862-863 (S04E285) (S04E286)	July 27, 2025; August 3, 2025	Gangneung, Gangwon-do	"The 1st Defeat Fairy Pageant" Special; As Lee Joon kept losing the missions during the last trip, the crew sets up to find who is the true "defeat" fairy.
399	864-865 (S04E287) (S04E288)	August 10, 2025; August 17, 2025	Yongin, Gyeonggi-do	"Grab and Kill Tour" Special; Trip to celebrate the 1st anniversary of Jo Se-ho and Lee Joon joining the show. They each planned all the activities based on their bucket lists.
400	866-868 (S04E289) (S04E290) (S04E291)	August 24, 2025; August 31, 2025; September 7, 2025	Donghae, Gangwon-do	"Welcome to the Real Variety Show" Special; Special guest appearance by Day6
401	868-869 (S04E291) (S04E292)	September 7, 2025; September 14, 2025	Namyangju, Gyeonggi-do	"Home Sweet Home" Special; Members got the opportunity to go home on the same day. DinDin, Lee Joon, Se-yoon, and Se-ho ended up winning. Seon-ho and Jong-min had to spend the night at the KBS building and slept in the show's editing room.
402	870-871 (S04E293) (S04E294)	September 21, 2025; September 28, 2025	Uiryeong County, Gyeongsangnam-do	"War of Money" Special
403	872-874 (S04E295) (S04E296) (S04E297)	October 5, 2025; October 12, 2025; October 19, 2025	Seoul metropolitan area	"One Night Ribbon Trip" Special; Members were intercepted by the staff before they arrived to the KBS Building. Moon Se-yoon and DinDin received special missions to drive around, pick up 2 more members and get to Yeouido Han River Park as soon as possible while the remaining members were only allowed to walk. There was no prize for arriving first as the mission was only planned for them to form teams. The trip had them explore several areas of Seoul Metropolitan City.
404	874-876 (S04E297) (S04E298) (S04E299)	October 19, 2025; October 26, 2025; November 2, 2025	Ulleungdo, Gyeongsangbuk-do	"My Ulleung Island Notes" Special; Two members (Moon Se-yoon and Lee Joon) were chosen to do the opening the day before the rest of the members showed up to the location. They took a night cruise from Pohang to Ulleung Island and won money after playing games against the show's producers. The rest arrived on a shorter cruise the following morning.; Special guest appearance by Professor Seo Kyoung-Duk (Ep. 298-299) who took the members to Liancourt Rocks.
405	877-878 (S04E300) (S04E301)	November 9, 2025; November 16, 2025	Danyang County & Jecheon, Chungcheongbuk-do	"In This Autumn Moment" Special; This marks the 300th episode of Season 4.
406	879-880 (S04E302) (S04E303)	November 23, 2025; November 30, 2025	Goheung County, Jeollanam-do	"Hungry Lupin" Special
407	881-882 (S04E304) (S04E305)	December 7, 2025; December 14, 2025	Andong, Gyeongsangbuk-do	"Nobleman and Farmhand" Special
408	883-884 (S04E306) (S04E307)	December 21, 2025; December 28, 2025	Sacheon, Gyeongsangnam-do	"Year-End Hardship Settlement Race" Special; Jo Se-ho's final trip as he resigned from the show due to recent controversies.

=== 2026 ===
List of episodes in 2026 (Episodes 885–present / Season 4 Episodes 308–present)

Trip #	Episode #	Date aired	Place visited	Comments
409	885-886 (S04E308) (S04E309)	January 4, 2026; January 11, 2026	Chuncheon, Gangwon-do	"New Year's Plan Manipulation Squad" Special
410	887-889 (S04E310) (S04E311) (S04E312)	January 18, 2026; January 25, 2026; February 1, 2026	Inje County & Pyeongchang County, Gangwon-do	"Winter Workshop" Special; Special guest appearances by Boom & Kim Jae-won; The staff tricked the members as the real concept of the trip, "Real Winter Training", was revealed when the group was traveling to the base camp. It was the first time that it was done with guests and it was recorded in -17°C (1°F) weather, the coldest taping of the show. Lee Joon won the indoors-outdoors game and was the only one allowed to sleep inside a house.
411	889-890 (S04E312) (S04E313)	February 1, 2026; February 8, 2026	Gunsan, Jeollabuk-do	"Gunsan Islands Race" Special
412	891-892 (S04E314) (S04E315)	February 15, 2026; February 22, 2026	Pohang, Gyeongsangbuk-do	"Brotherly Trip" Special
413	893-894 (S04E316) (S04E317)	March 1, 2026; March 8, 2026	Wolmido, Incheon	"Lying on the Incheon Seashore" Special; Special appearance by the Ssireum team from Bupyeong High School (Ep. 316); Special guest appearance by DinDin's mother (Ep. 317)
414	895-896 (S04E318) (S04E319)	March 15, 2026; March 22, 2026	Cheongdo County, Gyeongsangbuk-do	"Back to the 90s: Time Capsule Race" Special
415	897-898 (S04E320) (S04E321)	March 29, 2026; April 5, 2026	Mokpo, Jeollanam-do	"Spring Meal Battle: Flavor vs. Flavor" Special; Special guest appearances by chefs Jung Ho-young & Sam Kim; The chefs competed in a battle with seasonal ingredients from Mokpo with help from the members. DinDin, Lee Joon, Seon-ho and chef Jung were one team and Se-yoon, Jong-min and chef Sam Kim were the other. They had to prepare 2 dishes (both chefs did 3) in 50 minutes in a relay style cooking battle. They were judged by 11 staff members and Team Sam Kim won 7-4.
416	899-900 (S04E322) (S04E323)	April 12, 2026; April 19, 2026	Dangjin, Chungcheongnam-do	"Dangjin Tour of Passion" Special; Yoo Seon-ho was absent for this trip due to an injury while rehearsing for a musical.; Special guest appearances by Yunho & Kang Jae-jun (replacing Seon-ho)
417	901-902 (S04E324) (S04E325)	April 26, 2026; May 3, 2026	Naju, Jeollanam-do	"Naju Trip Where Fun Is Multiplied" Special; Special appearance by students from Naju Jungang Elementary School (Ep. 324)
418	903-904 (S04E326) (S04E327)	May 10, 2026; May 17, 2026	Yanggu County, Gangwon-do	"War of Idiots: Odd Man Out vs. Average Idiots" Special; As DinDin has won several games against the rest of the members, all join forces trying to beat him. By solving missions, they must reach a specific location before he does in order to win a special lunch. In the end, DinDin won the race and earned lunch.; Special guest appearance by Illit (except Moka) as the morning fairies (Ep. 327)
419	905-906 (S04E328) (S04E329)	May 24, 2026; May 31, 2026	Namhae County, Gyeongsangnam-do	"Working Holiday in Namhae" Special; Yoo Seon-ho's final trip as he will focus on his acting career.
420	907-908 (S04E330) (S04E331)	June 7, 2026; June 14, 2026	Jeongseon County, Gangwon-do	"Self-Sufficient Wilderness Tour" Special; Actor/model Lee Ki-taek and comedian Lee Yong-jin join the cast as new members.
421	909-910 (S04E332) (S04E333)	June 21, 2026; June 28, 2026	Wando County, Jeollanam-do	"Desert Island Check-In" Special; After arriving in Wando County, the members were transported by boat to Daehwa Island, a now deserted island, to play a game, with the loser (Yong-jin) having to stay there. The rest toured Geumdang Island before another member (Se-yoon) was chosen to join Yong-jin after losing a game, followed by Jong-min. They had a chance to swap islands through a rugby game in the mudflats in the following episode.
422	911-912 (S04E334) (S04E335)	July 5, 2026; July 12, 2026	National Route 7	"Route 7 Healing Trip" Special; Third national Route trip following the Route 1 and Route 2 trips done in Season 3.
423	913-914 (S04E336) (S04E337)	July 19, 2026; July 26, 2026	Asan, Chungcheongnam-do	"2026 Summer Workshop" Special
424	915-916 (S04E338) (S04E339)	August 2, 2026; August 9, 2026	Chuncheon, Gangwon-do & Gapyeong County, Gyeonggi-do	"Holiday Abroad Next Door" Special
425	917-918 (S04E340) (S04E341)	August 16, 2026; August 30, 2026	Geoje, Gyeongsangnam-do	"Geoje Treasure Hunt" Special
No broadcast on August 23 out of respect after heavy rainfall and flooding in the Geoje area.
426	919-920 (S04E342) (S04E343)	September 6, 2026; September 13, 2026	Taebaek, Gangwon-do	"Stamina Boosting Tour" Special
No broadcast on September 20 and September 27 due to coverage of the 2026 Asian Games.
427	921-922 (S04E344) (S04E345)	October 4, 2026; October 11, 2026	Gangjin County, Haenam County & Yeongam County, Jeonnam-Gwangju	"Gang-Hae-Yeong" Special later turned into the "Accidental Independent Travel" Special; The crew set up a trip through the region for the members to experience plenty of outdoor activities. However, torrential rain at the time of filming cancelled the original plans and the crew had to improvise a free-form trip instead.; Se-yoon negotiated more money for the members' lunch in exchange for a box of peaches. The crew agreed and gave him the money upfront, only to discover, some hours later, that Se-yoon's manager had removed the peaches from the car the day before. As a result, the producer decided not to punish Se-yoon on this trip but to wait until the next one to determine the consequences. The incident was labeled as "Peach-gate".
428	923-924 (S04E346) (S04E347)	October 18, 2026; October 25, 2026	Seosan, Chungcheongnam-do	"Fine Payoff Race" Special; A hearing was held at the beginning of this trip to determine how to punish the members for last's trip "Peach-gate". Se-yoon got 10 fine tickets, Jong-min, Yong-jin, and Ki-taek received 5 fine tickets each, while Lee Joon and DinDin received 3 fine tickets each. They had to clear the fine tickets before reaching the base camp in Seosan.
429	925-926 (S04E348) (S04E349)	November 1, 2026; November 8, 2026	Yeosu, Jeonnam-Gwangju	"Unite To Survive" Special
430	927-928 (S04E350) (S04E351)	November 15, 2026; November 22, 2026	Gongju, Chungcheongnam-do	"Men Who Want To Be King" Special

== Ratings ==
In the ratings below, the highest rating for the show will be in red, and the lowest rating for the show will be in blue each season.

=== Season 1 ===
List of ratings (Episodes 1–232)

Note: Ratings not found will be represented by "—".

Episode #	Original Airdate	AGB Ratings	
Episode #	Original Airdate	Nationwide	Seoul National Capital Area
1-14	August 5, 2007 to November 4, 2007	—	—
15	November 11	14.3%	14.3%
16	November 18	18.9%	18.8%
17	November 25	16.1%	15.9%
18	December 2	17.4%	17.7%
19	December 9	17.7%	17.5%
20	December 16	17.4%	17.9%
21	December 23	18.4%	18.6%
22	December 30, 2007	18.5%	18.9%
23	January 6, 2008	18.6%	19.1%
24	January 13	19.0%	19.7%
25	January 20	21.2%	21.2%
26	January 27	19.2%	19.6%
27	February 3	20.1%	19.9%
28	February 10	19.5%	20.0%
29	February 17	17.4%	17.5%
30	February 24	18.5%	18.5%
31	March 2	19.6%	19.9%
32	March 9	17.0%	16.9%
33	March 16	17.0%	16.3%
34	March 23	17.8%	18.6%
35	March 30	18.3%	18.5%
36	April 6	17.8%	18.3%
37	April 13	17.2%	17.4%
38	April 20	15.9%	16.4%
39	April 27	17.4%	17.5%
40	May 4	15.2%	15.4%
41	May 11	15.1%	15.2%
42	May 18	17.3%	18.4%
43	May 25	17.5%	18.0%
44	June 1	16.4%	17.4%
45	June 8	18.2%	19.4%
46	June 15	20.3%	—
47	June 22	18.2%	—
48	June 29	18.2%	—
49	July 6,	19.1%	20.0%
50	July 13	20.1%	20.6%
51	July 20	19.7%	—
52	July 27	15.6%	—
53	August 3	14.1%	—
54	August 10	14.3%	14.2%
55	August 17	17.7%	17.8%
56	August 24	15.6%	15.4%
57	August 31	15.8%	16.1%
58	September 7	18.3%	18.5%
59	September 14	8.5%	8.3%
60	September 21	14.9%	14.7%
61	September 28	13.4%	13.1%
62	October 5	11.3%	10.9%
63	October 12	11.2%	10.9%
64	October 19	12.7%	12.6%
65	October 26	12.4%	12.4%
66	November 2	11.8%	11.3%
67	November 9	14.2%	14.0%
68	November 16	14.7%	15.3%
69	November 23	14.3%	13.9%
70	November 30	16.0%	15.6%
71	December 7	17.0%	17.4%
72	December 14	18.1%	18.1%
73	December 21	17.5%	17.3%
74	December 28, 2008	21.9%	21.4%
75	January 4, 2009	20.7%	20.3%
76	January 11	20.2%	20.2%
77	January 18	19.6%	19.3%
78	January 25	14.1%	13.7%
79	February 1	20.5%	20.2%
80	February 8	18.6%	19.3%
81	February 15	18.8%	19.2%
82	February 22	20.8%	20.5%
83	March 1	17.2%	17.7%
84	March 8	18.7%	19.3%
85	March 15	18.3%	18.4%
86	March 22	17.7%	17.8%
87	March 29	16.0%	15.6%
88	April 5	17.2%	16.8%
89	April 12	16.8%	17.0%
90	April 19	19.5%	19.6%
91	April 26	18.7%	17.9%
92	May 3	15.4%	14.7%
93	May 10	17.2%	17.1%
94	May 17	17.2%	17.7%
95	May 31	17.7%	18.1%
96	June 7	18.3%	18.2%
97	June 14	18.6%	18.2%
98	June 21	20.1%	20.2%
99	June 28	21.5%	22.4%
100	July 5	19.4%	19.5%
101	July 12	23.0%	22.5%
102	July 19	21.2%	21.0%
103	July 26	22.7%	22.7%
104	August 2	16.9%	15.5%
105	August 9	19.7%	19.8%
106	August 16	21.4%	21.6%
107	August 31	20.7%	20.1%
108	September 6	20.5%	20.3%
109	September 13	22.4%	22.3%
110	September 20	23.0%	23.0%
111	September 27	26.4%	26.5%
112	October 4	22.3%	21.9%
113	October 11	23.3%	23.6%
114	October 18	23.7%	23.4%
115	October 25	22.9%	22.7%
116	November 1	26.4%	26.4%
117	November 8	26.1%	25.8%
118	November 15	26.3%	26.4%
119	November 22	24.7%	25.1%
120	November 29	24.4%	24.0%
121	December 6	23.9%	23.5%
122	December 13	24.9%	25.0%
123	December 20	27.2%	27.0%

Episode #	Original Airdate	AGB Ratings	
Episode #	Original Airdate	Nationwide	Seoul National Capital Area
124	December 27, 2009	27.6%	26.8%
125	January 3, 2010	29.0%	28.7%
126	January 10	29.6%	29.7%
127	January 17	26.6%	25.8%
128	January 24	29.6%	29.4%
129	January 31	26.7%	26.6%
130	February 7	26.0%	26.2%
131	February 14	18.9%	18.2%
132	February 21	27.1%	27.2%
133	February 28	25.7%	26.1%
134	March 7	32.3%	32.6%
135	March 14	27.4%	27.8%
136	March 21	27.6%	27.6%
137	March 28	26.7%	27.0%
138	April 11	28.8%	29.2%
139	May 2	23.3%	24.0%
140	May 9	24.8%	25.3%
141	May 16	18.1%	19.2%
142	May 23	26.8%	26.8%
143	May 30	20.5%	20.9%
144	June 6	25.4%	25.9%
145	June 13	21.5%	24.3%
146	June 20	17.5%	20.1%
147	June 27	21.2%	21.5%
148	July 11	21.3%	20.3%
149	July 18	22.5%	23.3%
150	July 25	23.9%	23.5%
151	August 1	22.0%	23.0%
152	August 8	21.7%	22.0%
153	August 15	24.9%	24.8%
154	August 22	23.6%	24.3%
155	August 29	26.0%	26.8%
156	September 5	27.3%	28.6%
157	September 12	25.1%	25.6%
158	September 19	27.5%	28.7%
159	September 26	31.4%	32.7%
160	October 3	23.5%	24.3%
161	October 10	21.5%	22.0%
162	October 17	21.9%	22.8%
163	October 24	28.6%	28.3%
164	October 31	22.5%	22.7%
165	November 7	22.5%	24.1%
166	November 14	26.8%	27.4%
167	November 21	23.5%	23.7%
168	November 28	25.2%	25.9%
169	December 5	24.7%	24.5%
170	December 12	25.2%	25.0%
171	December 19	25.9%	26.4%
172	December 26, 2010	26.6%	26.3%
173	January 2, 2011	21.7%	25.2%
174	January 9	21.7%	25.2%
175	January 16	23.5%	—
176	January 23	25.0%	26.6%
177	January 30	23.4%	27.9%
178	February 6	21.5%	25.3%
179	February 13	22.0%	26.1%
180	February 20	19.6%	21.3%
181	February 27	19.3%	22.2%
182	March 6	20.4%	22.6%
183	March 13	18.6%	20.8%
184	March 20	19.5%	21.0%
185	March 27	17.3%	18.6%
186	April 3	20.0%	21.7%
187	April 10	18.9%	20.9%
188	April 17	19.1%	21.4%
189	April 24	21.1%	23.4%
190	May 1	—	—
191	May 8	14.6%	15.6%
192	May 15	18.4%	20.0%
193	May 22	—	—
194	May 29	17.7%	19.8%
195	June 5	16.6%	17.5%
196	June 12	17.4%	19.7%
197	June 19	19.1%	20.3%
198	June 36	21.7%	22.3%
199	July 3	17.9%	19.1%
200	July 10	19.0%	20.8%
201	July 17	19.1%	21.0%
202	July 31	18.3%	20.8%
203	August 7	19.5%	20.9%
204	August 14	15.0%	16.8%
205	August 21	14.7%	15.6%
206	August 28	17.5%	19.6%
207	September 4	18.0%	20.1%
208	September 11	16.0%	16.9%
209	September 18	19.3%	21.0%
210	September 25	16.7%	18.1%
211	October 2	16.8%	18.3%
212	October 9	18.4%	19.6%
213	October 16	19.4%	21.1%
214	October 23	16.3%	17.2%
215	October 30	16.1%	17.2%
216	November 6	18.2%	19.4%
217	November 13	19.5%	19.1%
218	November 20	18.4%	19.1%
219	November 27	17.3%	17.7%
220	December 4	19.1%	21.0%
221	December 11	18.0%	18.8%
222	December 18	19.7%	21.1%
223	December 25, 2011	19.7%	20.7%
224	January 1, 2012	19.4%	19.7%
225	January 8	20.0%	21.4%
226	January 15	20.4%	21.5%
227	January 22	11.9%	12.3%
228	January 29	16.9%	17.0%
229	February 5	17.5%	18.5%
230	February 12	19.7%	22.3%
231	February 19	18.9%	20.3%
232 (last episode)	February 26, 2012	18.3%	19.3%

=== Season 2 ===
List of ratings (Episodes 233–321 / Season 2 Episodes 1–89)

Note: For the TNmS ratings, boxes marked with "—" means the episode did not make it into the Top 20, and therefore ratings were not found.

Episode #	Original Airdate	TNmS Ratings (Nationwide)	AGB Ratings (Nationwide)
1 (first episode)	March 4, 2012	19.2%	19.8%
2	March 11	19.6%	20.0%
3	March 18	18.2%	19.1%
4	March 25	18.2%	18.6%
5	April 1	13.0%	12.0%
6	April 8	15.9%	15.8%
7	April 15	15.0%	14.1%
8	April 22	15.2%	15.3%
9	May 13	9.8%	10.3%
10	May 20	9.1%	9.3%
11	May 27	8.4%	9.0%
12	June 3	9.1%	10.0%
13	June 10	11.3%	11.9%
14	June 17	10.6%	10.6%
15	June 24	11.4%	11.8%
16	July 1	11.9%	10.4%
17	July 8	10.6%	13.1%
18	July 15	14.3%	17.4%
19	July 22	12.9%	14.8%
20	July 29	11.9%	18.5%
21	August 5	12.7%	13.6%
22	August 12	15.8%	15.3%
23	August 19	14.7%	18.7%
24	August 26	16.2%	19.6%
25	September 2	13.6%	16.4%
26	September 9	16.0%	19.2%
27	September 16	15.7%	17.9%
28	September 23	13.4%	16.7%
29	September 30	10.2%	13.1%
30	October 7	13.4%	18.1%
31	October 14	14.6%	16.8%
32	October 21	14.2%	18.9%
33	October 28	16.4%	19.6%
34	November 4	15.5%	20.8%
35	November 11	15.1%	20.2%
36	November 18	14.0%	16.7%
37	November 25	16.9%	19.9%
38	December 2	16.5%	20.8%
39	December 9	16.6%	17.6%
40	December 16	15.4%	17.9%
41	December 23	16.9%	20.9%
42	December 30, 2012	16.5%	19.8%
43	January 6, 2013	17.5%	19.9%
44	January 13	16.1%	19.3%
45	January 20	14.5%	20.7%

Episode #	Original Airdate	TNmS Ratings (Nationwide)	AGB Ratings (Nationwide)
46	January 27	13.2%	18.0%
47	February 3	13.3%	18.6%
48	February 10	11.6%	15.0%
49	February 17	13.3%	17.1%
50	February 24	12.9%	17.9%
51	March 3	11.5%	15.6%
52	March 10	10.9%	14.0%
53	March 17	11.0%	16.1%
54	March 24	10.6%	15.7%
55	March 31	9.2%	13.4%
56	April 7	10.4%	18.0%
57	April 14	—	14.2%
58	April 21	8.3%	13.2%
59	April 28	8.1%	13.4%
60	May 5	8.2%	13.3%
61	May 12	7.7%	12.8%
62	May 19	7.9%	13.1%
63	May 26	—	11.0%
64	June 2	—	11.8%
65	June 9	7.2%	10.7%
66	June 16	6.7%	11.5%
67	June 23	—	11.7%
68	June 30	—	9.5%
69	July 7	—	11.1%
70	July 14	—	10.5%
71	July 21	—	10.2%
72	July 28	—	10.7%
73	August 4	—	10.2%
74	August 11	7.0%	8.7%
75	August 18	—	9.8%
76	August 25	6.6%	8.4%
77	September 1	—	10.5%
78	September 8	6.5%	10.5%
79	September 15	—	9.8%
80	September 22	—	9.4%
81	September 29	—	9.8%
82	October 6	—	10.5%
83	October 13	—	10.5%
84	October 20	—	10.8%
85	October 27	7.7%	11.6%
86	November 3	7.5%	12.1%
87	November 10	7.0%	8.3%
88	November 17	8.2%	11.0%
89 (last episode)	November 24, 2013	—	8.0%

=== Season 3 ===
List of ratings (Episodes 322–578 / Season 3 Episodes 1–257)

Episode #	Original Airdate	TNmS Ratings (Nationwide)	AGB Ratings (Nationwide)
1	December 1, 2013	9.3%	14.8%
2	December 8	10.2%	15.8%
3	December 15	9.4%	13.9%
4	December 22	9.9%	14.5%
5	December 29, 2013	9.2%	11.9%
6	January 5, 2014	9.2%	13.8%
7	January 12	9.7%	13.7%
8	January 19	10.4%	13.6%
9	January 26	10.2%	13.8%
10	February 2	10.9%	13.9%
11	February 9	10.8%	14.5%
12	February 16	10.7%	13.7%
13	February 23	11.3%	15.4%
14	March 2	9.8%	12.9%
15	March 9	10.8%	15.4%
16	March 16	9.8%	15.0%
17	March 23	10.2%	13.9%
18	March 30	9.4%	12.2%
19	April 6	10.5%	12.2%
20	April 13	9.5%	13.1%
21	May 11	8.6%	11.0%
22	May 18	9.4%	11.0%
23	May 25	10.5%	13.6%
24	June 1	9.5%	10.4%
25	June 8	8.4%	8.0%
26	June 15	8.9%	11.4%
27	June 22	8.9%	10.7%
28	June 29	10.1%	10.8%
29	July 6	12.4%	14.2%
30	July 13	14.5%	14.2%
31	July 20	12.3%	13.5%
32	July 27	11.2%	13.3%
33	August 3	12.2%	12.8%
34	August 10	12.8%	14.1%
35	August 17	12.6%	13.4%
36	August 24	12.5%	12.6%
37	August 31	11.5%	12.1%
38	September 7	10.8%	10.4%
39	September 14	12.8%	14.4%
40	September 21	16.4%	23.3%
41	October 5	14.3%	17.1%
42	October 12	15.5%	18.2%
43	October 19	11.9%	14.3%
44	October 26	13.6%	15.2%
45	November 2	13.2%	15.6%
46	November 9	15.1%	16.6%
47	November 16	15.5%	17.2%
48	November 23	15.0%	16.9%
49	November 30	16.1%	16.3%
50	December 7	15.1%	16.9%
51	December 14	17.3%	19.0%
52	December 21	16.8%	18.6%
53	December 28, 2014	15.7%	17.2%
54	January 11, 2015	14.9%	15.9%
55	January 18	16.1%	16.5%
56	January 25	16.2%	15.8%
57	February 1	15.1%	14.2%
58	February 8	15.7%	16.0%
59	February 15	14.3%	13.1%
60	February 22	14.8%	13.2%
61	March 1	13.6%	14.4%
62	March 8	13.9%	12.3%
63	March 15	14.2%	14.4%
64	March 22	14.5%	15.2%
65	March 29	13.6%	13.2%
66	April 5	14.6%	12.3%
67	April 12	14.5%	14.8%
68	April 19	16.4%	16.2%
69	April 26	14.2%	15.3%
70	May 3	15.1%	14.0%
71	May 10	14.1%	13.4%
72	May 17	12.8%	13.5%
73	May 24	12.3%	13.9%
74	May 31	13.5%	14.1%
75	June 7	13.7%	13.2%
76	June 14	15.0%	15.5%
77	June 21	16.2%	17.5%
78	June 28	15.4%	18.0%
79	July 5	14.3%	15.7%
80	July 12	16.6%	18.7%
81	July 19	13.2%	16.9%
82	July 26	13.4%	17.2%
83	August 2	12.8%	14.1%
84	August 9	13.8%	15.0%
85	August 16	15.0%	15.5%
86	August 23	13.4%	12.6%
87	August 30	14.3%	13.0%
88	September 6	13.6%	14.5%
89	September 13	13.2%	13.9%
90	September 20	15.8%	14.6%
91	September 27	10.0%	11.0%
92	October 4	13.6%	13.5%
93	October 18	13.9%	13.6%
94	October 25	13.6%	13.5%
95	October 25	13.9%	13.6%
96	November 8	16.3%	19.3%
97	November 15	14.4%	16.8%
98	November 22	12.7%	13.8%
99	November 29	12.6%	15.6%
100	December 6	13.0%	13.7%
101	December 13	14.4%	14.8%
102	December 20	13.1%	15.8%
103	December 27, 2015	12.4%	16.1%
104	January 3, 2016	15.0%	18.0%
105	January 10	15.1%	16.2%
106	January 17	14.9%	15.7%
107	January 24	16.7%	16.2%
108	January 31	16.6%	15.2%
109	February 7	14.1%	13.4%
110	February 14	20.0%	19.2%
111	February 21	16.5%	16.7%
112	February 28	15.6%	15.1%
113	March 6	15.8%	15.8%
114	March 13	14.6%	14.6%
115	March 20	16.1%	14.8%
116	March 27	16.6%	16.8%
117	April 3	14.3%	14.8%
118	April 10	15.8%	15.3%
119	April 17	16.4%	15.5%
120	April 24	15.4%	15.0%
121	May 1	16.0%	15.4%
122	May 8	13.2%	15.6%
123	May 15	15.8%	18.5%
124	May 22	14.7%	16.3%
125	May 29	14.2%	15.9%
126	June 5	11.4%	12.7%
127	June 12	14.9%	18.4%
128	June 19	14.4%	16.0%
129	June 26	14.2%	16.2%

Episode #	Original Airdate	TNmS Ratings (Nationwide)	AGB Ratings (Nationwide)
130	July 3	15.0%	17.5%
131	July 10	13.7%	16.1%
132	July 17	14.2%	17.7%
133	July 24	15.9%	17.2%
134	July 31	13.9%	15.7%
135	August 7	15.3%	16.5%
136	August 14	14.8%	14.7%
137	August 21	18.0%	19.9%
138	August 28	18.2%	18.2%
139	September 4	17.2%	17.0%
140	September 11	15.1%	16.8%
141	September 18	15.5%	16.3%
142	September 25	15.5%	16.3%
143	October 2	14.5%	16.7%
144	October 9	15.2%	15.9%
145	October 16	16.4%	16.5%
146	October 23	15.9%	17.4%
147	October 30	15.4%	16.8%
148	November 6	15.7%	16.2%
149	November 13	15.6%	17.8%
150	November 20	15.9%	17.5%
151	November 27	18.0%	18.7%
152	December 4	15.9%	16.3%
153	December 11	18.0%	19.8%
154	December 18	15.6%	16.5%
155	December 25, 2016	18.4%	19.0%
156	January 1, 2017	18.0%	18.5%
157	January 8	18.0%	19.3%
158	January 15	18.3%	20.3%
159	January 22	19.2%	20.4%
160	January 29	14.2%	16.9%
161	February 5	16.7%	18.8%
162	February 12	15.5%	18.4%
163	February 19	15.5%	17.5%
164	February 26	13.4%	17.0%
165	March 5	13.5%	17.7%
166	March 12	10.5%	12.3%
167	March 19	11.6%	14.0%
168	March 26	17.7%	17.7%
169	April 2	16.2%	16.3%
170	April 9	13.7%	14.8%
171	April 16	14.1%	13.9%
172	April 23	13.8%	13.7%
173	April 30	14.2%	15.2%
174	May 7	13.0%	14.0%
175	May 14	10.6%	14.2%
176	May 21	13.5%	12.5%
177	May 28	13.2%	14.6%
178	June 4	12.9%	14.1%
179	June 11	12.8%	15.3%
180	June 18	13.5%	15.3%
181	June 25	14.5%	15.4%
182	July 2	15.1%	16.4%
183	July 9	16.2%	16.8%
184	July 16	16.5%	17.4%
185	July 23	16.3%	16.1%
186	July 30	15.3%	13.9%
187	August 6	14.9%	14.5%
188	August 13	15.0%	13.9%
189	August 20	15.9%	16.3%
190	August 27	15.2%	15.7%
191	September 3	14.7%	14.7%
192	September 10	16.7%	15.9%
193	October 1	13.8%	15.0%
194	October 8	13.6%	14.7%
195	October 15	14.7%	14.6%
196	October 22	15.3%	15.5%
197	December 31, 2017	12.0%	11.1%
198	January 7, 2018	18.0%	18.7%
199	January 14	17.2%	18.2%
200	January 21	15.6%	15.2%
201	January 28	16.7%	17.3%
202	February 4	15.7%	15.4%
203	February 11	12.9%	13.9%
204	February 25	15.6%	14.4%
205	March 4	16.9%	16.4%
206	March 11	14.0%	14.0%
207	March 18	15.4%	13.6%
208	March 25	14.1%	13.9%
209	April 1	14.9%	13.4%
210	April 8	14.8%	13.6%
211	April 15	13.2%	12.0%
212	April 22	14.9%	14.5%
213	April 29	13.7%	11.7%
214	May 6	12.3%	10.4%
215	May 13	13.7%	12.6%
216	May 20	12.3%	10.8%
217	May 27	10.6%	11.0%
218	June 3	11.8%	10.9%
219	June 10	13.4%	10.4%
220	June 17	12.4%	10.7%
221	June 24	13.8%	12.6%
222	July 1	15.3%	13.6%
223	July 8	13.5%	12.4%
224	July 15	14.5%	11.6%
225	July 22	13.6%	11.9%
226	July 29	13.2%	10.9%
227	August 5	14.4%	11.6%
228	August 12	14.0%	12.6%
229	August 19	14.9%	13.6%
230	September 2	17.4%	14.8%
231	September 9	—	13.2%
232	September 16	—	13.6%
233	September 23	—	9.7%
234	September 30	—	12.5%
235	October 7	—	11.2%
236	October 14	—	11.2%
237	October 21	—	12.7%
238	October 28	—	12.9%
239	November 4	—	13.9%
240	November 11	—	14.4%
241	November 18	—	13.3%
242	November 25	—	12.2%
243	December 2	—	13.1%
244	December 9	—	13.6%
245	December 16	—	14.4%
246	December 23	—	16.3%
247	December 30, 2018	—	14.5%
248	January 6, 2019	—	15.4%
249	January 13	—	15.3%
250	January 20	—	15.7%
251	January 27	—	14.9%
252	February 3	—	11.8%
253	February 10	—	13.9%
254	February 17	—	15.1%
255	February 24	—	13.7%
256	March 3	—	14.1%
257	March 10, 2019	—	14.4%

=== Season 4 ===
List of ratings (Episodes 579–present / Season 4 Episodes 1–present)

Numbers in red represent the highest rated episode of the year while numbers in blue represent the lowest rated episode of the year.

==== 2019-2020 ====
Ratings of episodes aired in 2019-2020

Episode #	Original Airdate	AGB Ratings			
Episode #	Original Airdate	Nationwide		Seoul Capital Area	
Episode #	Original Airdate	Part 1	Part 2	Part 1	Part 2
1	December 8, 2019	12.5%	15.7%	11.8%	14.6%
2	December 15	11.6%	15.1%	10.8%	14.4%
3	December 22	10.6%	13.1%	9.9%	12.4%
4	December 29	10.1%	13.6%	9.8%	12.1%
5	January 5, 2020	9.8%	12.1%	9.1%	11.3%
6	January 12	9.7%	11.4%	9.4%	10.5%
7	January 19	9.1%	11.6%	8.6%	11.1%
8	January 26	7.4%	9.2%	6.8%	8.5%
9	February 2	8.9%	10.7%	8.6%	10.4%
10	February 9	9.6%	11.3%	9.6%	10.5%
11	February 16	9.4%	12.8%	9.3%	12.1%
12	February 23	7.9%	9.4%	7.6%	8.4%
13	March 1	7.5%	10.0%	7.3%	9.6%
14	March 8	9.0%	12.8%	8.6%	12.0%
15	March 15	8.3%	13.0%	7.8%	12.5%
16	March 22	8.9%	12.8%	8.4%	11.7%
17	March 29	8.7%	11.0%	8.5%	10.6%
18	April 5	7.8%	10.1%	7.5%	9.6%
19	April 12	7.1%	10.8%	6.7%	10.5%
20	April 19	8.9%	10.9%	7.8%	10.0%
21	April 26	7.9%	10.4%	7.4%	9.8%
22	May 3	7.0%	8.9%	6.1%	7.5%
23	May 10	6.3%	9.0%	5.9%	8.4%
24	May 17	7.2%	10.4%	7.2%	9.8%
25	May 24	7.6%	10.9%	7.4%	10.5%
26	May 31	7.2%	10.0%	6.3%	9.0%
27	June 7	6.7%	8.5%	6.0%	7.5%
28	June 14	6.6%	9.1%	6.3%	8.3%
29	June 21	7.7%	9.7%	7.4%	9.2%
30	June 28	6.5%	9.5%	5.7%	8.8%
31	July 5	7.2%	9.6%	6.9%	9.4%
32	July 12	8.9%	11.3%	8.4%	10.5%
33	July 19	7.7%	11.2%	7.3%	10.5%
34	July 26	6.7%	9.3%	5.9%	8.9%
35	August 2	7.1%	10.1%	6.5%	9.7%
36	August 9	7.9%	9.7%	8.0%	9.6%
37	August 16	5.9%	8.4%	5.4%	7.9%
38	August 23	6.8%	10.6%	7.2%	10.5%
39	August 30	8.1%	10.5%	8.2%	9.7%
40	September 6	7.8%	10.6%	7.4%	9.7%
41	September 13	7.7%	10.4%	7.0%	9.3%
42	September 20	7.1%	9.3%	6.9%	8.9%
43	September 27	7.0%	9.6%	7.1%	9.1%
44	October 4	7.8%	%	7.1%	%
45	October 11	8.1%	10.8%	7.5%	9.6%
46	October 18	7.7%	9.9%	7.3%	9.4%
47	October 25	8.1%	10.6%	7.8%	10.0%
48	November 1	9.6%	11.2%	9.5%	10.4%
49	November 8	8.7%	11.8%	8.6%	11.6%
50	November 15	9.1%	11.4%	8.8%	10.6%
51	November 22	8.8%	11.6%	8.0%	10.5%
52	November 29	10.8%	13.8%	10.6%	13.9%
53	December 6	10.5%	12.7%	10.2%	12.0%
54	December 13	10.7%	12.4%	10.2%	11.4%
55	December 20	8.4%	12.7%	7.8%	12.1%
56	December 27	10.5%	13.6%	9.9%	13.0%

==== 2021 ====
Ratings of episodes aired in 2021

Episode #	Original Airdate	AGB Ratings			
Episode #	Original Airdate	Nationwide		Seoul Capital Area	
Episode #	Original Airdate	Part 1	Part 2	Part 1	Part 2
57	January 3	10.4%	12.4%	10.1%	11.6%
58	January 10	10.4%	12.9%	9.6%	11.5%
59	January 17	10.2%	14.1%	9.7%	13.2%
60	January 24	9.2%	11.9%	8.4%	10.7%
61	January 31	9.2%	11.5%	8.5%	10.6%
62	February 7	9.0%	14.0%	8.5%	13.5%
63	February 14	8.8%	12.3%	8.4%	11.5%
64	February 21	8.0%	11.3%	7.7%	10.5%
65	February 28	9.1%	12.5%	8.7%	11.7%
66	March 7	8.4%	12.6%	8.0%	11.7%
67	March 14	8.2%	11.4%	7.8%	10.7%
68	March 21	7.8%	11.2%	7.2%	10.5%
69	March 28	7.7%	11.2%	7.6%	10.6%
70	April 4	9.0%	11.3%	8.3%	10.1%
71	April 11	7.8%	10.7%	6.9%	9.5%
72	April 18	7.8%	11.0%	7.3%	10.4%
73	April 25	8.1%	11.2%	6.9%	9.9%
74	May 2	7.4%	11.2%	6.6%	10.3%
75	May 9	7.5%	10.1%	6.9%	9.1%
76	May 16	9.2%	12.3%	8.3%	11.5%
77	May 23	8.7%	11.2%	7.9%	10.5%
78	May 30	8.8%	11.3%	8.4%	11.0%
79	June 6	7.2%	9.9%	6.4%	8.7%
80	June 13	8.1%	9.5%	7.9%	8.4%
81	June 20	7.4%	10.5%	7.0%	9.5%
82	June 27	7.6%	11.1%	7.1%	10.3%

Episode #	Original Airdate	AGB Ratings	
Episode #	Original Airdate	Nationwide	Seoul Capital Area
83	July 4	10.5%	10.1%
84	July 11	10.8%	10.4%
85	July 18	10.2%	9.2%
86	August 8	11.4%	10.4%
87	August 15	10.5%	10.0%
88	August 22	10.2%	9.8%
89	August 29	10.2%	9.6%
90	September 5	10.5%	9.2%
91	September 12	10.2%	9.0%
92	September 19	8.3%	8.0%
93	September 26	8.6%	7.3%
94	October 3	9.7%	9.1%
95	October 10	9.8%	9.6%
96	October 17	10.1%	8.8%
97	October 24	10.5%	10.0%
98	October 31	10.1%	8.9%
99	November 7	9.4%	8.0%
100	November 14	10.3%	9.2%
101	November 21	10.2%	9.4%
102	November 28	11.0%	10.3%
103	December 5	9.9%	9.0%
104	December 12	11.7%	10.8%
105	December 19	11.9%	11.1%
106	December 26	12.2%	11.2%

==== 2022 ====
Ratings of episodes aired in 2022

Episode #	Original Airdate	AGB Ratings	
Episode #	Original Airdate	Nationwide	Seoul Capital Area
107	January 2	12.0%	11.7%
108	January 9	12.8%	11.9%
109	January 16	11.6%	10.8%
110	January 23	10.6%	10.1%
111	January 30	9.5%	8.5%
112	February 13	12.8%	11.8%
113	February 20	15.6%	14.9%
114	February 27	11.5%	10.6%
115	March 6	11.9%	11.0%
116	March 13	12.0%	11.0%
117	March 20	10.0%	9.6%
118	March 27	11.2%	10.2%
119	April 3	11.3%	10.4%
120	April 10	10.8%	10.0%
121	April 17	9.9%	9.1%
122	April 24	9.4%	8.6%
123	May 1	8.4%	8.0%
124	May 8	9.7%	9.2%
125	May 15	9.9%	9.6%
126	May 22	10.0%	9.8%
127	May 29	9.9%	9.2%
128	June 5	10.4%	9.3%
129	June 12	9.9%	9.0%
130	June 19	9.1%	8.3%
131	June 26	9.8%	9.4%
132	July 3	8.6%	7.7%
133	July 10	9.1%	8.8%
134	July 17	9.8%	8.8%
135	July 24	9.0%	8.5%
136	July 31	11.1%	10.6%
137	August 7	10.9%	10.3%
138	August 14	9.4%	8.9%
139	August 21	10.6%	9.8%
140	August 28	10.3%	9.0%
141	September 4	11.9%	11.3%
142	September 11	9.6%	9.0%
143	September 18	10.5%	9.9%
144	September 25	10.8%	9.3%
145	October 2	10.8%	10.2%
146	October 9	9.9%	9.2%
147	October 16	10.9%	10.1%
148	October 23	11.3%	10.4%
149	November 6	10.2%	8.9%
150	November 13	11.5%	10.8%
151	November 20	10.9%	10.4%
152	November 27	11.6%	10.6%
153	December 4	11.7%	10.8%
154	December 11	11.2%	10.1%
155	December 18	10.6%	9.8%
156	December 25	10.9%	9.8%

==== 2023 ====
Ratings of episodes aired in 2023

Episode #	Original Airdate	AGB Ratings	
Episode #	Original Airdate	Nationwide	Seoul Capital Area
157	January 1	10.0%	8.7%
158	January 8	11.1%	10.6%
159	January 15	10.6%	10.1%
160	January 22	7.3%	6.5%
161	January 29	10.3%	9.4%
162	February 5	10.3%	9.3%
163	February 12	10.1%	9.3%
164	February 19	10.2%	9.5%
165	February 26	10.1%	9.6%
166	March 5	9.4%	9.0%
167	March 12	9.8%	8.5%
168	March 19	9.5%	9.0%
169	March 26	9.2%	8.5%
170	April 2	8.4%	7.5%
171	April 9	8.4%	7.5%
172	April 16	8.6%	7.3%
173	April 23	9.1%	8.1%
174	April 30	7.4%	6.6%
175	May 7	9.3%	8.1%
176	May 14	7.3%	6.4%
177	May 21	7.6%	7.0%
178	May 28	8.5%	7.7%
179	June 4	7.4%	7.1%
180	June 11	7.7%	7.0%
181	June 18	8.0%	7.1%
182	June 25	7.7%	6.6%
183	July 2	7.3%	6.3%
184	July 9	7.9%	7.5%
185	July 23	8.2%	7.5%
186	July 30	7.8%	7.3%
187	August 6	8.0%	8.0%
188	August 13	7.1%	6.4%
189	August 20	7.6%	7.1%
190	August 27	8.1%	7.5%
191	September 3	8.9%	7.8%
192	September 10	7.5%	6.6%
193	September 17	8.4%	7.4%
194	September 24	7.1%	6.2%
195	October 8	7.5%	6.6%
196	October 15	7.0%	6.3%
197	October 22	7.7%	6.5%
198	October 29	7.4%	6.5%
199	November 5	9.2%	8.3%
200	November 12	8.5%	7.7%
201	November 19	7.9%	6.8%
202	November 26	8.5%	7.0%
203	December 3	9.2%	8.3%
204	December 10	8.6%	8.0%
205	December 17	9.7%	N/A
206	December 24	8.2%	N/A
207	December 31	8.6%	N/A

==== 2024 ====
Ratings of episodes aired in 2024

Episode #	Original Airdate	AGB Ratings	
Episode #	Original Airdate	Nationwide	Seoul Capital Area
208	January 7	9.6%	9.0%
209	January 14	9.3%	8.9%
210	January 21	9.4%	8.7%
211	January 28	8.7%	7.6%
212	February 4	8.5%	7.4%
213	February 11	7.0%	5.9%
214	February 18	9.5%	9.2%
215	February 25	9.0%	7.4%
216	March 3	8.2%	7.8%
217	March 10	8.3%	7.2%
218	March 17	7.6%	7.2%
219	March 24	8.1%	7.4%
220	March 31	7.6%	7.1%
221	April 7	7.7%	6.8%
222	April 14	6.3%	5.6%
223	April 21	7.1%	6.1%
224	April 28	6.7%	6.2%
225	May 5	7.5%	6.2%
226	May 12	6.8%	6.7%
227	May 19	6.9%	6.4%
228	May 26	8.3%	7.6%
229	June 2	7.1%	6.7%
230	June 9	6.1%	6.0%
231	June 16	6.2%	6.1%
232	June 23	6.9%	6.7%
233	June 30	8.0%	7.8%
234	July 7	8.0%	8.0%
235	July 14	6.8%	6.7%
236	July 21	6.8%	6.5%
237	August 18	8.2%	7.6%
238	August 25	7.8%	7.5%
239	September 1	7.8%	7.5%
240	September 8	8.5%	8.0%
241	September 15	6.3%	5.7%
242	September 22	8.2%	8.0%
243	September 29	7.8%	7.5%
244	October 6	8.4%	8.5%
245	October 13	6.9%	6.8%
246	October 20	8.3%	7.7%
247	October 27	8.4%	8.1%
248	November 3	8.9%	8.7%
249	November 10	8.6%	8.3%
250	November 17	7.8%	7.4%
251	November 24	8.4%	8.0%
252	December 1	9.3%	9.1%
253	December 8	9.1%	8.3%
254	December 15	8.5%	7.7%
255	December 22	9.4%	8.9%

==== 2025 ====
Ratings of episodes aired in 2025

Episode #	Original Airdate	AGB Ratings	
Episode #	Original Airdate	Nationwide	Seoul Capital Area
256	January 5	9.3%	8.7%
257	January 12	9.5%	8.9%
258	January 19	8.0%	7.6%
259	January 26	7.6%	6.8%
260	February 2	8.8%	8.6%
261	February 9	8.7%	7.8%
262	February 16	8.3%	8.0%
263	February 23	8.5%	7.9%
264	March 2	8.3%	7.5%
265	March 9	8.1%	7.8%
266	March 16	8.0%	7.9%
267	March 23	7.2%	7.0%
268	March 30	8.0%	7.3%
269	April 6	7.6%	7.2%
270	April 13	7.9%	8.0%
271	April 20	7.5%	6.9%
272	April 27	7.1%	6.9%
273	May 4	5.9%	5.3%
274	May 11	6.5%	6.3%
275	May 18	6.6%	5.8%
276	May 25	7.0%	6.5%
277	June 1	7.0%	6.5%
278	June 8	6.2%	6.3%
279	June 15	6.9%	6.2%
280	June 22	5.4%	5.2%
281	June 29	6.4%	6.2%
282	July 6	6.6%	6.2%
283	July 13	8.0%	7.5%
284	July 20	6.5%	6.0%
285	July 27	6.4%	6.0%
286	August 3	7.7%	7.3%
287	August 10	6.3%	5.5%
288	August 17	6.3%	5.8%
289	August 24	6.0%	5.6%
290	August 31	6.0%	5.4%
291	September 7	5.9%	5.4%
292	September 14	6.9%	6.4%
293	September 21	6.9%	5.7%
294	September 28	7.4%	6.8%
295	October 5	5.5%	4.5%
296	October 12	7.3%	6.1%
297	October 19	6.3%	5.9%
298	October 26	7.3%	6.3%
299	November 2	7.5%	6.5%
300	November 9	6.7%	6.1%
301	November 16	8.2%	6.6%
302	November 23	6.9%	6.1%
303	November 30	6.8%	5.9%
304	December 7	6.3%	5.9%
305	December 14	7.2%	6.6%
306	December 21	6.6%	5.9%
307	December 28	6.2%	5.8%

==== 2026 ====
Ratings of episodes aired in 2026

Episode #	Original Airdate	AGB Ratings	
Episode #	Original Airdate	Nationwide	Seoul Capital Area
308	January 4	6.9%	5.5%
309	January 11	7.2%	6.1%
310	January 18	6.9%	6.2%
311	January 25	7.6%	6.9%
312	February 1	8.7%	8.2%
313	February 8	8.1%	7.4%
314	February 15	6.2%	5.2%
315	February 22	8.4%	7.6%
316	March 1	7.2%	6.1%
317	March 8	8.6%	8.3%
318	March 15	6.7%	5.9%
319	March 22	7.0%	6.3%
320	March 29	7.2%	6.8%
321	April 5	5.9%	5.1%
322	April 12	6.2%	5.5%
323	April 19	5.9%	5.0%
324	April 26	7.0%	6.3%
325	May 3	6.8%	6.1%
326	May 10	6.5%	5.7%
327	May 17	5.5%	5.0%
328	May 24	5.5%	4.5%
329	May 31	6.2%	5.6%
330	June 7	7.1%	6.3%
331	June 14	6.9%	6.7%
332	June 21	6.9%	6.2%
333	June 28	6.0%	5.1%
334	July 5	7.4%	6.7%
335	July 12	6.6%	5.7%
336	July 19	6.4%	5.4%
337	July 26	6.3%	5.1%
338	August 2	6.0%	5.5%
339	August 9	7.0%	5.8%
340	August 16	7.2%	5.7%
341	August 30	7.3%	5.8%
342	September 6	6.8%	6.0%
343	September 13	8.2%	7.4%
344	October 4	6.9%	5.9%
345	October 11	7.2%	6.2%
346	October 18	7.0%	6.0%
347	October 25	7.0%	5.6%
348	November 1	7.0%	5.7%
349	November 8	7.7%	7.1%
350	November 15	7.1%	6.2%
351	November 22	%	%
352	November 29	%	%
