= Sea Train (Korail) =

2007–2023 South Korean tourist train

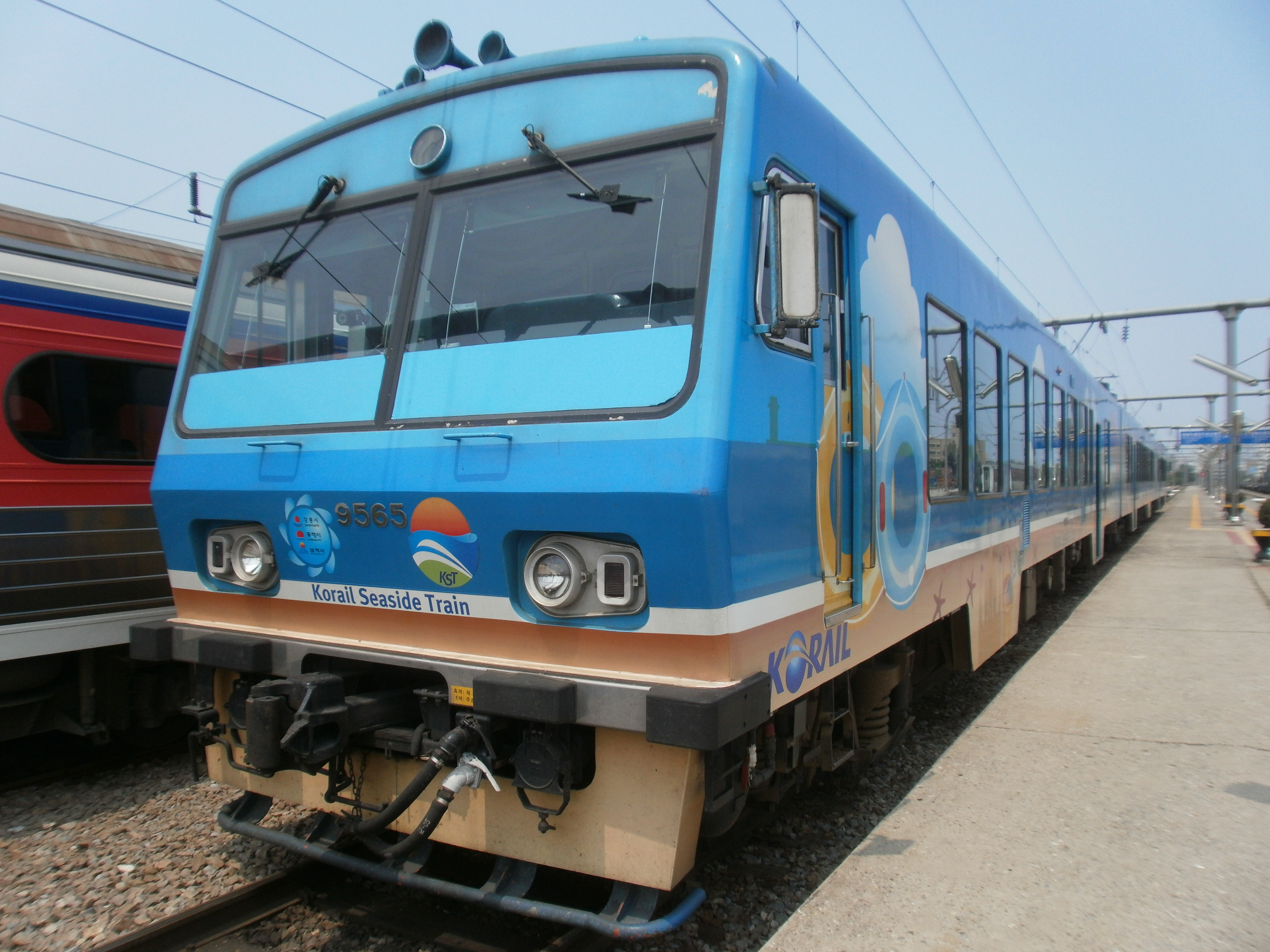

Overview
- Service type: Regional rail
- Status: Operating
- Locale: South Korea
- First service: July 25, 2007
- Last service: December 25, 2023
- Former operator: Korail Tourism Development

Route
- Termini: Gangneung station Samcheok Haebyeon station
- Stops: 6
- Average journey time: 1 hour & 10 minutes
- Lines used: Yeongdong Line; Samcheok Line

On-board services
- Class: First Class (2 cars)
- Seating arrangements: Individual seats and seats for facing the window
- Catering facilities: On-board café

Technical
- Rolling stock: Korail CDC
- Track gauge: 1,435 mm (4 ft 8 1/2 in) standard gauge
- Track owner: Korail

Sea Train (Korean: 바다열차) was a South Korean tourist train operated by the Korail Tourism Development. The train operated between 2007 and 2023, transporting tourists along the eastern coast of South Korea.

== Overview ==
The train began running on July 25, 2007, and traveled 58 kilometers (36 miles) through Gangneung, Donghae, and Samcheok all in Gangwon-do, providing views of the Sea of Japan. These three communities, along with Korail, developed the rail trip, with Korail contributing the passenger train service and the railroad, and the communities investing money to modify ordinary passenger cars into ones with seats that faced the sea.

Sometimes called the "ocean train", it was one of the industrial-era train renovations and part of Korail's Tourism Development initiative in the mid-2000s to change existing coal industry railway lines, where service had declined, into tour lines.

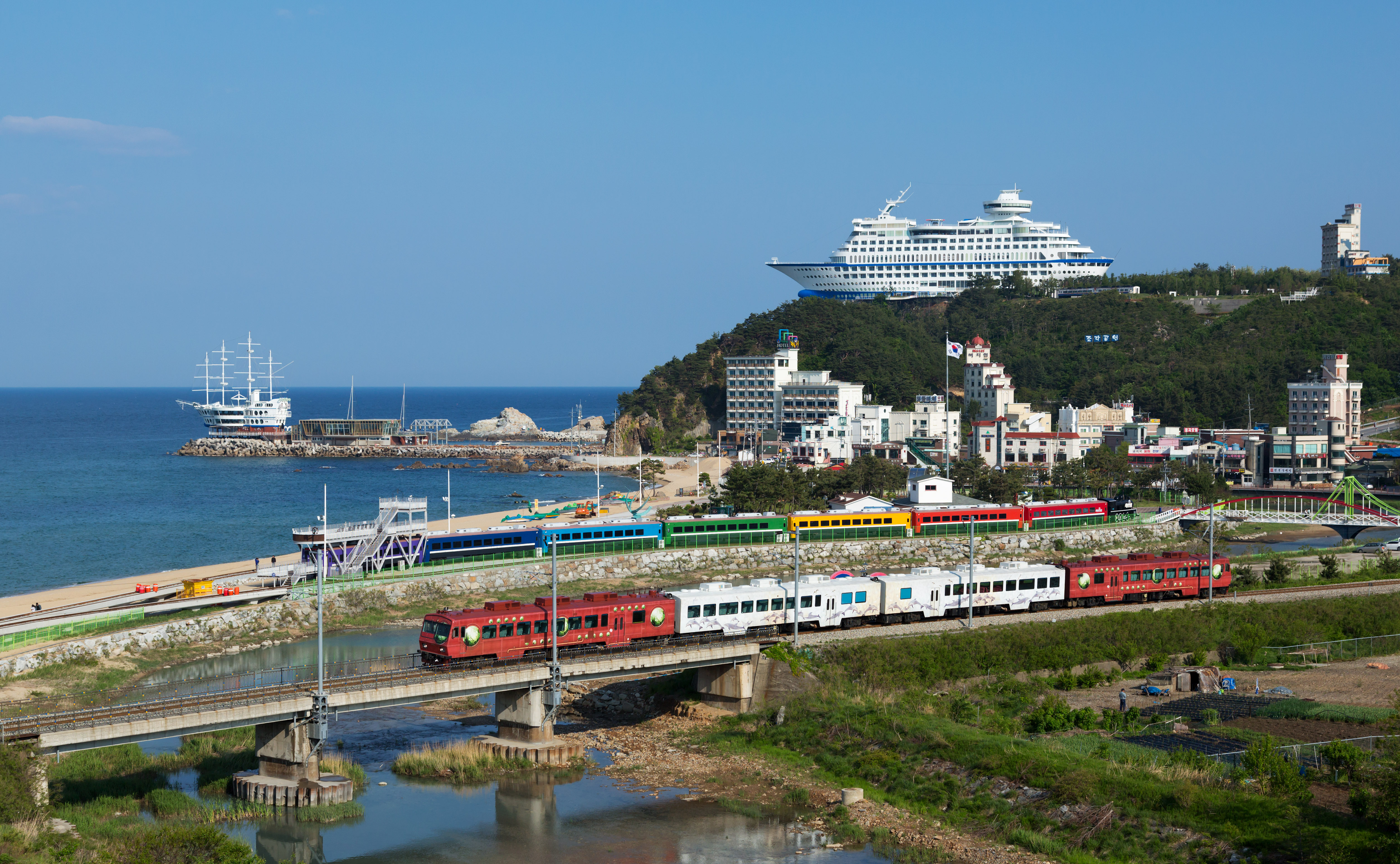
Sea Train arriving at Jeongdongjin station with Sun Cruise Resort & Yacht in background.

The train has four cars, three of them with seats that face the windows, for a full ocean-view and the fourth car has family seats where passengers can face each other. The interior walls are painted in ocean-blue colors to simulate an undersea world. Activities on the train include talks on the Gangneung and Samcheok regions, and music, including passenger requests via text message, and a marriage proposal room.

One of the train's stops was at Jeongdongjin station, which was made famous by a popular 90s Korean drama, The Hourglass. Jeongdongjin is one of the most popular travel destinations for Koreans to view the sunrise, and has several local tourist activities, like the rail bike which runs from Jeongdongjin Station to local spots.

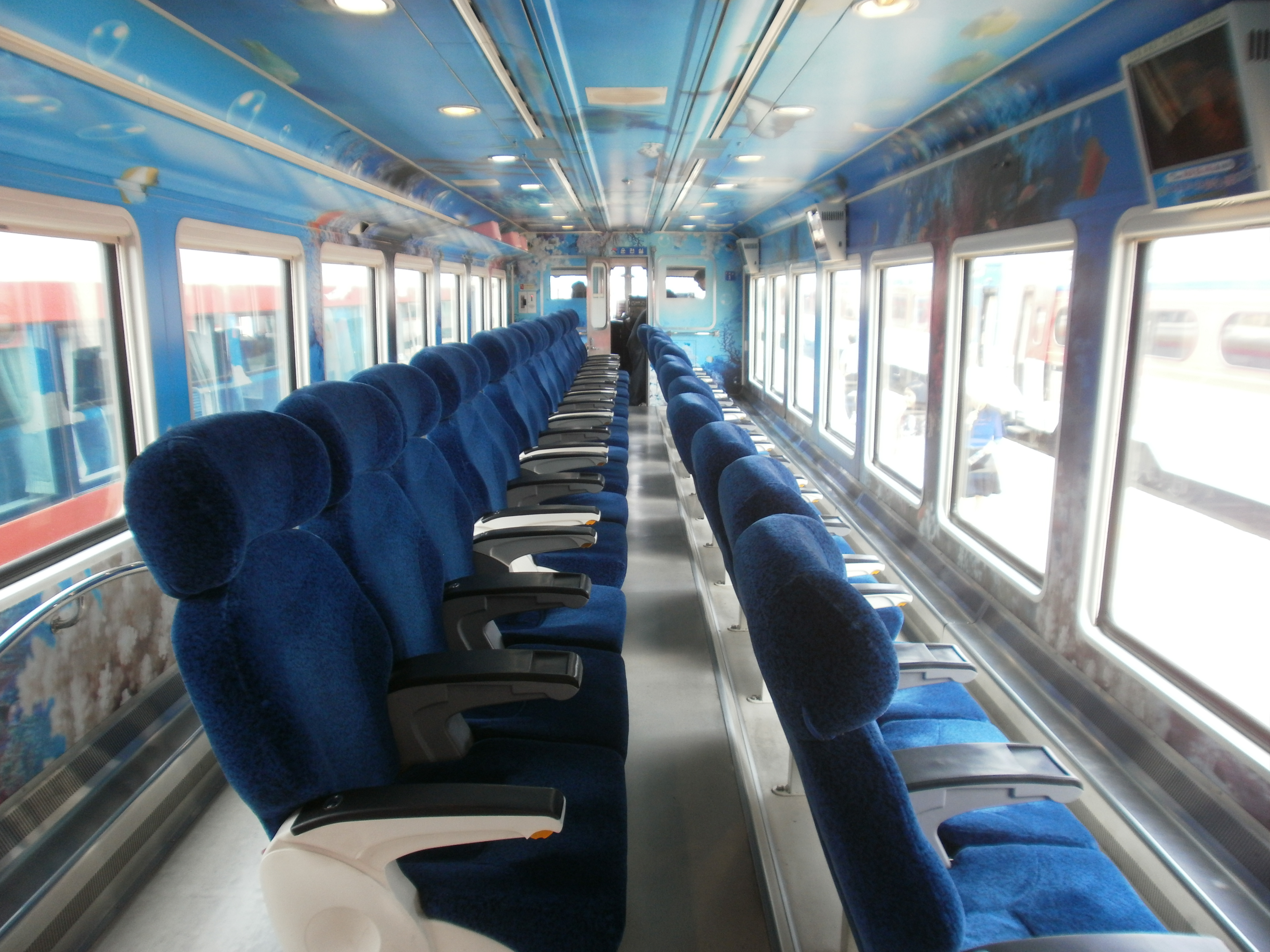
Sea Train interior

Due to the aging issue of the trains, the Sea Train ended its operation on 25 December 2023 after 16 years of service.

== Operations ==
- Started running: July 25, 2007
- Ended running: December 25, 2023
- Seoul to Sea Train stations: Cheongnyangni station in Seoul to Gangneung station, Donghae station from KTX trains
- Stations: Gangneung station - Jeongdongjin station - Mukho station - Donghae station - Chuam station - Samcheok Haebyeon station
- Approximate travel time: 1 hour 10 min.

== See also ==
- Jeongdongjin
- Jeongdongjin station
- Sun Cruise Resort & Yacht
