= Jinbu station =

Railway station in Jinbu-myeon, South Korea

진부 (오대산)
Jinbu
(Odaesan)
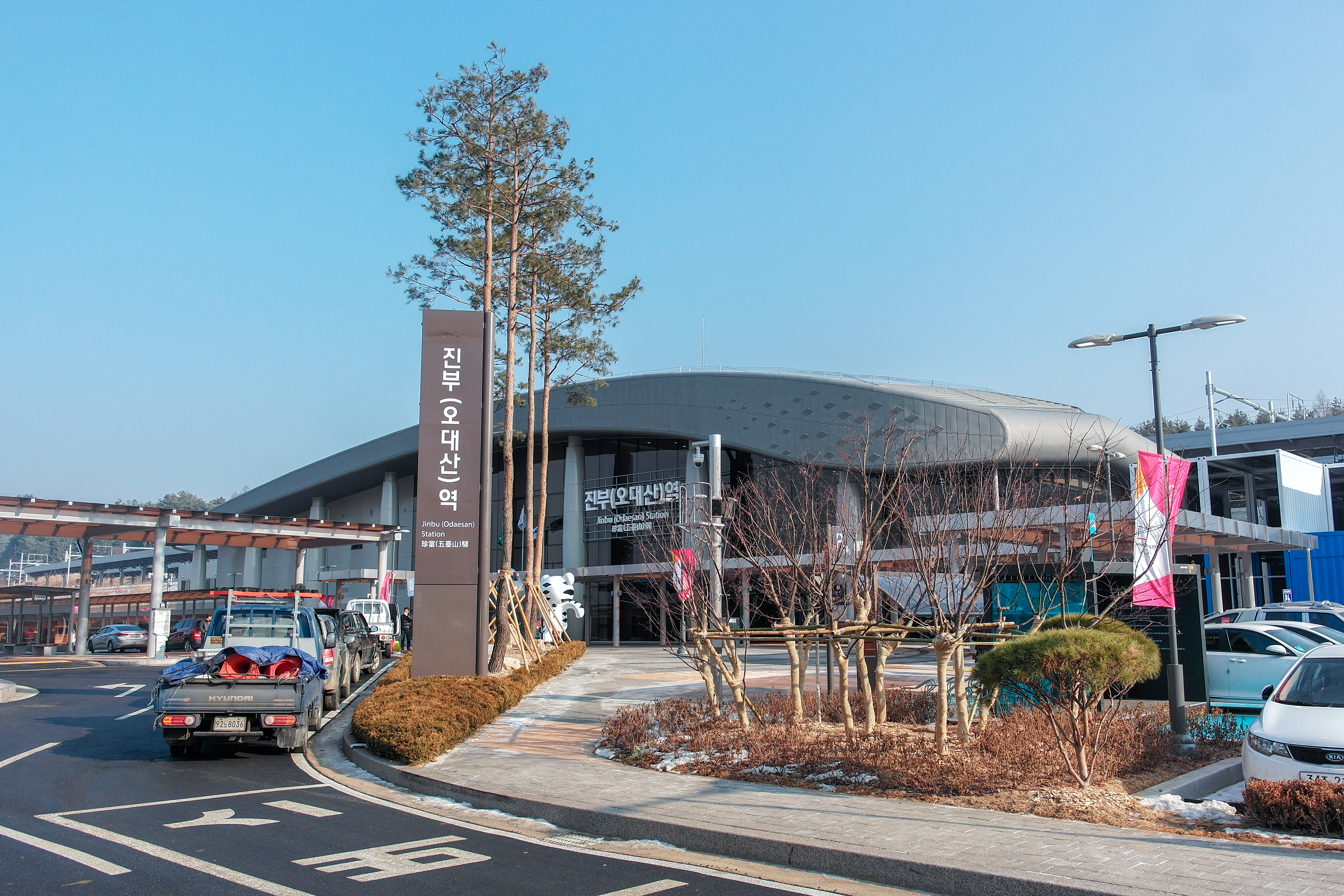

Korean name
- Hangul: 진부역
- Hanja: 珍富驛
- Revised Romanization: Jinbu-nyeok
- McCune–Reischauer: Chinbu-nyŏk

General information
- Location: 1370-3 Songjeong-ri, Jinbu-myeon; Pyeongchang-gun, Gangwon-do, South Korea
- Coordinates: 37°38′33″N 128°34′29″E
- Operator: Korail
- Line: Gangneung Line

Construction
- Structure type: Elevated

History
- Opened: December 22, 2017

Services
Preceding station	Korea Train Express	Following station
Pyeongchang towards Haengsin	Gangneung KTX	Gangneung Terminus
Pyeongchang towards Seoul	Gangneung KTX	Jeongdongjin towards Donghae
Location

Jinbu station is a railway station in Jinbu-myeon, Pyeongchang, South Korea. It is served by the Gangneung Line and is located near Odaesan National Park and the Pyeongchang Olympic Stadium. The station opened on 22 December 2017, ahead of the 2018 Winter Olympics, and is designed to accommodate 20-car trains deployed during the Olympics. The station cost 18.1 billion won (US$16.25 million) to construct over a 10-month period. During the Olympics, Jinbu station was served by shuttle buses that traveled to Olympic venues and other destinations.
