= Gojeoksan =

Mountain in Gangwon Province, South Korea

Highest point
- Elevation: 1,353.9 m (4,442 ft)

Geography
- Location: South Korea

Korean name
- Hangul: 고적산
- Hanja: 高積山
- RR: Gojeoksan
- MR: Kojŏksan

Gojeoksan (Korean: 고적산) is a mountain in Gangwon Province, South Korea. Its area extends across the cities of Donghae, Samcheok and Jeongseon County. Gojeoksan has an elevation of 1,353.9 m (4,442 ft).

== See also ==
- List of mountains in Korea
