= Sun Cruise Resort & Yacht =

Hotel resort built like a cruise ship in South Korea

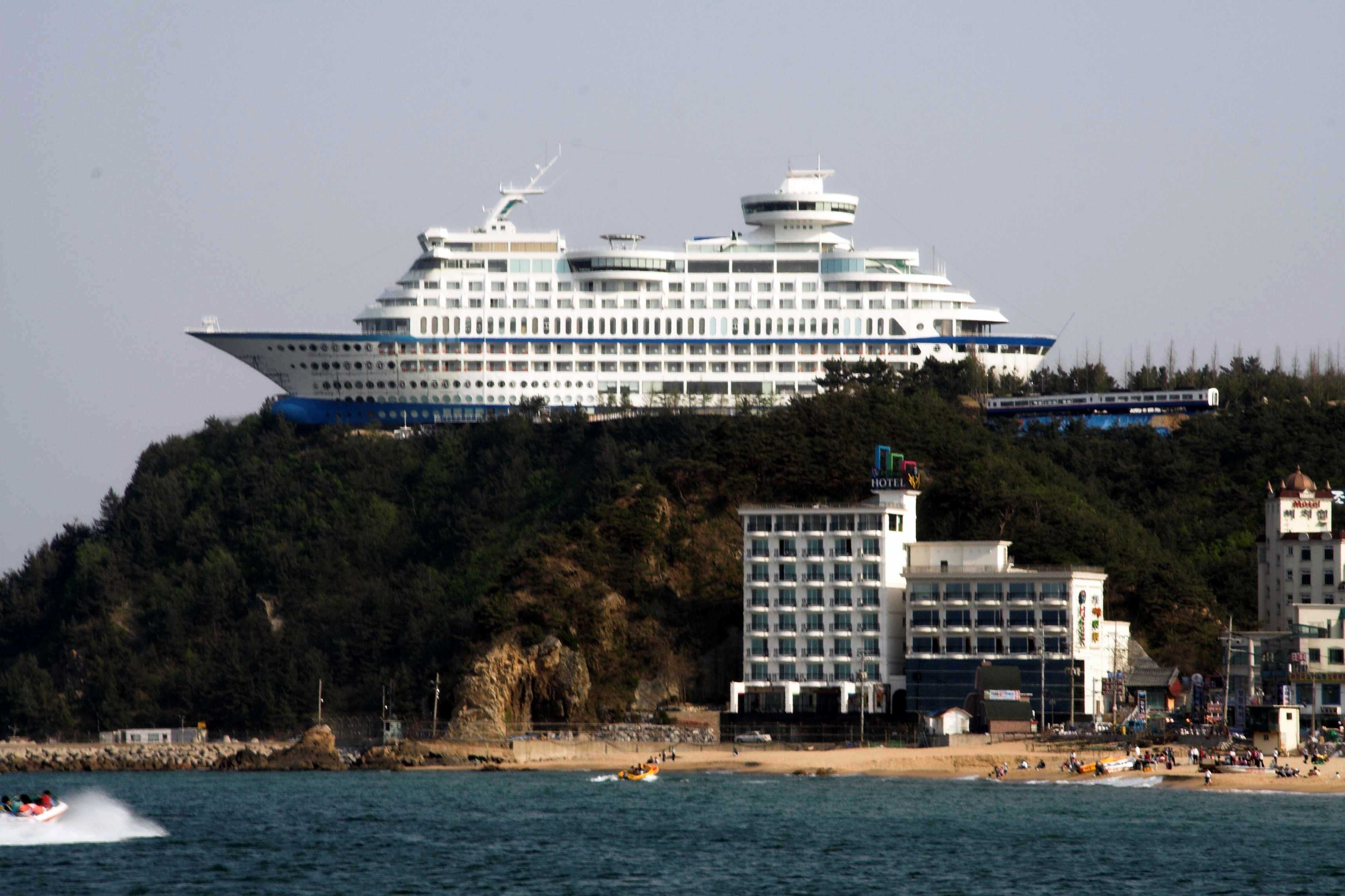
- Interactive map of the Sun Cruise Resort & Yacht area

General information
- Location: Jeongdongjin, South Korea
- Coordinates: 37°41′1″N 129°2′38″E
- Opening: 2002

Height
- Height: 45 metres (148 ft)

Other information
- Number of rooms: 211
- Number of restaurants: 6

Website
- esuncruise.com

Sun Cruise Resort & Yacht is a hotel resort in Jeongdongjin on the east coast of South Korea. Designed in the image of a cruise ship, notably the Royal Caribbean International Sovereign class, the hotel is 165 metres (541 ft) long and 45 metres (148 ft) tall and overlooks the beach resort.

Built at the top of a large cliff, the hotel looks out over the sea and gives the impression that a cruise ship has run aground.

The hotel has 211 rooms, including bedrooms and apartments, and six function rooms. There are six restaurants serving Korean and European food and a rotating bar on the top floor. Sporting facilities include a netted golf range, volleyball court, and a fitness club. The cruise ship theme is emphasised by the sound of crashing waves played on speakers throughout the hotel and the use of salt water in the swimming pool.

The resort also contains a park located adjacent to the hotel. Prominent within the landscaped gardens are "The Hands of Promise", two giant hands rising from the ground, along with a variety of other sculptures. There is also an observation area with a glass floor suspended above the sea, an exhibition hall, and a lake.

In 2003, the Titanic hotel, a construction with a similar cruise-ship theme, opened in Turkey.

== See also ==
- Jeongdongjin
- Jeongdongjin station
- Sea Train
