= Gangneung station =

Train station in South Korea

강릉
Gangneung
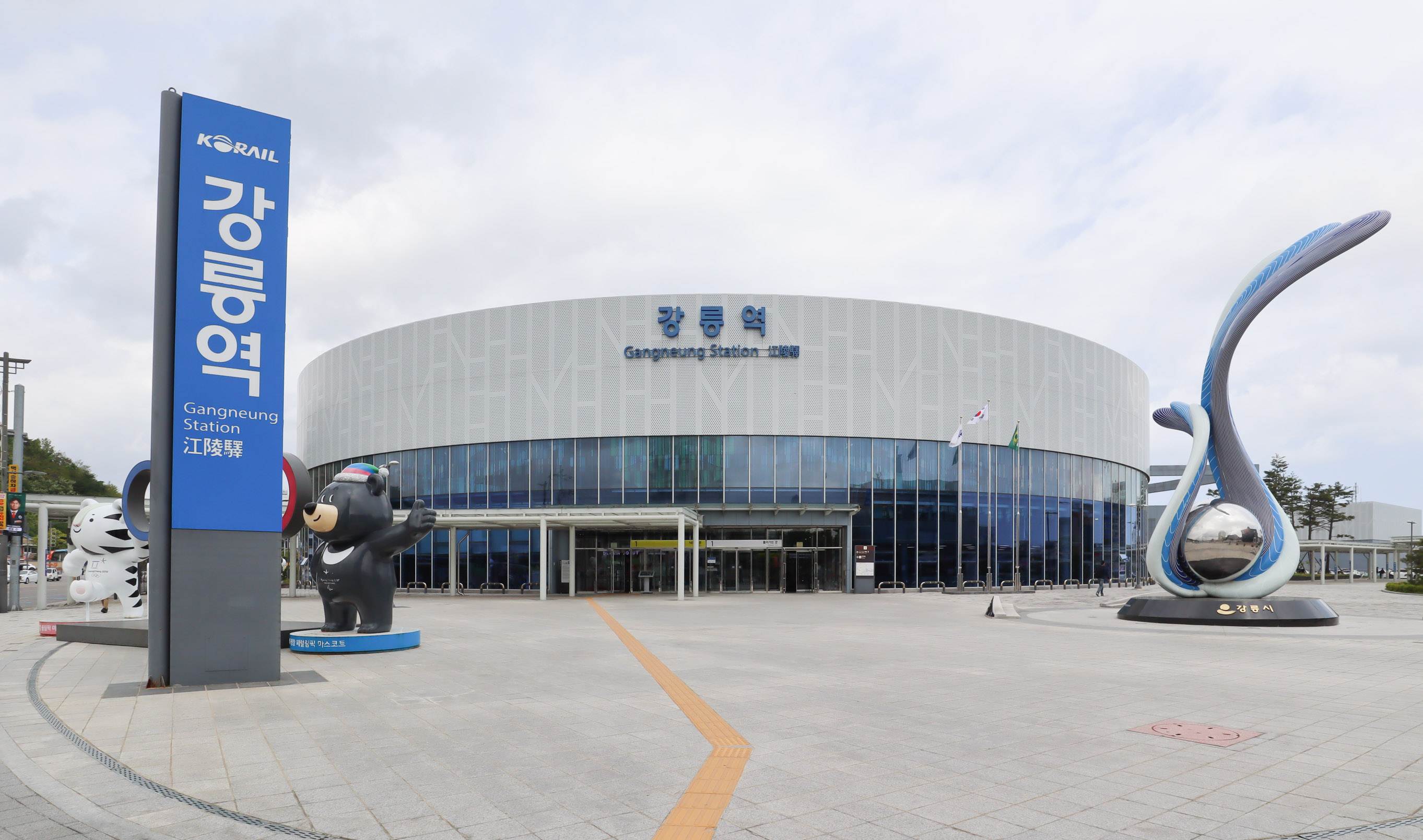
- Station building

Korean name
- Hangul: 강릉역
- Hanja: 江陵驛
- Revised Romanization: Gangneungnyeok
- McCune–Reischauer: Kangnŭngnyŏk

General information
- Location: Gyo-dong, Gangneung, Gangwon; South Korea
- Coordinates: 37°45′49.54″N 128°53′56.71″E
- Operator: Korail
- Lines: Yeongdong Line; Gangneung Line
- Platforms: 4
- Tracks: 4

Construction
- Structure type: Aboveground

History
- Opened: November 6, 1962
- Closed: September 15, 2014
- Rebuilt: December 22, 2017

Services
| Preceding station | Korea Train Express | Following station |
|---|---|---|
| Jinbu towards Haengsin | Gangneung KTX | Terminus |
| Jeongdongjin towards Bujeon | Donghae KTX | Terminus |
| Preceding station | Korail | Following station |
| Terminus | ITX-Maum Donghae Line | Jeongdongjin towards Bujeon |
| Terminus | Nuriro Yeongdong Line | Jeongdongjin towards Donghae |
| Jeongdongjin towards Dongdaegu | Nuriro Donghae Line | Terminus |
| Jeongdongjin towards Buncheon | Donghae Santa Train | Terminus |
Location

Gangneung station is a railway station on the Yeongdong Line and Gangneung Line in Gyo-dong, Gangneung, Gangwon, South Korea. All Sea Trains and Mugunghwa trains stopped at this station until September 14, 2014 when it was closed because of the construction of the Gangneung Line. Because of this, all Mugunghwa trains had terminated at Jeongdongjin station.

The Gangneung Line and Gangneung station opened at December 22, 2017. The KTX-Sancheon (now KTX-Eum) trains started stopping here. However, the Mugunghwa-ho trains terminated at Jeongdongjin station before July 18, 2018, before all of the Mugunghwa trains that terminated at Jeongdongjin got cut back to Donghae. This is because there were many KTX-Sancheon because of the 2018 Winter Olympics in Pyeongchang County.

== Gallery ==
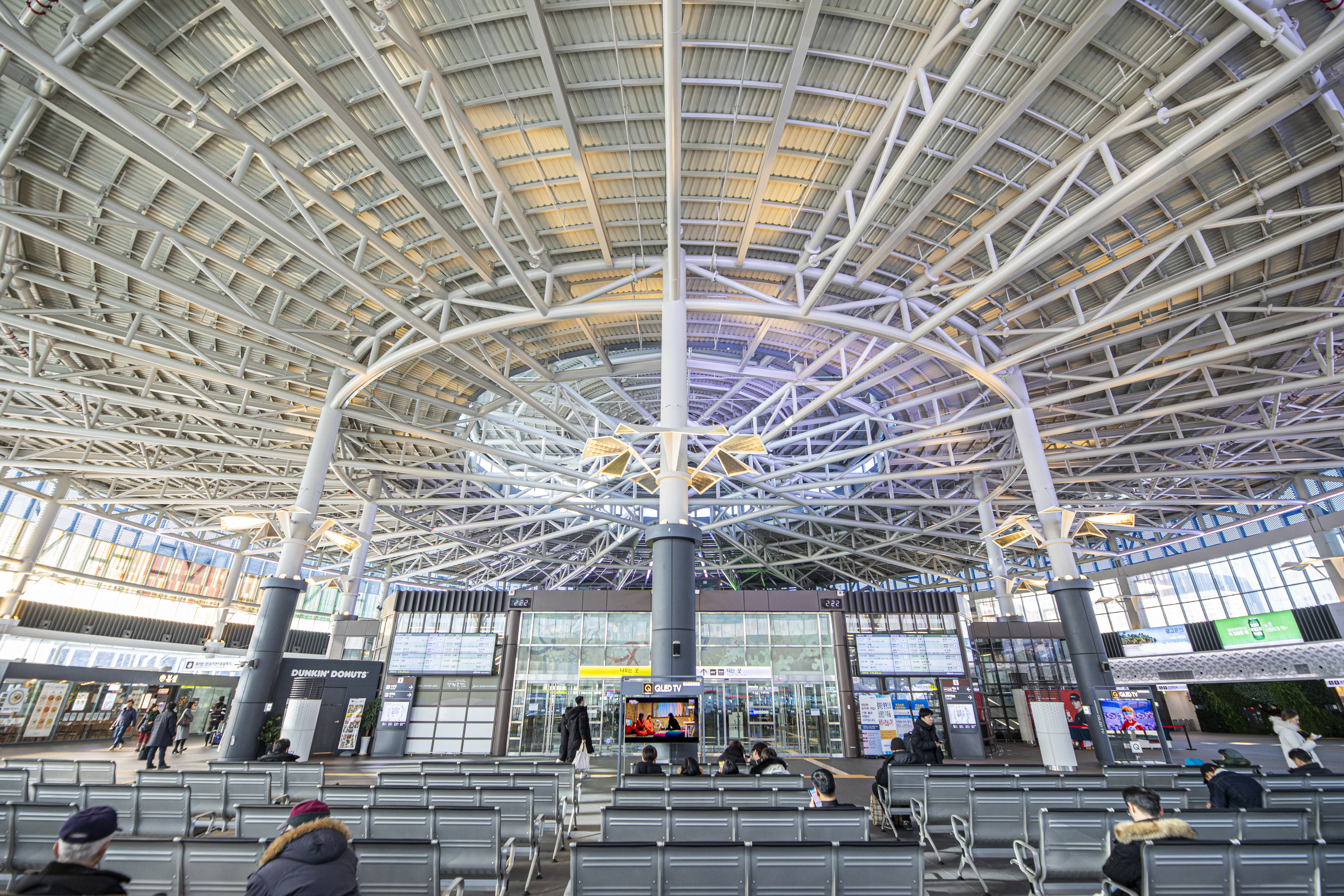

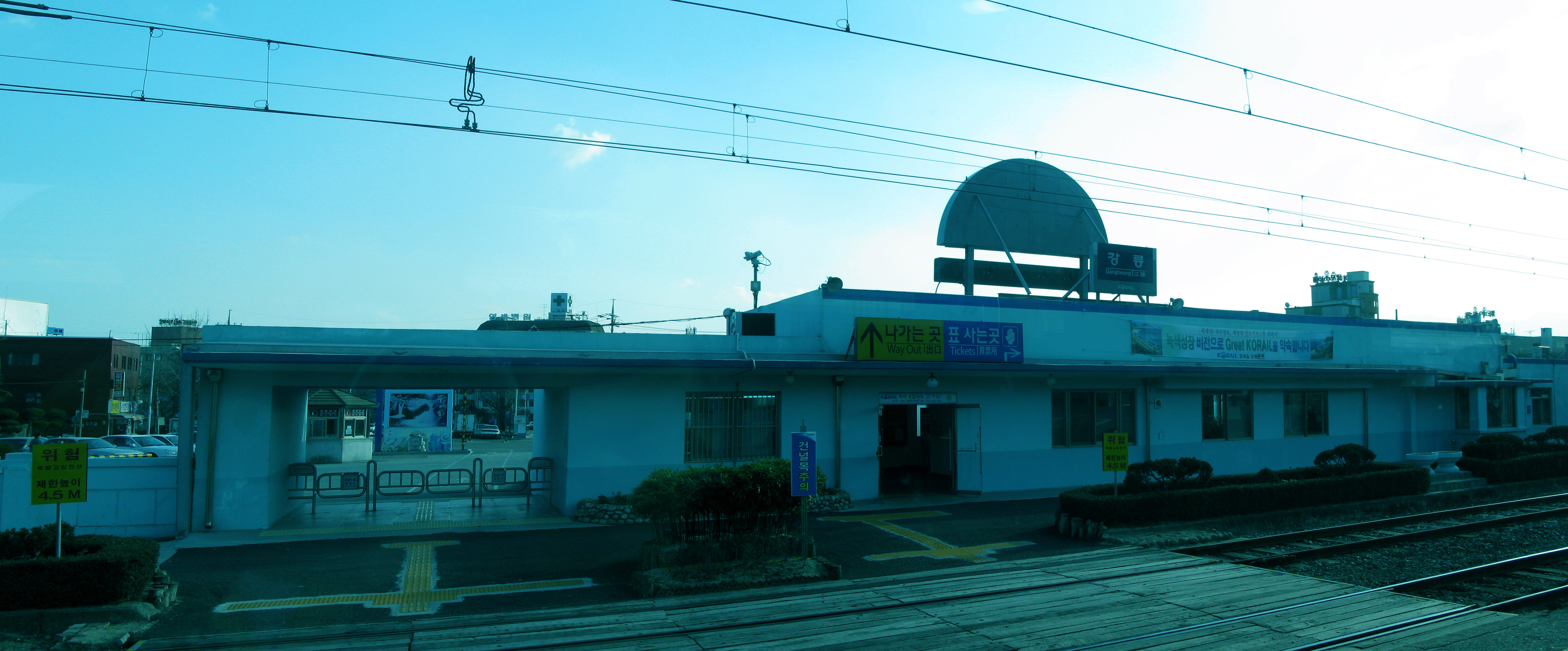

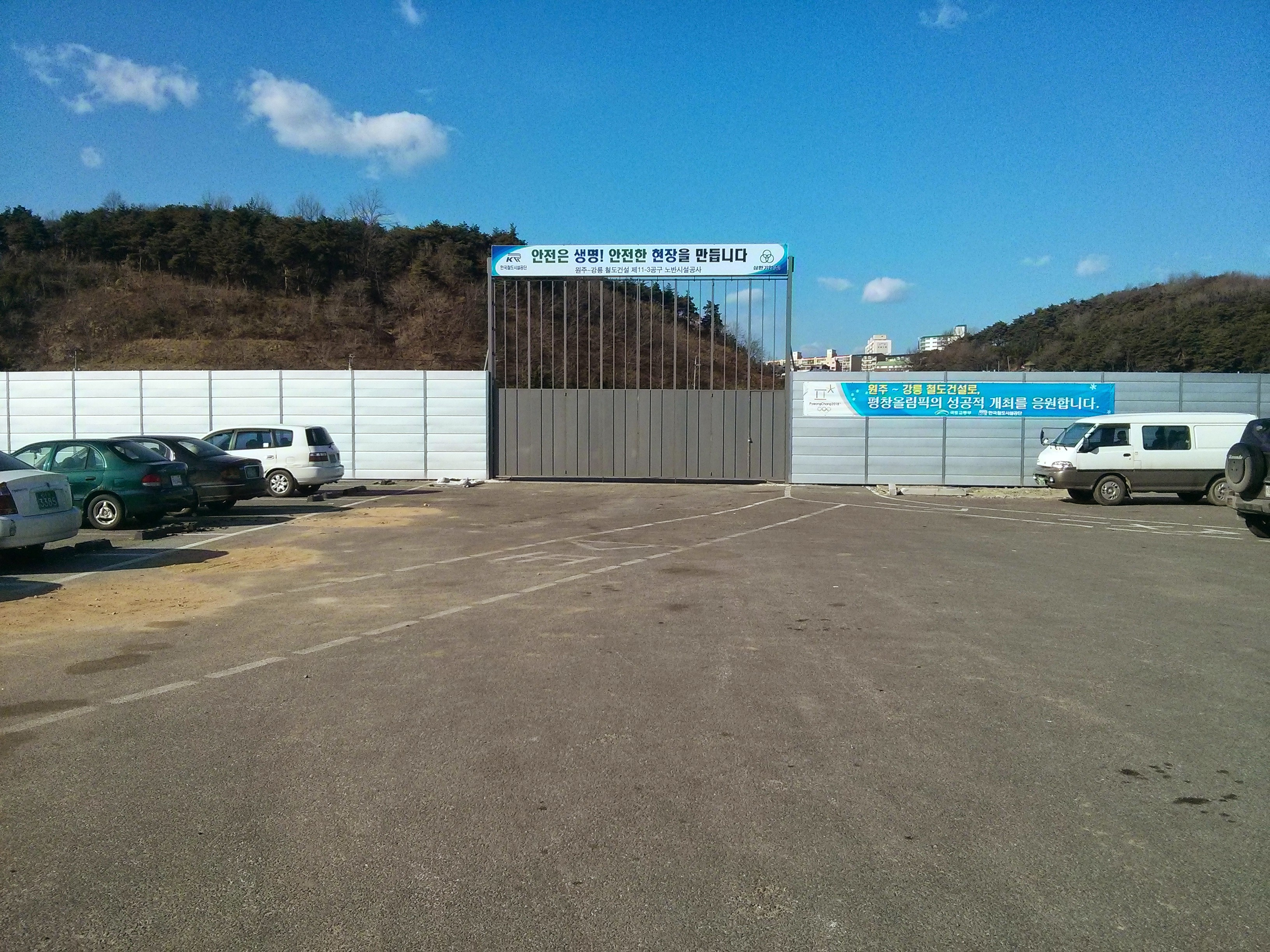
