= Mukho =

Port in South Korea

Korean name
- Hangul: 묵호항
- Hanja: 墨湖港
- Revised Romanization: Mukho-hang
- McCune–Reischauer: Mukho-hang

Mukho (Korean pronunciation: [mu.kʰo]) is a harbor in Donghae City, Gangwon Province, South Korea. It is located on the shore of the East Sea. In the past it played an important role in the shipping of iron ore and coal; much of this role has been taken over by Donghae Harbor in recent years. Mukho is an important harbor of refuge and home to a large number of fishing vessels.

A passenger ferry operates from the port to Ulleung Island. The harbor is connected to land-based transportation by two stations on the Yeongdong Line and an interchange on the Donghae Expressway. The ship Mangyongbong 92 carrying a 140 person delegation for the 2018 Winter Olympics from North Korea berthed at this harbor, as protesters opposing North Korea subsequently gathered singing Aegukga. The harbor first opened in 10.14.1937.

== See also ==
- Transportation in South Korea
- List of seaports
