= Jeongdongjin station =

Railway station in South Korea

정동진
Jeongdongjin

Korean name
- Hangul: 정동진역
- Hanja: 正東津驛
- Revised Romanization: Jeongdongjin yeok
- McCune–Reischauer: Chŏngdongjin yŏk

General information
- Location: Gangdong-myeon, Gangneung-Si, Gangwon Province; South Korea
- Coordinates: 37°41′28.89″N 129°1′59.94″E
- Operator: Korail
- Line: Yeongdong Line
- Platforms: 1
- Tracks: 3

Construction
- Structure type: Aboveground

Other information
- Station code: 262 (ARS)

History
- Opened: November 6, 1962
- Rebuilt: 15 March 1997
Location

Jeongdongjin station (Korean: 정동진역) is a railway station on the Yeongdong Line of Korail, the station closest to the beach in South Korea, and a popular cross country train destination from Seoul, for sunrise viewing. It is claimed to be listed in the Guinness World Records as being the closest station and tracks to a beach anywhere in the world.

== Location ==
The station, situated on the seashore of the Sea of Japan (East Sea), in Jeongdongjin in Gangneung, Gangwon Province, is the second station on the Yeongdong Line of Korail, in Gangwon-do, as it travels south along South Korea's eastern coast. It is located south of the Gangneung Station, where Yeongdong Line starts, and north of the third stop at Mukho station, Donghae, Gangwon-do.

From Cheongnyangni Station, Seoul to Jeongdongjin is five hours, by direct passenger service.

== History ==
The station opened in 1962 and was established originally for passenger and freight transport. However, as the coal industry prospered and the line started transporting more anthracite coal from a nearby mine, the passenger numbers dropped, as people started moving to other cities. In 1996, the station discontinued passenger services.

In 1997, passenger services resumed, which was largely credited to the growing popularity of a Korean drama, The Hourglass, which aired on television in 1995. The political crime series was considered one of the highest-rated TV productions in Korean drama history, and made locations, where the scenes were filmed, into popular tourist spots. One of those was at the beach-front train station, where a character, "with the wind breezing through her hair, waited at the platform for her train with the thrashing ocean waves behind her, before being taken into custody by the police right as her train arrived." In 2012, there were more visitors than train passengers at the station, who paid a small entrance fee of 500 won, to walk along the tracks and take photos.

The 1997 Asian financial crisis was also attributed to the resurgence of visitors to the station and the area. With many unemployed workers laid off, the first sunrise at Jeongdongjin was symbolically equated with hope and success, and visitors came seeking hope for a better future. Other local attractions, associating the sunrise with "time" are the "Hourglass Park" and a "Time Museum"; also, a rail bike trail, the yearly "Jeongdongjin Sunrise Festival" in late December, Sun Cruise Resort & Yacht, and other tourist activities, are nearby.

== Trains servicing ==
Jeongdongjin station is located on the main Yeongdong Line between Donghae and Gangneung. Almost all trains operating along the line stop, including KTX trains linking Seoul Station with Donghae and Nuriro trains linking Donghae with Gangneung. Mugunghwa-ho trains no longer run along this section of the Yeongdong Line.

In addition to Korail's regular passenger trains which stop at the station, in 1997, Korail started operating a "sunrise train", which ran from Seoul to Jeongdongjin, to take passengers solely to see the sunrise, and which operations were called a success, with approximately 2 million travelers by 1999. Note, the Sunrise train no longer runs.

Korail's regional tourist train, the Sea Train started operating on the Yeongdong Line in 2007, and stops for picture taking at the station.

Korail's hotel on wheels, the Rail Cruise Haerang, makes a stop at the station on its two-night, three-day Grand Tour of Korea itinerary.

== Present popularity ==
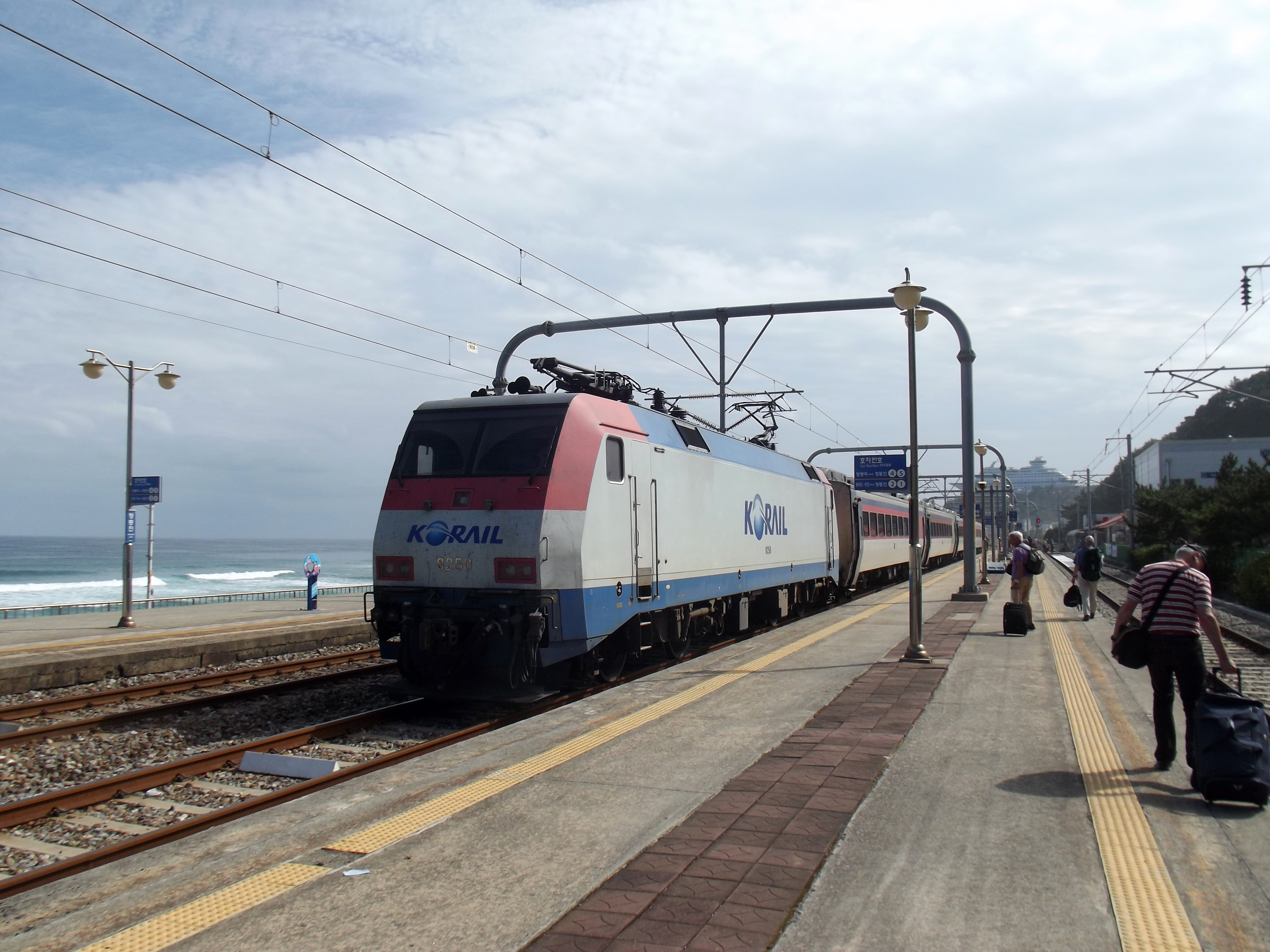
Jeongdongjin station and seaside, Sun Cruise Resort & Yacht seen at distance

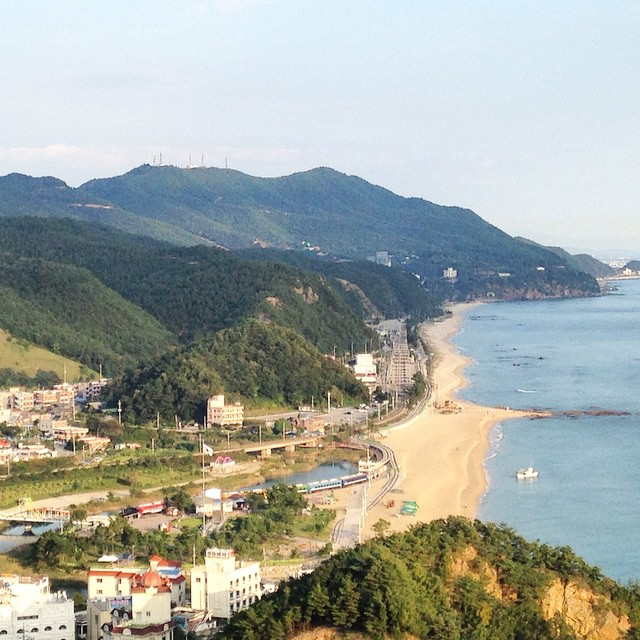
View of Jeongdongjin station from Sun Cruise Resort & Yacht

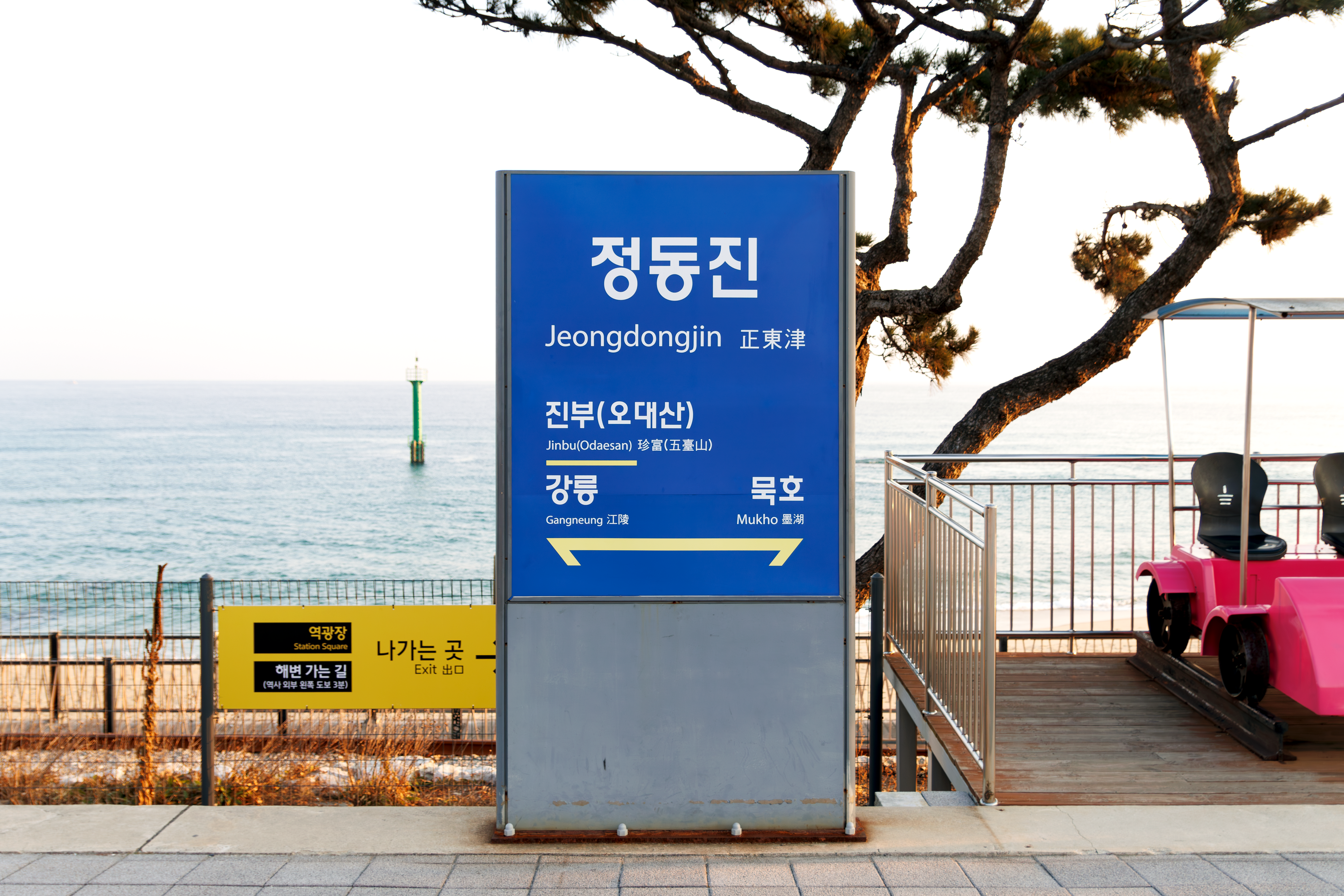
Station name board

In 2007, Oleg Kiriyanovit of The Korea Times said, "It would probably be difficult to find a South Korean who does not know the Jeongdongjin Railway Station situated on the seashore of the East Sea. Some people think that this is the most romantic and beautiful place in the whole country." In 2014, Yun Suh-young of the same newspaper, said Jeongdongjin itself, was considered to be one of the most popular travel destinations for Koreans, in particular a coming of age for college freshmen, as well as a cheap travel route for Seoul dwellers to travel by train to see the sunrise and return home without staying overnight. And, in 2016, thousands of tourists continued to gather for the first sunrise of the year.

== Operations and changes ==
- November 6, 1962: station opened.
- January 1, 1988: package handling stopped.
- January 1, 1996: passenger services stopped.
- March 15, 1997: terminal structure changes, passenger handling resumed.
- July 16, 2002: Saemaeul-ho train servicing stopped.
- September 30, 2005: cargo handling stopped.

== See also ==
- Jeongdongjin
- Sun Cruise Resort & Yacht
- Sea Train
