= Gangneung =

City in Gangwon, South Korea

- Municipal city
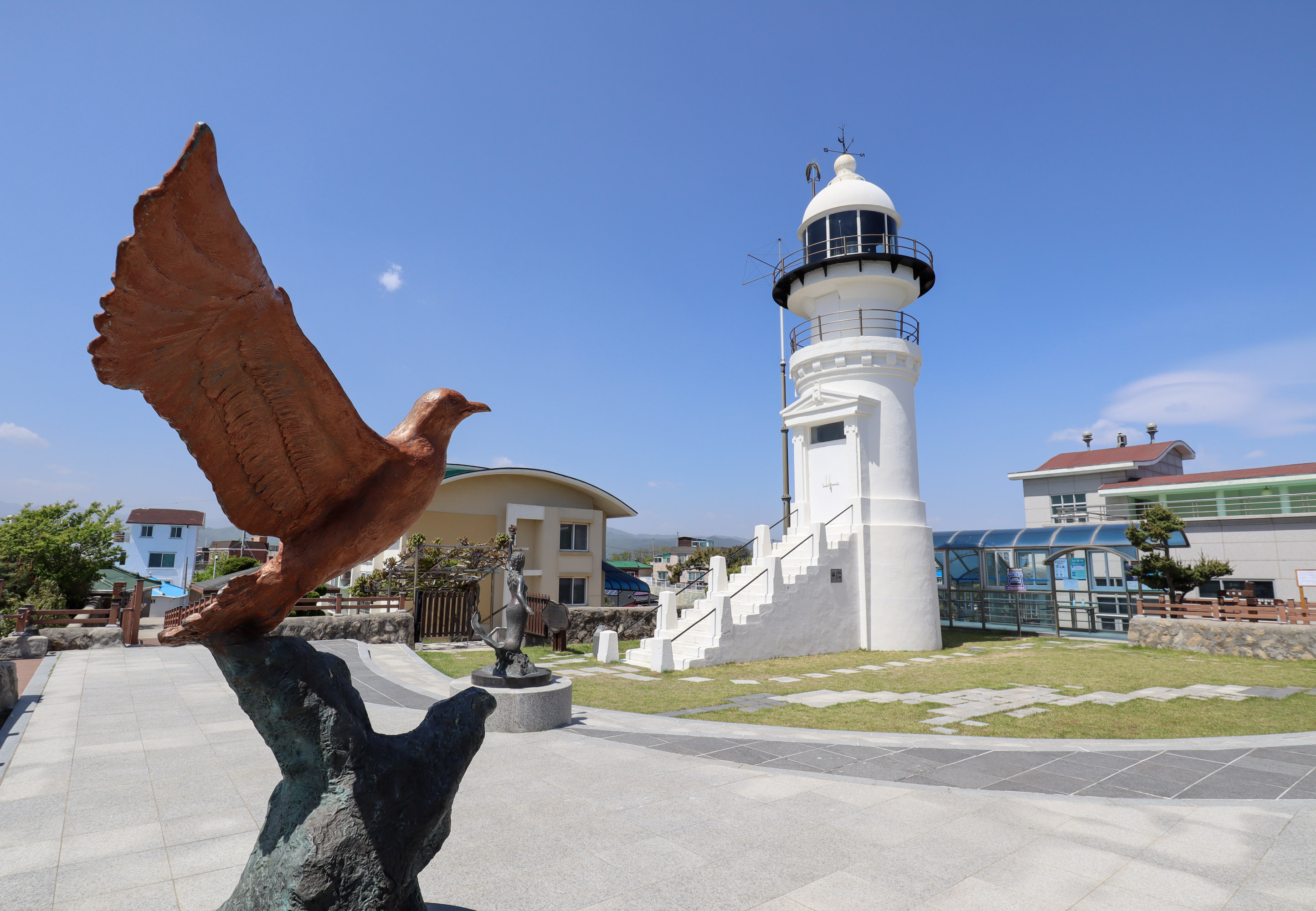
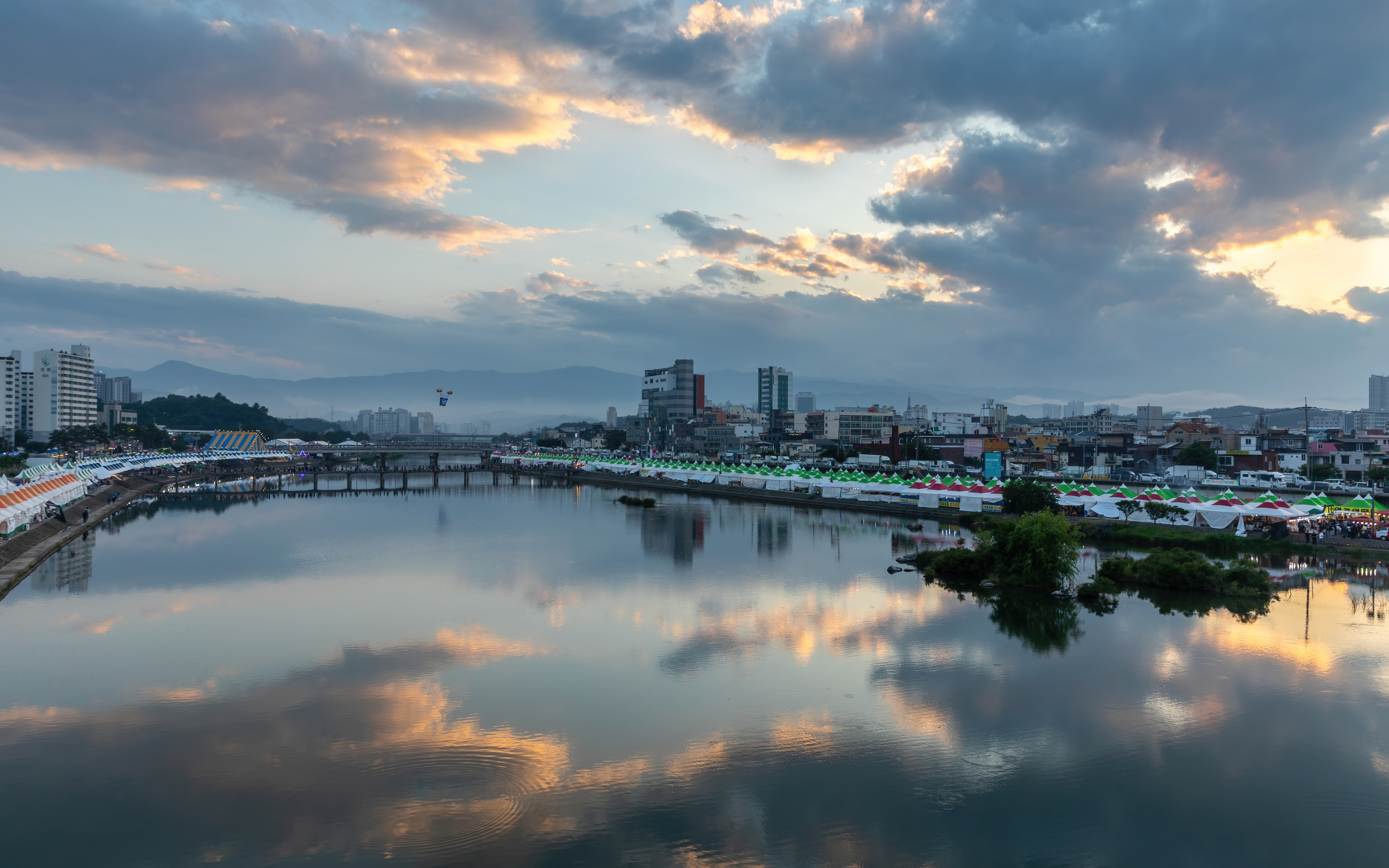
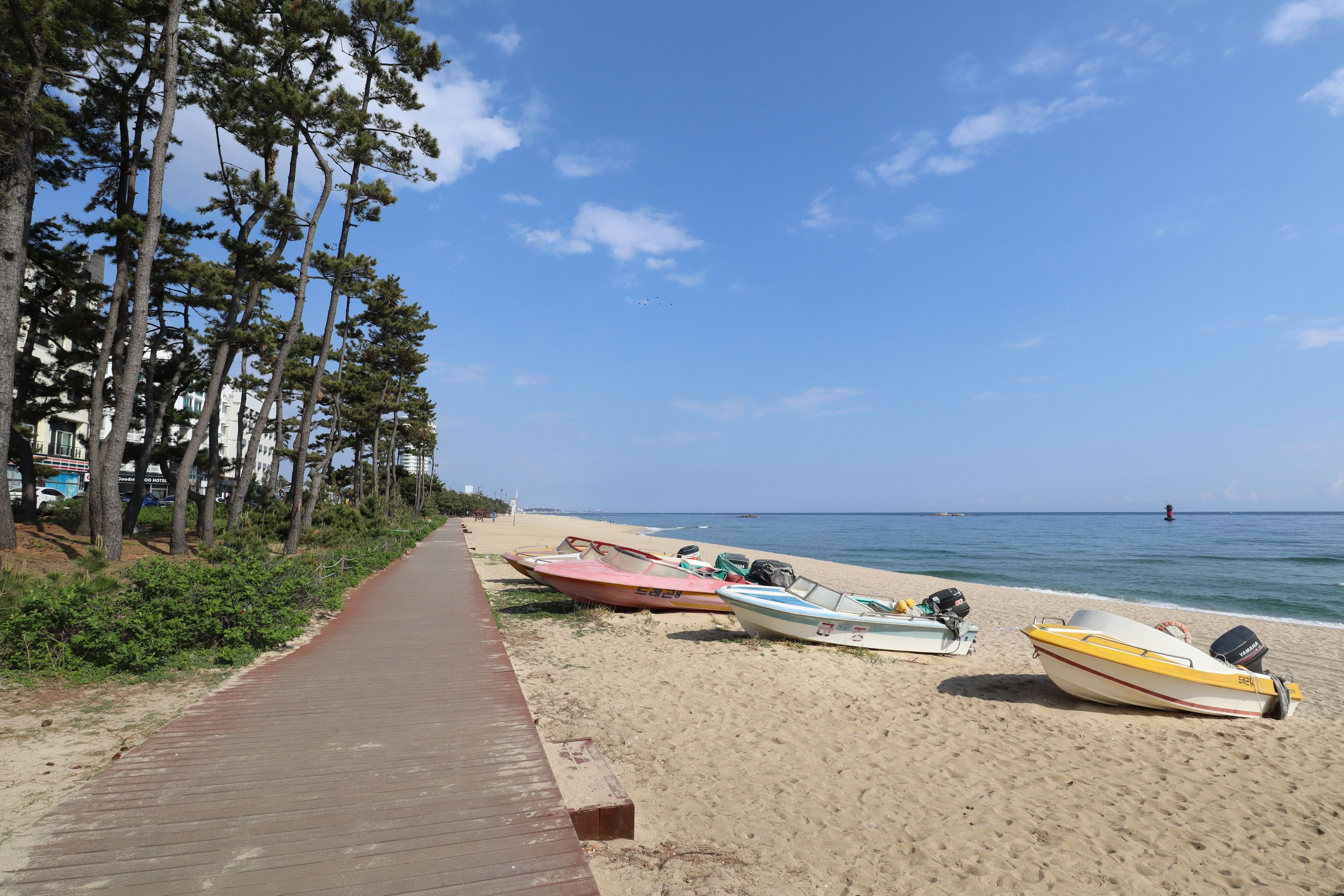
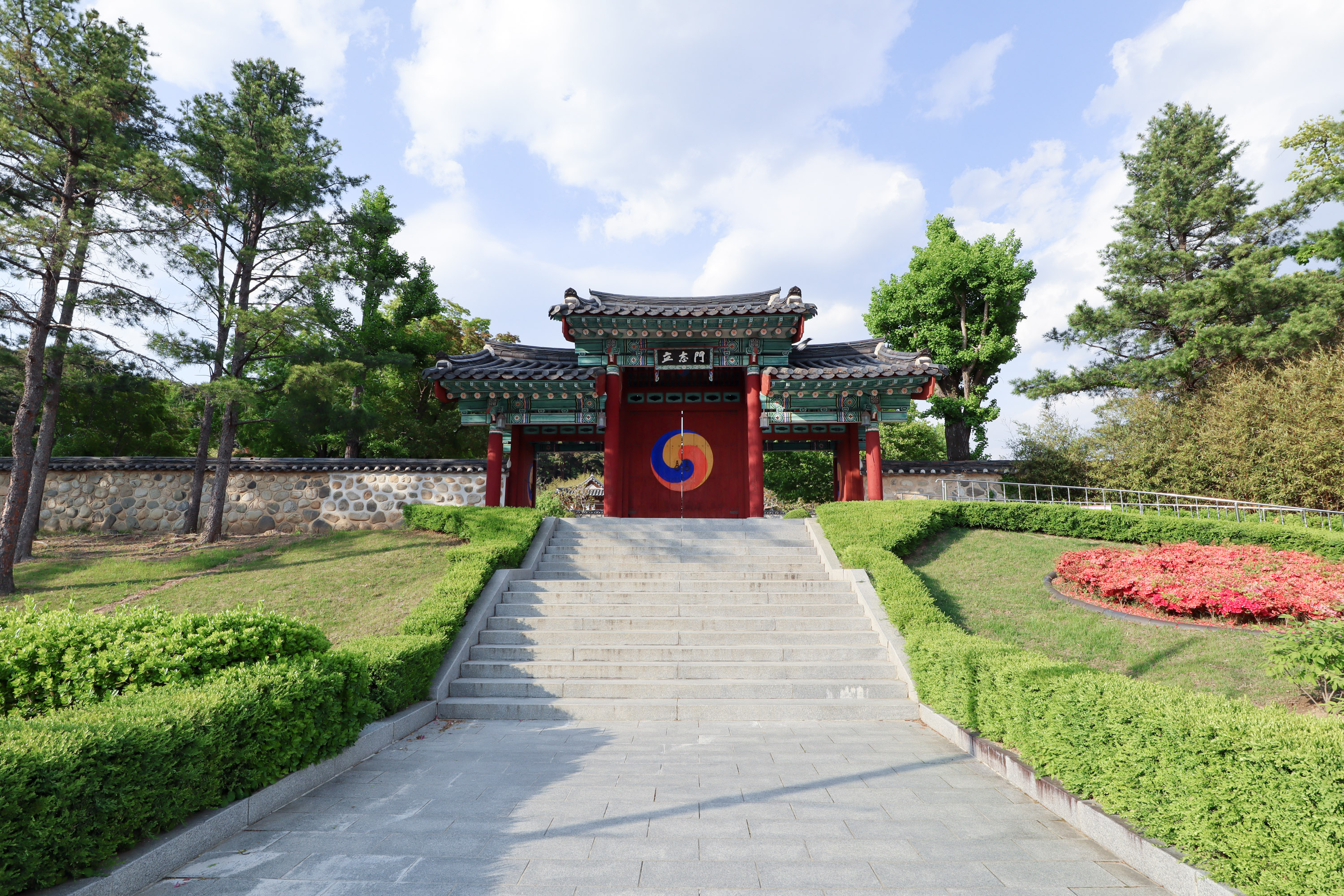
- Jumunjin Lighthouse Namdaecheon Gyeongpo Beach Ojukheon

- Flag Emblem of Gangneung

- Location in South Korea
- Coordinates: 37°45′10″N 128°53′30″E
- Country: South Korea
- State: Gangwon
- First official recorded: 129 BC
- City established: September 1, 1955
- As merger with Myeongju area: January 1, 1995
- Administrative divisions: 1 eup, 7 myeon, 13 dong

Government
  - Mayor: Kim Hong-gyu

Area
  - Total: 1,040 km^{2} (400 sq mi)

Population (September 2024)
  - Total: 208,161
  - Density: 200/km^{2} (518/sq mi)
  - Dialect: Gangwon
- Area code: +82-33
- Climate: Cfa

Korean name
- Hangul: 강릉시
- Hanja: 江陵市
- RR: Gangneung-si
- MR: Kangnŭng-si

Gangneung (Korean: 강릉; Korean pronunciation: [kaŋ.nɯŋ]) is a municipal city in the South Korean state of Gangwon, located on the east coast of South Korea. It has a population of 213,658 (as of 2017). Gangneung is the economic centre of the Yeongdong region of Gangwon State. It has many tourist attractions, such as Jeongdongjin, a very popular area for watching the sunrise, and Gyeongpo Beach. The city hosted all the ice events for the 2018 Winter Olympics and the 2024 Winter Youth Olympics.

== History ==
Gangneung was the home of the Yemaek people in ancient times and became the land of Wiman Joseon in 129 BC. In 128 BC, Nam Ryeo, the army officer of Yaekam, punished Wujang of Wiman Korea and became the territory of the Han dynasty. In the 14th year of Goguryeo Muchheon (313), it entered Goguryeo territory.

In 639, Silla occupied this place and ruled it as a 'Sogyeong' (소경). In 658, King Moo-yeong abolished the Sogyeong and made an arsenal to send the todok, because it was adjacent to Malgal. In 757, it was renamed Sungju and restored it in 776.

It was renamed Myungju again during the Goryeo period, and it was under the jurisdiction the north of Chuncheon in the 14th year of Sungjong (995). It separated the Hamgyeong-do from the Gangeung and called it Gangneung-do, but it has always been the center of administration and military. At the beginning of the Joseon Dynasty, it called to Hwadangdo and Wonchundo and rename Gangneung by the name of Gangwon Province in the 5th year of King Sejong (1423).

Some areas have been incorporated into Yangyang since 1945, and Gangneung City was established in 1995 as the areas of Gangneung and Myeongju merged.

On 18 September 1996 a North Korean submarine ran aground near Gangneung in an attempted infiltration mission, spurring a 49-day manhunt for the escaped passengers. For more details, refer to the 1996 Gangneung submarine infiltration incident.

== Symbols of Gangneung ==
The flag of the city shows a red sun in the centre and blue wave in front, on a white background. The sun represents the sunrise, the wave the sea. The flower of the city is the crepe myrtle, the tree of the city is the pine tree, its bird the swan. The animal of Gangneung is the tiger.

== Geography ==
Gangneung is located to the east of the Taebaek Mountains, which is the considered the 'waist' of the Korean Peninsula. To the east is Sea of Japan, and to the west are the inner side of Hongcheon County, the Pyeongchang County's Jinbu-myeon and the Daegwallyeong-myeon respectively. The southern side is connected to Donghae and the Jeongseon County's critical side. The north side is adjacent to Yangyang County Hyunbuk-myeon and Hyunnam-myeon.

The total area of Gangneung is about 1,040.4 km^{2} (401.7 sq mi) as of the end of 2015, which accounts for 6.2% of Gangwon State's 16,873 km^{2} (6,515 sq mi). 80.4% of the area of Gangneung, 837.36 km^{2} (323.31 sq mi), is forestland.

=== Climate ===
Gangneung experiences a humid subtropical climate (Köppen: Cfa) with cool to cold winters and hot, humid summers. Since Gangneung is a coastal city, it has generally milder winters and relatively cooler summers than the rest of Korea. It is bordered by mountains to the west and the sea to the east.

Climate data for Gangneung (1991–2020 normals, extremes 1911–present)
Month	Jan	Feb	Mar	Apr	May	Jun	Jul	Aug	Sep	Oct	Nov	Dec	Year
Record high °C (°F)	18.7 (65.7)	21.4 (70.5)	27.1 (80.8)	33.6 (92.5)	35.5 (95.9)	37.0 (98.6)	39.4 (102.9)	38.9 (102.0)	35.8 (96.4)	32.8 (91.0)	29.1 (84.4)	21.8 (71.2)	39.4 (102.9)
Mean daily maximum °C (°F)	5.3 (41.5)	7.1 (44.8)	11.7 (53.1)	17.9 (64.2)	22.7 (72.9)	25.4 (77.7)	28.1 (82.6)	28.6 (83.5)	24.6 (76.3)	20.3 (68.5)	14.0 (57.2)	7.7 (45.9)	17.8 (64.0)
Daily mean °C (°F)	0.9 (33.6)	2.7 (36.9)	7.0 (44.6)	13.1 (55.6)	17.9 (64.2)	21.3 (70.3)	24.7 (76.5)	25.0 (77.0)	20.5 (68.9)	15.6 (60.1)	9.5 (49.1)	3.3 (37.9)	13.5 (56.3)
Mean daily minimum °C (°F)	−2.7 (27.1)	−1.3 (29.7)	2.6 (36.7)	8.2 (46.8)	13.3 (55.9)	17.5 (63.5)	21.6 (70.9)	21.9 (71.4)	17.0 (62.6)	11.5 (52.7)	5.6 (42.1)	−0.5 (31.1)	9.6 (49.3)
Record low °C (°F)	−20.2 (−4.4)	−15.9 (3.4)	−11.7 (10.9)	−3.5 (25.7)	−0.8 (30.6)	6.0 (42.8)	11.3 (52.3)	13.7 (56.7)	6.3 (43.3)	−1.9 (28.6)	−9.3 (15.3)	−15.3 (4.5)	−20.2 (−4.4)
Average precipitation mm (inches)	47.9 (1.89)	48.0 (1.89)	65.1 (2.56)	81.9 (3.22)	79.2 (3.12)	118.5 (4.67)	250.2 (9.85)	292.9 (11.53)	229.3 (9.03)	113.9 (4.48)	81.1 (3.19)	36.9 (1.45)	1,444.9 (56.89)
Average precipitation days (≥ 0.1 mm)	6.2	5.7	8.8	8.9	9.1	10.8	16.0	16.4	11.8	7.8	7.3	4.6	113.4
Average snowy days	6.0	6.0	4.3	0.3	0.0	0.0	0.0	0.0	0.0	0.0	0.9	2.9	20.2
Average relative humidity (%)	46.8	49.2	52.8	52.2	59.3	69.3	74.7	76.4	73.0	61.5	52.7	45.6	59.5
Mean monthly sunshine hours	190.2	182.2	199.3	209.6	218.7	176.9	148.9	151.3	162.1	192.5	175.2	189.7	2,196.6
Percentage possible sunshine	60.0	56.7	50.3	51.6	47.5	37.3	30.8	35.1	42.1	54.1	55.9	61.5	47.3
Source: Korea Meteorological Administration (snow and percent sunshine 1981–2010)

== Administrative divisions ==
The district includes one town (eup), seven townships (myeon), 13 neighborhoods (dong).

Name	Korean name	Area(km^{2})	Population	Households	Map
Jumunjin-eup	주문진읍	60.52	19,299	9,098	
Seongsan-myeon	성산면	80.28	3,305	1,488	
Wangsan-myeon	왕산면	245.28	1,682	881	
Gujeong-myeon	구정면	42.72	3,990	1,661	
Gangdong-myeon	강동면	112.48	5,090	2,435	
Okgye-myeon	옥계면	148.83	4,452	2,039	
Sacheon-myeon	사천면	70.89	4,255	1,971	
Yeongok-myeon	연곡면	202.45	6,920	3,090	
Hongjae-dong	홍제동	3.76	8,678	3,601	
Jungang-dong	중앙동	0.99	6,447	3,281	
Okcheon-dong	옥천동	0.58	4,246	2,162	
Gyo 1-dong	교1동	2.73	29,995	11,122	
Gyo 2-dong	교2동	2.57	9,723	4,078	
Ponam 1-dong	포남1동	1.3	12,057	5,213	
Ponam 2-dong	포남2동	2.58	16,694	6,727	
Chodang-dong	초당동	2.89	5,921	2,413	
Songjeong-dong	송정동	3.45	7,561	2,838	
Naegok-dong	내곡동	4.96	11,970	5,066	
Gangnam-dong	강남동	16.09	21,515	8,450	
Seongdeok-dong	성덕동	11.41	29,357	11,043	
Gyeongpo-dong	경포동	23.02	4,829	2,234	
Gangneung-si	강릉시	1,040	217,986	90,891	

== Nature and tourism ==
=== Beaches ===
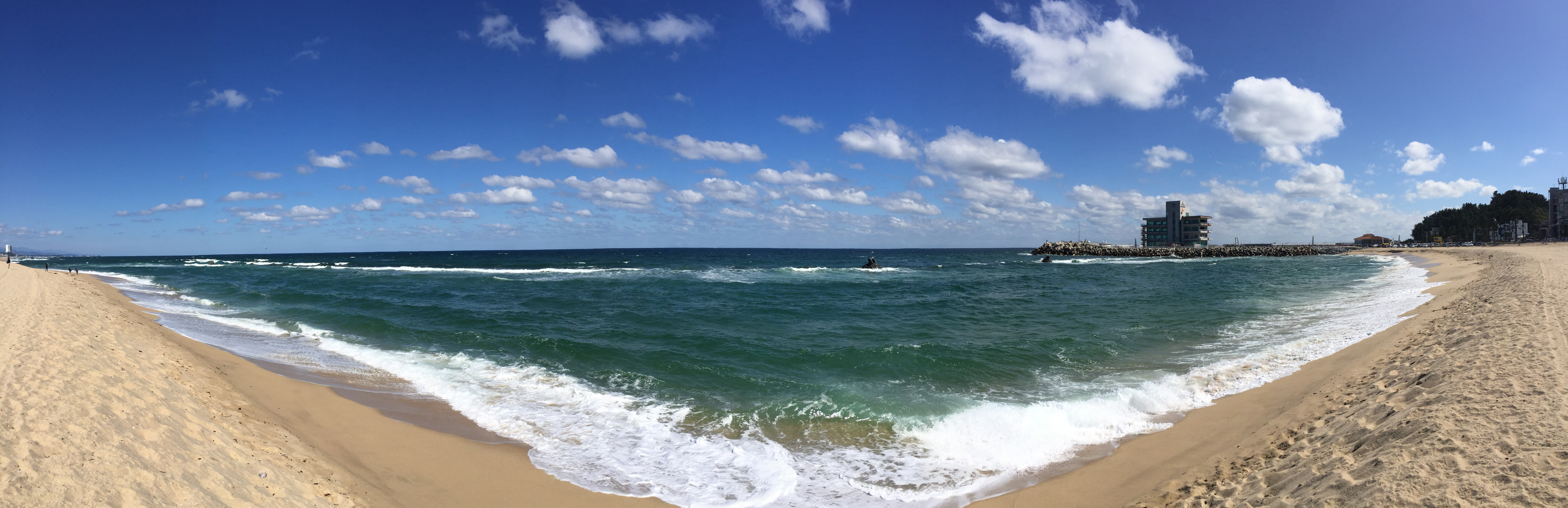
Anmok Beach

There are 20 beaches such as Anmok Beach, Gyeongpo Beach and Gangmun Beach. Jeongdongjin Beach is a popular place to visit in the New Year because the first sunrise is important in Korean culture. The TV series Sandglass was taken on the beach.

Jeongdong-Simgok Badabuchae Trail is a 2.86 km trail where visitors can observe the coastal terrace formed 23 million years ago.

=== Gyeongpo Lake ===
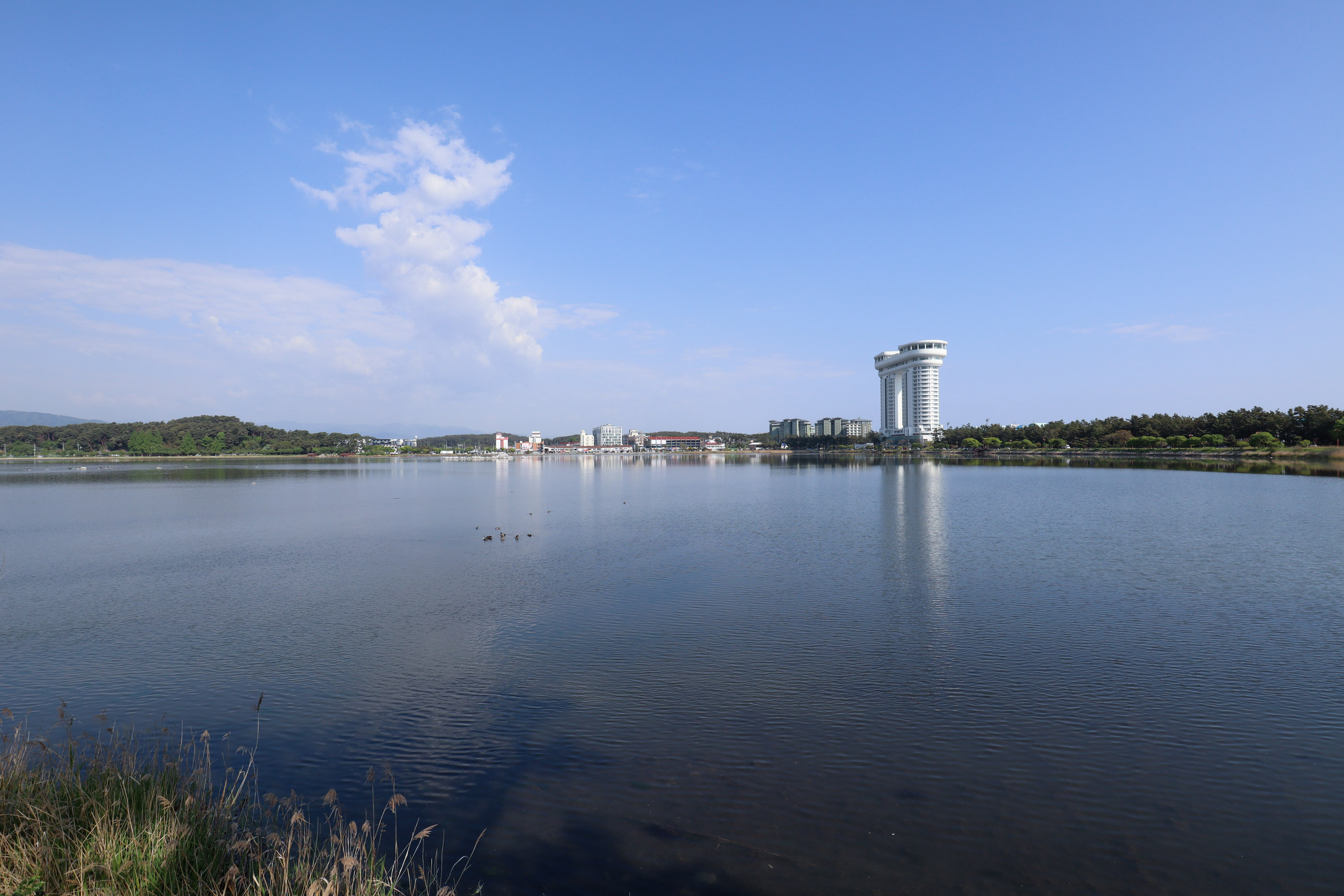
Gyeongpo Lake

Gyeongpo Lake is the second largest lagoon in the east coast. Its size has shrunk due to continuous development since the early 20th century. It is a habitat for ducks, cormorants and egrets and migratory birds such as swans are also spotted here.

== Culture ==
=== Heritage ===
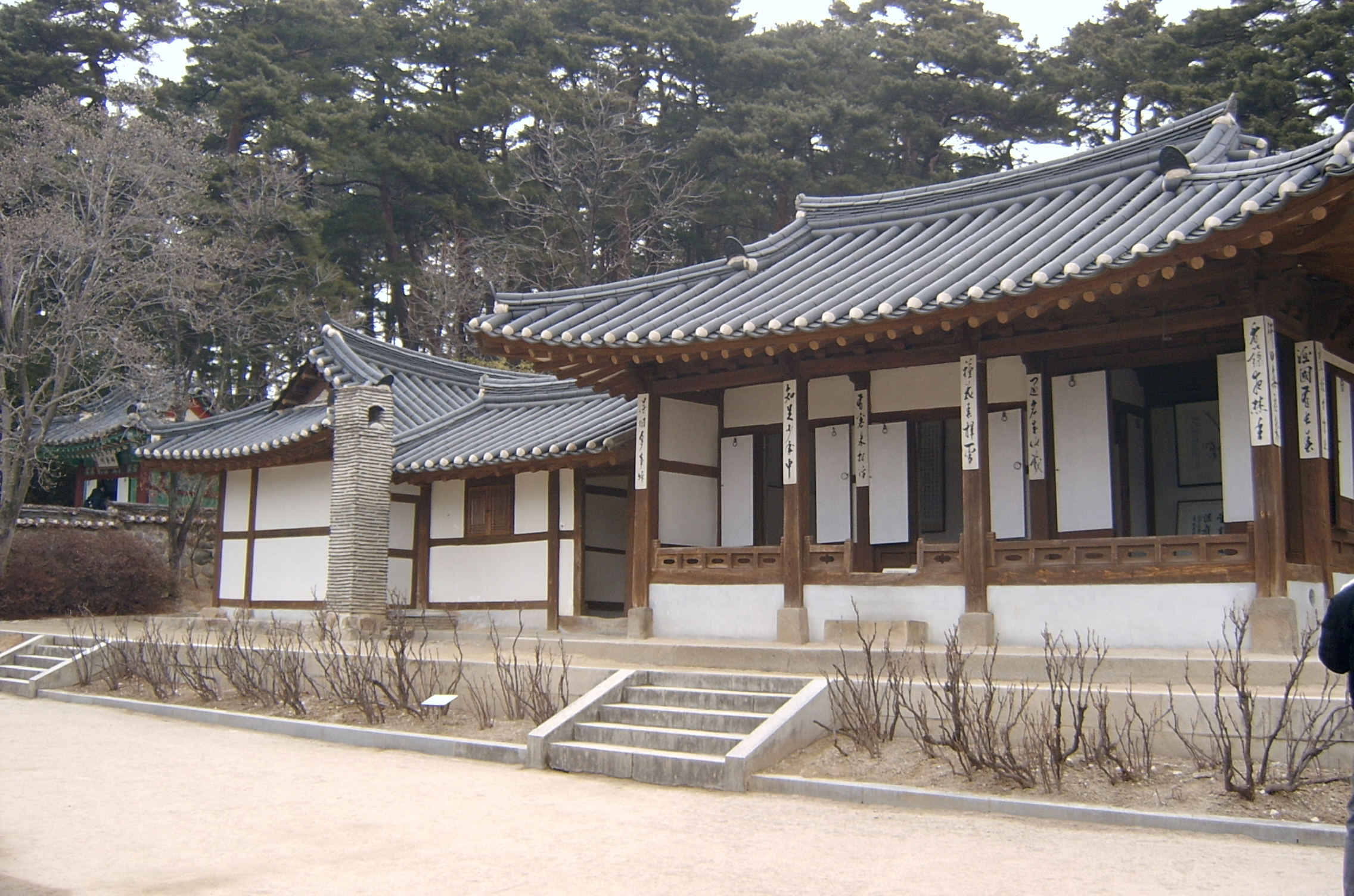
Ojukheon

There are a total of 136 cultural properties in Gangneung. Among them, there are 40 state-designated heritages and 60 province-designated heritages.

- Main Gate of Imyeonggwan is the front gate of an official inn built in the Goryeo period. It is the only national treasure in Gangneung.
- Ojukheon is the birthplace of Shin Saimdang and Yi I. It was designated as treasure No. 165 because it is one of the oldest buildings in Korea.
- Gyeongpodae is a pavilion located north of Gyeongpo lake. Built in the Goryeo dynasty, it was designated as treasure No. 2046.
- Gulsansa was founded by Beomil in 851. The site of the temple was designated as historic site No. 448.
- Imdangdong Catholic Church, which was constructed in 1955, was designated as registered cultural heritage No. 457.

Total	State-designated heritage									Province-designated heritage					Cultural heritage material
Total	Total	National Treasure	Treasure	Historic Site	Natural monuments	Intangible Cultural Property	Scenic Site	National Folklore Cultural Heritage	Registered cultural heritage	Total	Tangible Cultural Heritage	Intangible Cultural Heritage	Monument	Registered cultural heritage	Cultural heritage material
136	40	1	21	3	6	1	4	2	2	60	40	6	13	1	36

=== Festivals ===
Gangneung Danoje is the oldest festival in South Korea and the biggest in the east coast. It was designated as the National Intangible Cultural Heritage in 1967 and Masterpieces of the Oral and Intangible Heritage of Humanity by UNESCO in 2005. It is a combination of several commemoration rites and traditional plays, with the highlight being the traditional Gwanno Mask Dance.

There are several modern festivals in the region. The International Junior Art Festival, which began in 2002, showcases performances of international youth and provides a program on Korean culture. Gyeongpo Rock Festival offers indie bands a stage for their performances. Gangneung Coffee Festival, which began in 2009, is an annual coffee-tasting festival in which a variety of coffee vendors showcase their drinks.

=== Food ===
Gangneung is famous for Chodang dubu, ongsimi, mulhoe, jangkalguksu, tea ceremony and hangwa. Chodang dubu, local food of Chodang village, uses seawater instead of bittern.

Anmok Coffee Street, which started to form in the 1990s, is where Gangneung Coffee Festival is held. Park I-choo, CEO of Bohemian Park I-Choo Coffee, is thought to have contributed greatly to the formation of the street.

=== Museums ===
There are 10 museums in Gangneung. Gangneung City Museum exhibits relics that show the history and culture of Gangneung. Daegwallyeong Museum exhibits traditional art. Hwanhui Cup Museum (Fantapia M) is South Korea's first cup museum.

== Transportation ==
In Gangneung, Donghae Expressway connects Incheon to Gangneung and Yeongdong Expressway connects Yangyang County and Donghae. The national highway is National Route 7 (part of Asian Highway Route 6) and it connects Goseong County to Busan. It takes about 2 hours and 30 minutes to Seoul by road.

The Yeongdong Line passes Yeongju to Gangneung. Before 2006, Saemaeul-ho stopped at Jeongdongjin station and Gangneung station and it took 5.5 hours at Cheongnyangni station, but now only Mugunghwa-ho is stopped, it takes 6 hours to drive. In 2017, Gyeonggang Line was opened and Gangneung station was designated as an essential-stop station. The time between Gangneung station and Cheongnyangni station has been reduced from the existing 6 hours to the minimum of 114 minutes after KTX operation.

It was operated by Gangneung Airport for air traffic, but passed the passenger transportation right to Yangyang International Airport in 2002 and closed its service as an airport.

=== Roads ===
Yeongdong Expressway passed city west to east, Donghae Expressway passed through the city from south to north. National Route 6, 7, 35, 59 passed through city.

=== Trains ===
KTX-Sancheon is essential stop Jinbu and Gangneung station. On 2018 Winter Olympics period, increased frequency of KTX.

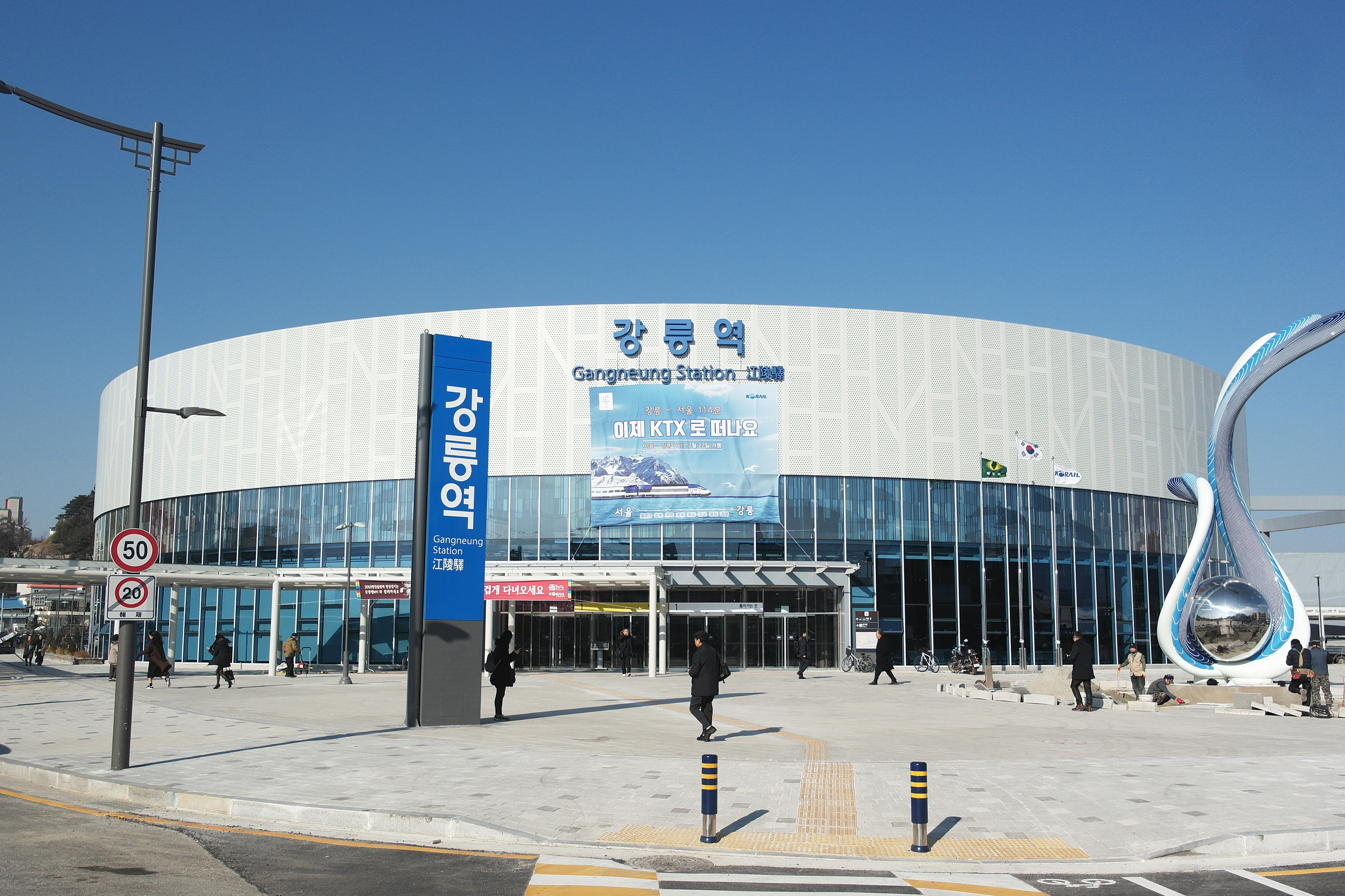
Gangneung station

Train
Yeongdong Line	Mangsang ↔ Okkye ↔ Jeongdongjin ↔ Anin↔ Gangneung
Gyeonggang Line	Jinbu ↔ Gangneung

=== Buses ===
Local transit operators connect communities in the city divided three regions. This is managed by Gangneung City Office and the operation is carried out by each transportation company.

Gangneung Intercity Bus Terminal operates the intercity bus and operates six Express Bus line in the Gangneung Express Bus Terminal, the largest terminal in Gangwon State.

=== Taxi ===
A total of 589 units in Gangneung are operating taxi licenses. The basic fare of Gangneung taxi is 2,800 won for 2 km. After that, 100 won will be charged for 152m from 2 km to 6 km, and 200 won will be charged for 152m after 6 km. but Jumunjin area, Gangdong-meon, Okgye area are designated as exceptional areas to 45% extra charge.

=== Sea transport ===
Gangneung Port Passenger Terminal of Gangneung Harbor handles the Gangneung-Ulneung passenger ship.

== Sports ==
=== Football ===
Gangneung is the home of the K3 League football club FC Gangneung and is one of the two cities where K League football team Gangwon FC plays its home matches. Since 1976, Gangneung Jeil High School and Gangneung Junior high school soccer team rivalry Derby, which is held every day in the Dano Festival, have become popular.

The Daemyung Killer Whales were active in Asia League Ice Hockey from 2016 to 2020.

=== 2018 Winter Olympics ===
The city 'Gangneung Coastal Cluster' was the venue for the indoor sports of the 2018 Winter Olympics and Paralympics in Pyeongchang. All these facilities, except for the Gangneung Curling Centre, were built for the Olympics.

- Gangneung Olympic Park
  - Gangneung Hockey Centre – Ice Hockey (Olympics and Paralympics)
  - Gangneung Curling Centre – Curling (Olympics and Paralympics)
  - Gangneung Oval – Speed skating
  - Gangneung Ice Arena – Short track speed skating and Figure skating
- Kwandong Hockey Centre - Ice Hockey (Olympics)

The city also hosted an Olympic Village for the athletes and a media village.

== Image gallery ==
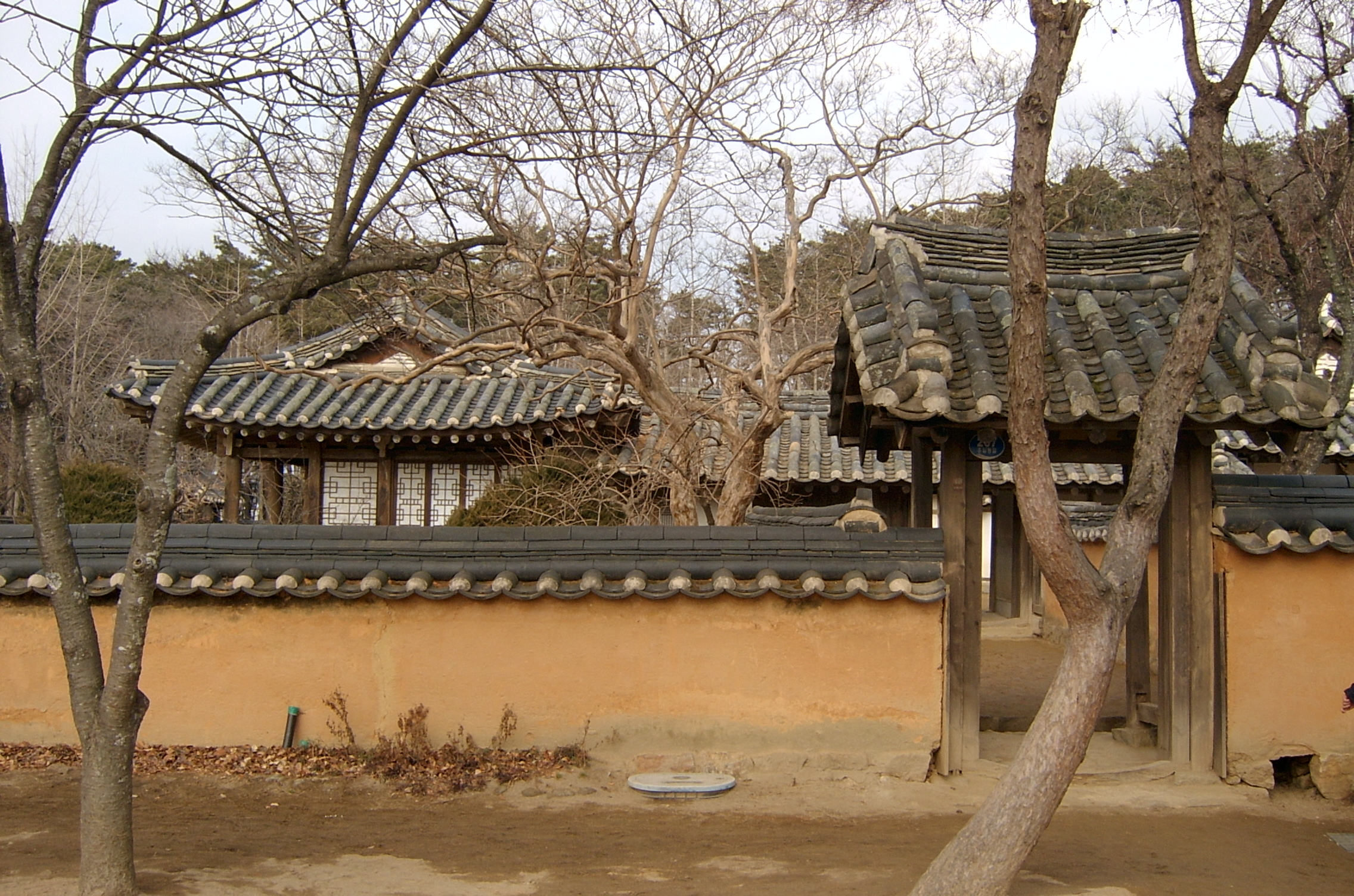
The birth house of Heo Nanseolheon, a famous Korean poet of the 17th century.

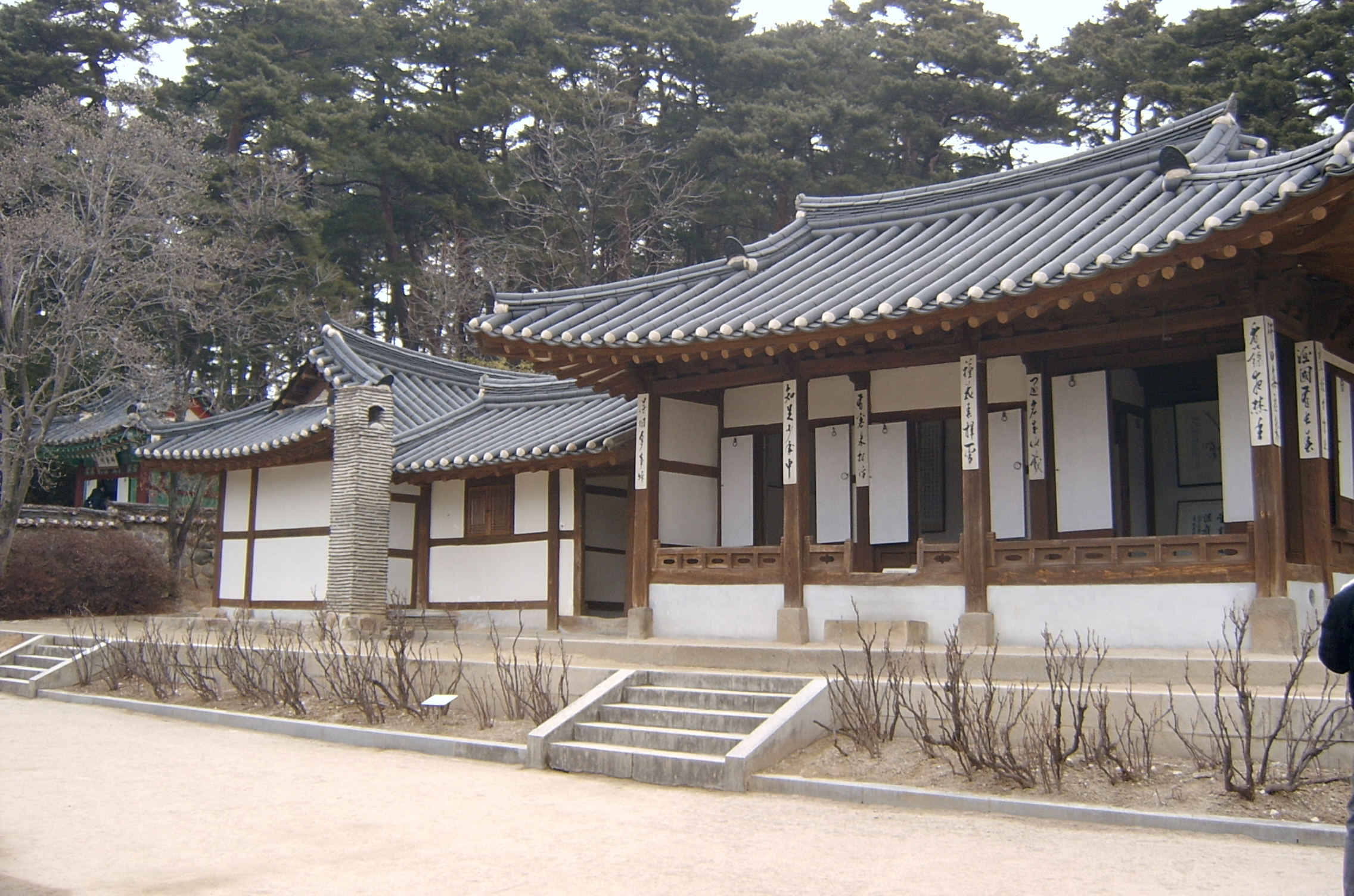
The birthplace of Yi I.

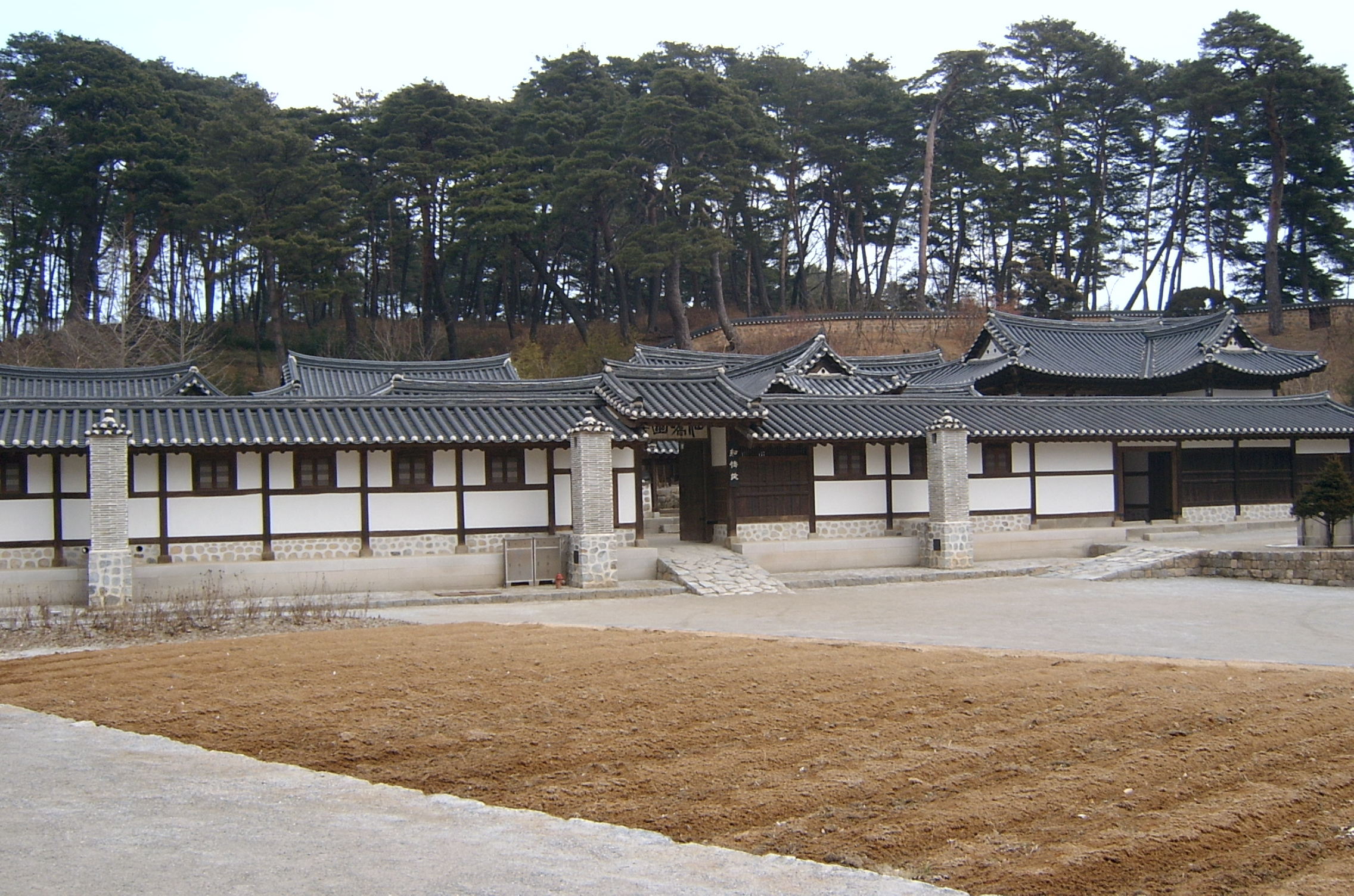
Seongyojang, a country house built and owned by a prominent yangban family in Gangneung. Built in the 19th century.

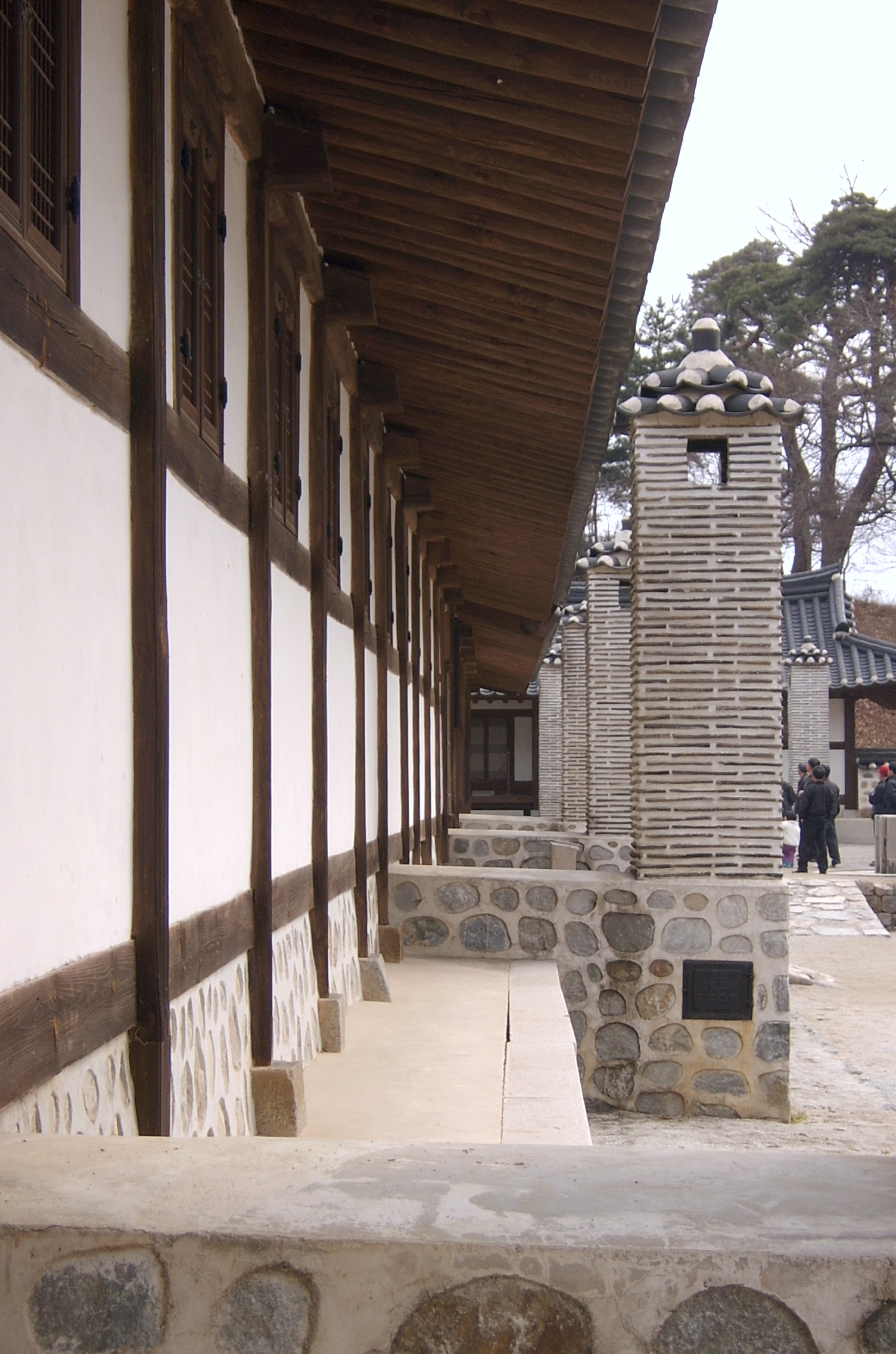
A closer view at Seongyojang.

== Sister cities ==
- Chichibu, Saitama, Japan, since February 16, 1983
- Öskemen, East Kazakhstan, Kazakhstan, since 2011
- Mangshi, Yunnan, China, since November 21, 2012
- Indang, Cavite, Philippines, since 2013
- Loudoun County, United States, Friendship City since 2014
- Algemesí, Spain, since 2015

== Notable people ==
- Choi Kyu-Ha, former president of South Korea
- Edward Young-min Kwon, celebrity chef
- Yeon Woo-jin, actor
- JR (NU'EST), idol
- Yezi (Fiestar), idol
- Kim Seo-hyung, actress
- Jeon Yeo-bin, actress
- Sin Saimdang, a Korean artist, writer, calligraphist, and poet.
- Kim Bo-sung, a South Korean actor
- Yi I, a Korean philosopher and writer
- Choi Han-bit, model, actress, singer and idol
- Cha Hyung-won, living national treasure
- from20, singer-songwriter

== See also ==
- 1996 Gangneung submarine infiltration incident
- List of cities in South Korea
