= Bohemian Park I-Choo Coffee =

Café in Gangneung, South Korea

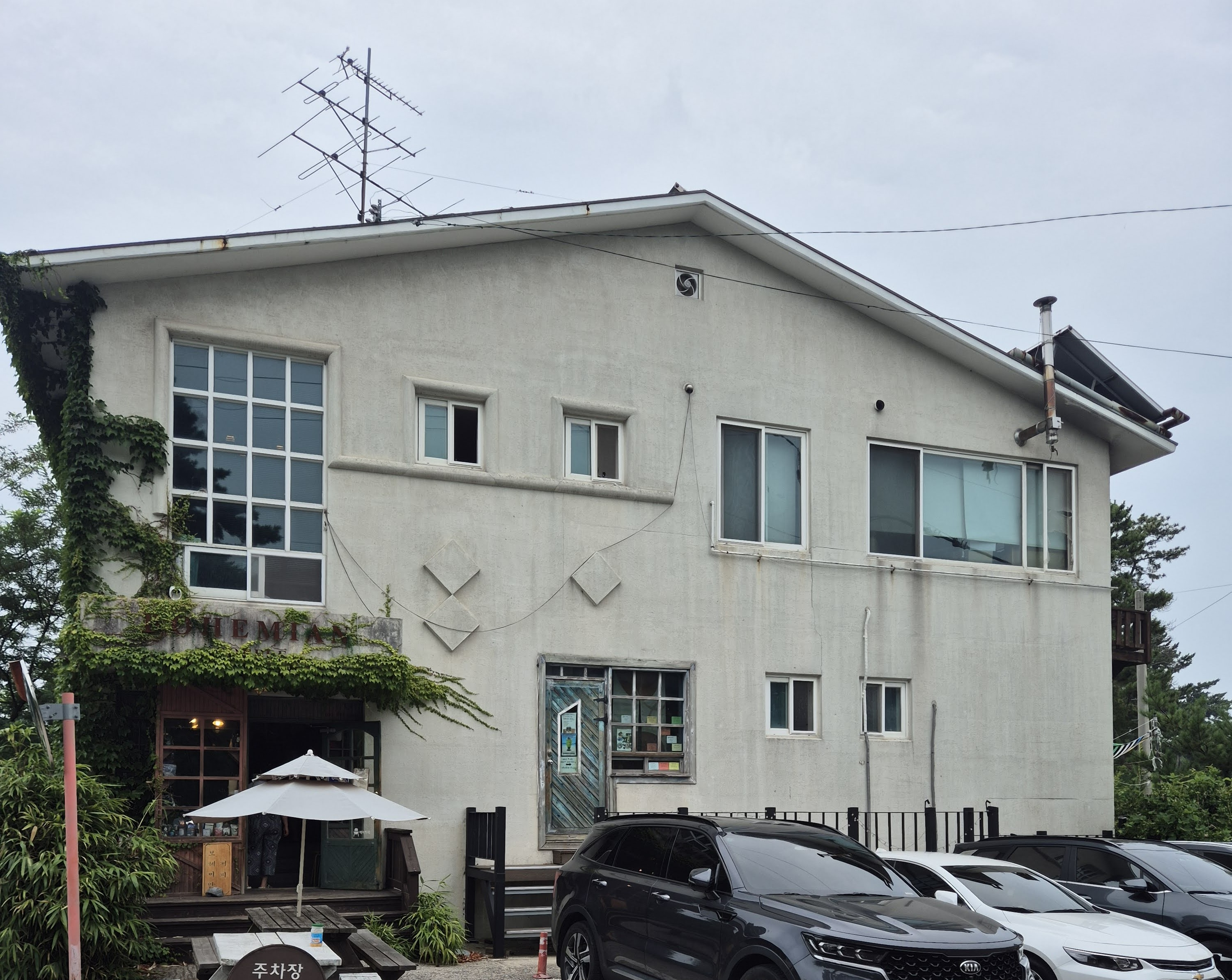
- Storefront (2025)

Restaurant information
- Established: 1988
- Food type: Coffee
- Location: Gangneung, South Korea

Bohemian Park I-Choo Coffee (Korean: 보헤미안박이추커피) is a cafe in Gangneung, Gangwon Province, South Korea. It first opened in Seoul in 1988 by Park I-choo. Park is thought to have contributed greatly to popularizing drip coffee in South Korea and forming Gangneung Coffee Street.

Characterized by strong roasting of coffee beans, its representative menu is "hand drip coffee", a blend of four types of coffee beans.

== History ==
Park I-choo is a second generation Zainichi Korean born in 1950 in Kyushu. He went to South Korea in 1974 and ran a ranch in Pocheon and Wonju. However, he gave up his farm due to land ownership issues and returned to Japan. After learning coffee techniques in Japan, he opened Gabae Bohemian (가배 보헤미안) in Hyehwa-dong in 1988. Due to frequent protests, he moved to Anam-dong in 1990. He got tired of the crowds and moved again to Pyeongchang in 2000 and to Gangneung in 2004.

In 2022, it was designated as a baengnyeongage by the Ministry of SMEs and Startups.
