= Mukho station =

Train station in South Korea

묵호
Mukho
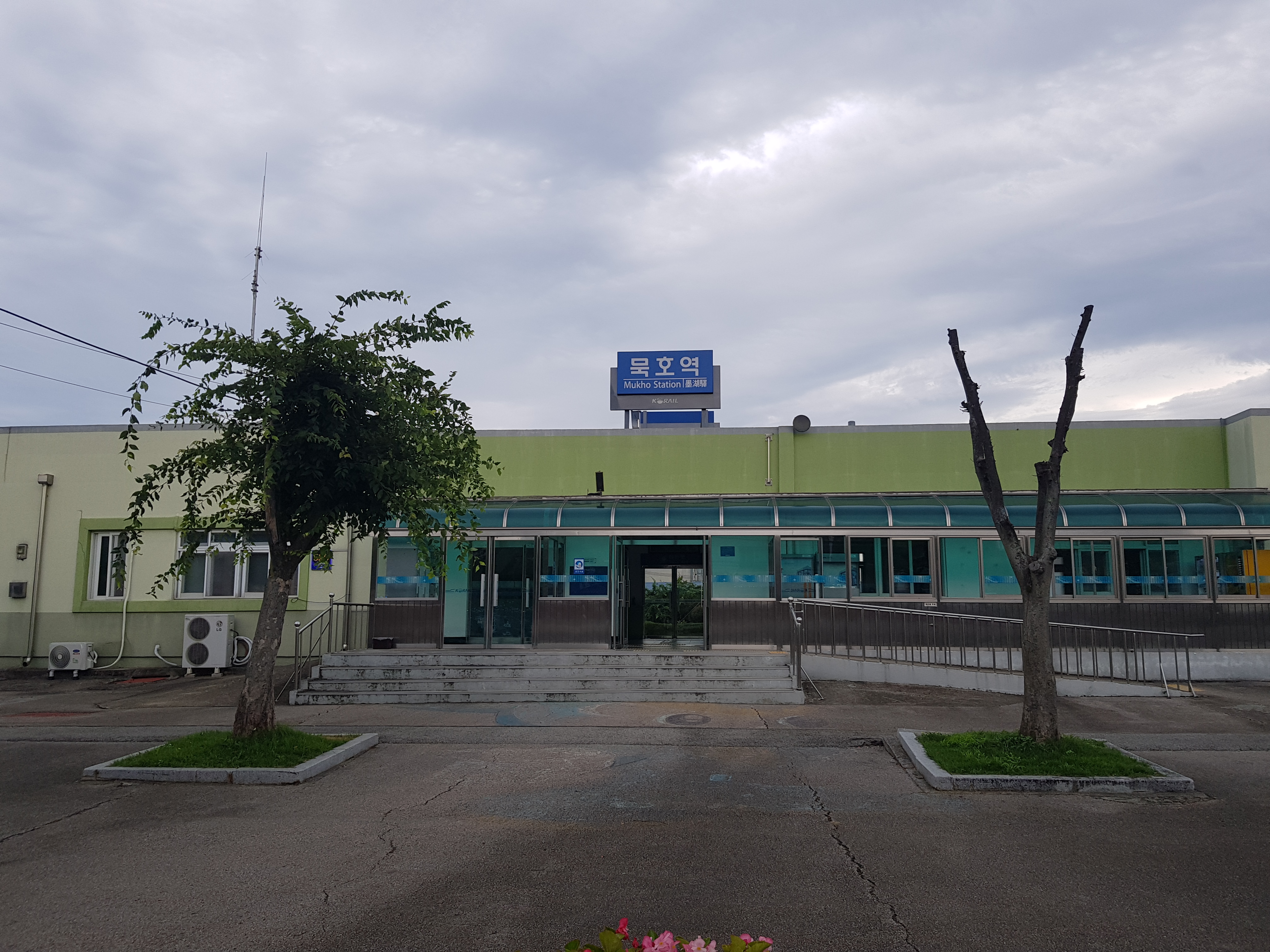

Korean name
- Hangul: 묵호역
- Hanja: 墨湖驛
- Revised Romanization: Mukhoyeok
- McCune–Reischauer: Mukhoyŏk

General information
- Location: Donghae, Gangwon; South Korea
- Coordinates: 37.546056°N 129.108231°E
- Operator: Korail
- Lines: Yeongdong Line; Mukhohang Line
- Platforms: 1
- Tracks: 2

Construction
- Structure type: Aboveground

History
- Opened: May 5, 1961
Location

Mukho station is a railway station in Donghae City in Gangwon Province, South Korea. Mukho station is on the Yeongdong Line, and the Mukhohang Line.
