= Jeongdongjin =

Town in South Korea

Coordinates: 37.691907°N 129.032685°E

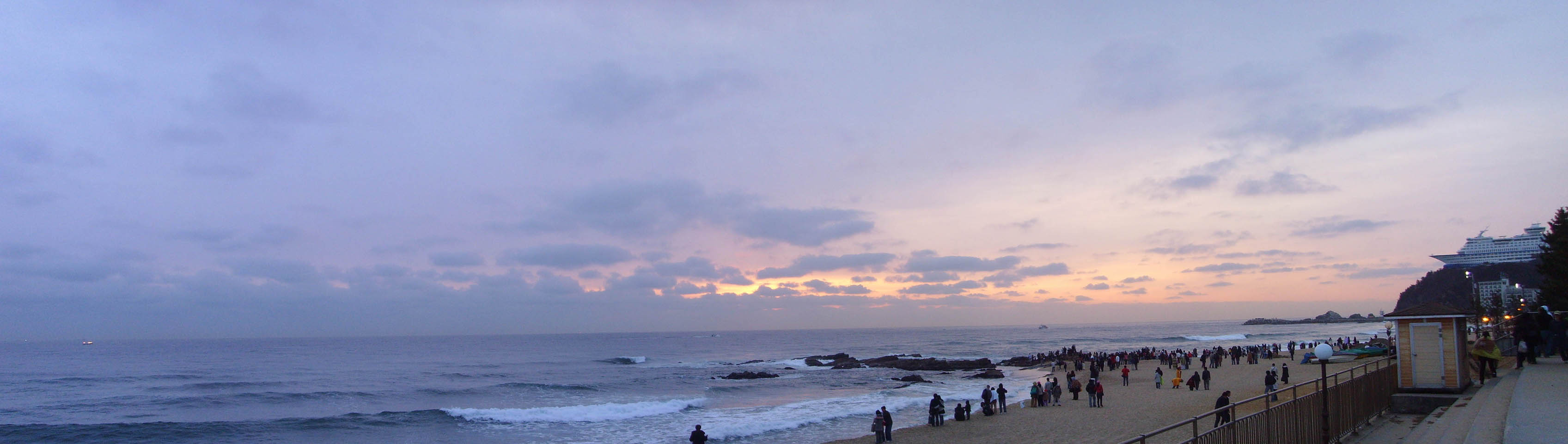
Jeongdongjin Beach

Jeongdongjin (also Chongdongjin) is a town near Gangneung, South Korea, and one of the most popular sites in Korea for watching the sunrise on New Year's Day. It is eighteen kilometers south-east of Gangneung on the east coast of Korea along the Sea of Japan.

== See also ==
- Jeongdongjin station
- Sea Train
- Korean New Year
