= Yeongdong Line =

Railway line in South Korea

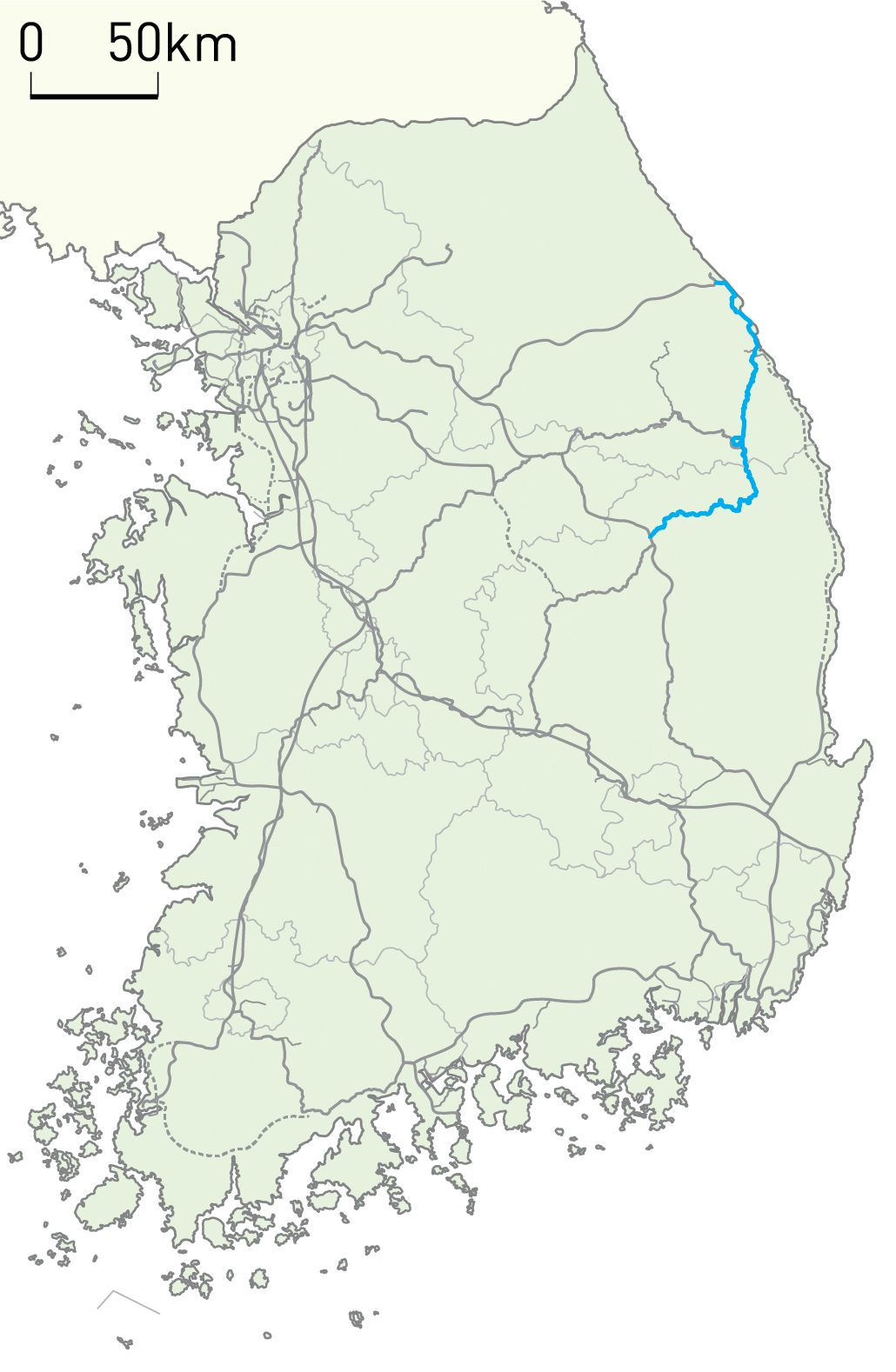

Overview
- Native name: 영동선(嶺東線)
- Status: Operational
- Owner: Korea Rail Network Authority
- Locale: North Gyeongsang; Gangwon (South Korea)
- Termini: Yeongju; Gangneung
- Stations: 37

Service
- Type: Heavy rail, Passenger/Freight; Regional rail
- Operator(s): Korail

History
- Opened: Stages between 1940-1962
- Closed: 1 March 1979 (Gangneung – Gyeongpodae)

Technical
- Line length: 192.7 km (119.7 mi)
- Number of tracks: Single track
- Track gauge: 1,435 mm (4 ft 8 1/2 in) standard gauge
- Electrification: 25 kV/60 Hz AC Overhead line

- Yeongdong Line
- Hangul: 영동선
- Hanja: 嶺東線
- RR: Yeongdongseon
- MR: Yŏngdongsŏn

The Yeongdong Line is a line of Korail. It connects Yeongju in North Gyeongsang Province with Gangneung in Gangwon Province. From Yeongju, it crosses the Taebaek Mountains and reaches the Sea of Japan (East Sea) at Donghae, thence proceeding north to Gangneung.

At Yeongju, the line connects with the Gyeongbuk and Jungang Lines. Some trains travel directly from one to the other, so that it is possible to travel directly from Seoul or Busan to Gangneung by rail.

== History ==
=== Construction ===
The first 41.4 km (25.7 mi) section of the line (Mukho Port–Dogye) was opened by the privately owned Samcheok Railway on 31 July 1940. The line was named Cheoram Line, which ran from Mukho, a port on Korea's east coast that became part of Donghae in 1980, to Cheoram in the Taebaek Mountains, to develop three coal fields. Between Simpo-ri and Tong-ri stations, the great height difference was scaled by a steep double-track railway. Freight railcars going up and down were connected to the same cable, passengers had to walk up the mountain. A 12.9 km (8.0 mi) branch from Bukpyeong station (today Donghae station) to Samcheok, the Samcheok Line, was opened on 11 February 11.

Another section of the future Yeongdong Line was first projected as a branch line from Yeongju to Chunyang for the exploitation of the forest areas and mines in the area, the Yeongchun Line. Permission to build the line was given to the privately owned Chosen Railway on 16 October 1944, and work began that year with local forced labourers. Although the first section from Yeongju to Naeseong (today Bonghwa) was almost complete by August 1945, that month World War II ended, a Korean provisional government formed, and a flood damaged the tracks, leading to the abandonment of the line. After the nationalisation of the line work resumed in 1949, when the Economic Cooperation Administration, the United States government agency administering the Marshall Plan, also launched a plan to revive South Korea's economy, which included the construction of new railway lines. One new line under the plan was the 86.4 km (53.7 mi) long Yeongam Line from Yeongju to Cheoram, which included and extended the Yeongchun Line alignment planned by the Chosen Railway to link up the Cheoram Line with the rest of the network. The reconstructed 14.1 km (8.8 mi) from Yeongju to Naeseong opened in March 1950. Construction was interrupted again because of the Korean War in 1950. After the end of the war work was resumed in 1953, and the last section finally opened in 1955. The scenic Yeongam Line included 55 bridges and 33 tunnels:

Date	Section	Length
1 February 1950	Yeongju – Naeseong (Bonghwa)	14.1 km
1 February 1955	Naeseong – Bongseong	12.0 km
1 July 1955	Bongseong – Chunyang	12.2 km
31 December 1955	Chunyang – Cheoram	49.2 km

Following the 1961 coup, the Supreme Council for National Reconstruction started South Korea's first five-year plan, which included a construction program to complete the railway network, to foster economic growth. The Gangwon Bukbu Line, a railway along the eastern coast from Mukho to Gyeongpo-dong in Gangneung, the endpoint of a narrow-gauge railway to Sokcho, was opened until 1962 as follows:

Date	Section	Length
5 May 1961	Bukpyeong (Donghae) – Okkye	18.2 km
6 November 1962	Okkye – Gyeongpodae	33.1 km

This line was also called the Donghae Bukbu Line with view to a planned connection with the existing line by the same name further north. On May 17, 1963, the Yeongam, Cheoram and Gangwon Bukbu Lines were integrated into a single line from Yeongju to Gangneung under the present name as the Yeongdong Line. Meanwhile, from August 1961, the 8.5 km (5.3 mi) Hwangji switchback section was built to bypass the cable-hauled section between Simpo-ri and Tong-ri stations, which opened on May 30, 1963.

A number of branches were built from the line, among them the 9.0 km (5.6 mi) long Hwangji Branchline from Baeksan to Hwangji (today Taebaek), which opened on December 20, 1962, and was integrated into the Taebaek Line in 1973.

After the closure of the Gangneung–Gyeongpo-dong section on March 1, 1979, the total length of the line reduced from 200 km (124.3 mi) to 193.6 km (120.3 mi).

=== Upgrade ===
Electrification reached the line from the Taebaek Line, when the catenary on the 85.5 km long section from Gohan on the Taebaek Line via junction station Baeksan to Donghae went into service on December 5, 1975. On March 28, 1997, the 87.0 km long section from the junction to Yeongju followed, and electrification was completed with the 45.1 km long Donghae–Gangneung section on September 8, 2005.

The steep descent from Dongbaeksan to Dogye contains switchbacks, which hinder smooth traffic. In addition, a 1996 investigation found that the section is endangered by soil subsistence and the ageing of tunnels. To solve these problems, Korail built a 19.6 km (12.2 mi) new alignment between the two stations with a budget of 510.322 billion won. The main part of the section is the 16,240 m (53,281 ft) Solan Tunnel, which includes a spiral. The tunnel was opened on 27 June 2012.

At the time of thawing relations between South and North Korea, when the cross-border section of the Donghae Bukbu Line was reopened in 2007, the South Korean government considered the construction of a railway for freight traffic all along the east coast to the North Korean border. This line would incorporate the Donghae–Gangneung section of the Yeongdong Line and the Samcheok branch, and connect to newly built lines at Samcheok and Gangneung. Three years later, the project re-surfaced as a domestic project. On September 1, 2010, the South Korean government announced a strategic plan to reduce travel times from Seoul to 95% of the country to under 2 hours by 2020. Under the plan, the east coast line, including the section of the Yeongdong Line from Donghae to Gangneung and the Samcheok Line, would be upgraded for 230 km/h (143 mph), and may see KTX service.

== Operation ==
In passenger traffic, the Yeongdong Line is served by Mugunghwa-ho cross-country trains. In the timetable valid from December 15, 2010, three pairs of daily trains run along the entire length of the line, reinforced by a seventh pair on Saturdays and Sundays, with Yeongju–Gangneung travel times between 3 hours 42 minutes and 3 hours 56 minutes, depending on the number of stops. Two pairs of the daily trains connect Gangneung and Dongdaegu Station in Daegu, traversing the Daegu Line and part of the Jungang Line to connect to the Yeongdong Line, with Dongdaegu–Gangneung travel times between 6 hours 16 minutes and 6 hours 39 minutes. The third pair of daily trains runs between Gangneung and Bujeon station in Busan, also traversing parts of the Jungang and Donghae Nambu Lines, with Bujeon–Gangneung travel times of 8 hours 24 minutes toward Gangneung and 8 hours 34 minutes in the opposite direction. The pair of weekend trains runs between Gangneung and Busan station, also traversing the Gyeongbuk Line and the Gimcheon–Busan section of the Gyeongbu Line, with Busan–Gangneung travel times of 8 hours 25 minutes toward Gangneung and 8 hours 30 minutes in the opposite direction. A further pair of daily trains runs only between Yeongju and Donghae.

The Dongbaeksan–Gangneung section of the Yeongdong Line sees more frequent passenger traffic, with Mugunghwa trains from the capital Seoul reaching the line via the connecting Taebaek Line. In the timetable valid from December 15, 2010, six pairs of daily trains run between Cheongnyangni station in Seoul and Gangneung, reinforced by a seventh pair on Fridays to Sundays, with Cheongnyangni–Gangneung travel times between 5 hours 47 minutes and 6 hours 25 minutes, depending on the number of stops.

In 1998, Korean National Railroad (today Korail) introduced special tourist trains operating in the winter months, identified by a snowflake decoration, which enjoyed great popularity. Most of these trains also traverse parts of the Yeongdong Line. By the 2009/2010 season, the offer expanded to a dozen different tour packages, including trips to single destinations combined with local excursions, as well as round trips in the Taebaek Mountains along the Jungang, Taebaek and Yeongdong Lines.

According to Korail's plans in 2009, travel times on the Yeongdong Line are to be reduced after 2013 with the future series version of the Tilting Train Express.

== Major stations ==
- Yeongju station, Yeongju, Gyeongsangbuk-do, the junction with the Jungang Line and the terminus of the Gyeongbuk Line
- Bonghwa station, Bonghwa, Gyeongsangbuk-do
- Chunyang station, Bonghwa, Gyeongsangbuk-do
- Seokpo station, Bonghwa, Gyeongsangbuk-do
- Cheoram station, Taebaek, Gangwon-do
- Dongbaeksan station, Taebaek, Gangwon-do, the terminus of the Taebaek Line
- Tong-ri station, Taebaek, Gangwon-do
- Dogye station, Samcheok, Gangwon-do
- Singi station, Samcheok, Gangwon-do
- Donghae station, Donghae, Gangwon-do, terminus a branch to Samcheok
- Mukho station, Donghae, Gangwon-do
- Jeongdongjin station, Gangneung, Gangwon-do
- Gangneung station, Gangneung, Gangwon-do, the planned terminus of the rebuilt Donghae Bukbu Line

=== Famous stations ===
- Sandglass (drama) was shot at Jeongdongjin station.
- I Really Really Like You! (drama) was shot at Gosa-ri station.
- The Vineyard Man (drama) starring Yoon Eun Hye was shot at Simcheon station.

== See also ==
- Transportation in South Korea
