= Donghae station =

Train station in South Korea

동해
Donghae
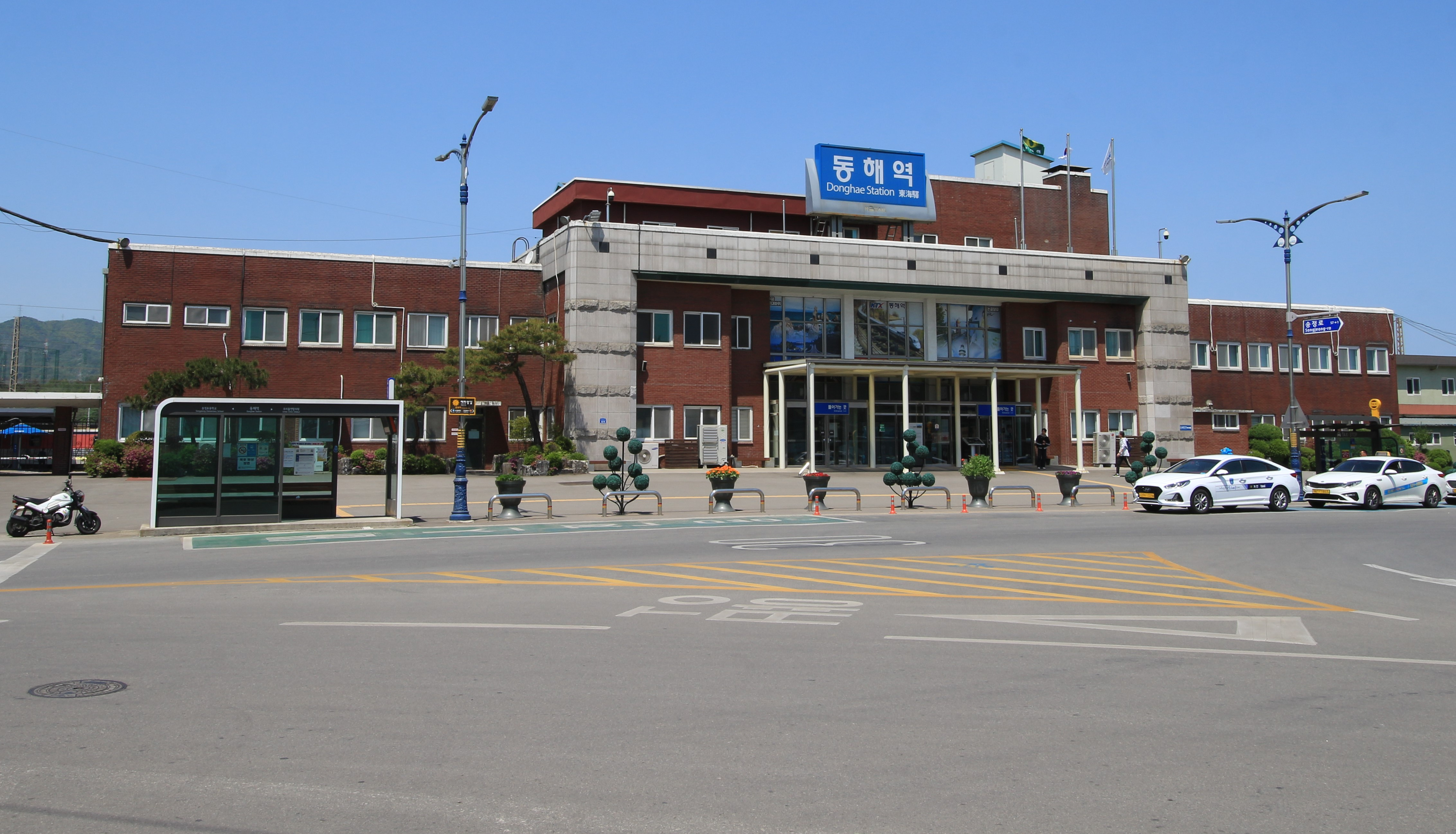

Korean name
- Hangul: 동해역
- Hanja: 東海驛
- Revised Romanization: Donghaeyeok
- McCune–Reischauer: Tonghaeyŏk

General information
- Location: Songjeong-dong, Donghae, Gangwon; South Korea
- Coordinates: 37°29′52.72″N 129°7′21.94″E
- Operator: Korail
- Lines: Yeongdong Line, Samcheok Line, Mukhohang Line, Bukpyeong Line
- Platforms: 2
- Tracks: 4

Construction
- Structure type: Aboveground

History
- Opened: July 31, 1940
Location

Donghae station is a railway station in Donghae City in Gangwon Province, South Korea. Donghae station is on the Yeongdong Line, the Samcheok Line, the Mukhohang Line, and the Bukpyeong Line.

== History ==
- July 31, 1940: Opened as Bukpyeong Station
- January 1, 1976: Designated a handling station for the arrival of anthracite for civilian use
- December 30, 1983: New construction of station building completed
- June 1, 1984: Station name changed to Donghae Station
- March 15, 1990: Saemaeul-ho service between Cheongnyangni and the Donghae begins
- September 8, 2005: With the opening of the Donghae to Gangneung electrification system, the replacement of locomotives was abolished
- March 2, 2020: Starting KTX operation on the Gyeonggang Line with the opening of the Gangneung Triangle Line
- August 1, 2021: KTX-Eum starts operation
- September 1, 2023: ITX-MAUM Starts Operation
