= Donghae, Gangwon =

City in Gangwon, South Korea

Donghae
- Municipal city
- Mukho Harbor and the city surrounding it

- Flag

- Location in South Korea
- Coordinates: 37°31′29″N 129°06′51″E
- Country: South Korea
- State: Gangwon
- First official recorded: 102 AD
- City established: April 1, 1980
- Administrative divisions: 10 dong

Government
  - mayor: Sim Gyu-eon (심규언)

Area
  - Total: 180.01 km^{2} (69.50 sq mi)

Population (September 2024)
  - Total: 87,724
  - Density: 521.61/km^{2} (1,351.0/sq mi)
- Area code: +82-33
- Climate: Cfa

Korean name
- Hangul: 동해시
- Hanja: 東海市
- RR: Donghae-si
- MR: Tonghae-si

Donghae (Korean: 동해; Korean pronunciation: [toŋ.ɦɛ]; lit. 'East[ern] Sea') is a city in the state of Gangwon, South Korea. There are two major ports: Donghae Harbor and Mukho Harbor. The city is located on the Yeongdong Line railroad and the Donghae Expressway. Numerous caverns are found in the city, as in neighboring Samcheok. Hanzhong University was located here.

== Location ==
Donghae is located in the central region of the east coast of South Korea. Jeongseon County is to the west and Gangneung to the north. It contains the southern terminus of the Donghae Expressway, and the No. 7 national way passes through the city.

The city is mostly mountainous and has natural resources such as Mureung Valley and beautiful beaches. Here, the high Taebaek Mountains lie along the eastern coast, preventing rivers from meeting the coast. However, in the rainy season, spontaneous water flow is possible.

== Climate ==
Climate data for Donghae (1993–2020 normals, extremes 1992–present)
| Month | Jan | Feb | Mar | Apr | May | Jun | Jul | Aug | Sep | Oct | Nov | Dec | Year |
|---|---|---|---|---|---|---|---|---|---|---|---|---|---|
| Record high °C (°F) | 16.1 (61.0) | 23.7 (74.7) | 26.9 (80.4) | 32.6 (90.7) | 33.5 (92.3) | 35.2 (95.4) | 37.1 (98.8) | 37.0 (98.6) | 34.2 (93.6) | 29.7 (85.5) | 24.4 (75.9) | 18.4 (65.1) | 37.1 (98.8) |
| Mean daily maximum °C (°F) | 5.4 (41.7) | 7.0 (44.6) | 11.2 (52.2) | 16.7 (62.1) | 21.1 (70.0) | 23.4 (74.1) | 26.6 (79.9) | 27.6 (81.7) | 23.8 (74.8) | 19.7 (67.5) | 13.7 (56.7) | 7.7 (45.9) | 17.0 (62.6) |
| Daily mean °C (°F) | 1.1 (34.0) | 2.8 (37.0) | 6.8 (44.2) | 12.2 (54.0) | 16.6 (61.9) | 19.6 (67.3) | 23.2 (73.8) | 24.1 (75.4) | 19.8 (67.6) | 15.1 (59.2) | 9.3 (48.7) | 3.4 (38.1) | 12.8 (55.0) |
| Mean daily minimum °C (°F) | −2.8 (27.0) | −1.4 (29.5) | 2.4 (36.3) | 7.7 (45.9) | 12.5 (54.5) | 16.5 (61.7) | 20.5 (68.9) | 21.1 (70.0) | 16.2 (61.2) | 10.7 (51.3) | 5.0 (41.0) | −0.8 (30.6) | 9.0 (48.2) |
| Record low °C (°F) | −14.0 (6.8) | −13.7 (7.3) | −6.9 (19.6) | −1.4 (29.5) | 3.5 (38.3) | 6.0 (42.8) | 12.2 (54.0) | 14.4 (57.9) | 8.3 (46.9) | −0.1 (31.8) | −6.2 (20.8) | −11.9 (10.6) | −14.0 (6.8) |
| Average precipitation mm (inches) | 46.4 (1.83) | 44.0 (1.73) | 57.6 (2.27) | 72.3 (2.85) | 63.3 (2.49) | 105.9 (4.17) | 230.8 (9.09) | 227.2 (8.94) | 219.8 (8.65) | 102.9 (4.05) | 71.6 (2.82) | 22.5 (0.89) | 1,264.3 (49.78) |
| Average precipitation days (≥ 0.1 mm) | 5.6 | 6.1 | 8.5 | 8.3 | 8.8 | 10.7 | 14.4 | 14.8 | 12.1 | 7.9 | 7.3 | 4.1 | 108.6 |
| Average snowy days | 5.1 | 4.0 | 3.4 | 0.2 | 0.0 | 0.0 | 0.0 | 0.0 | 0.0 | 0.0 | 0.4 | 1.4 | 14.6 |
| Average relative humidity (%) | 47.6 | 52.2 | 56.4 | 58.8 | 67.0 | 77.8 | 82.1 | 82.3 | 79.0 | 67.2 | 56.5 | 46.0 | 64.4 |
| Mean monthly sunshine hours | 188.1 | 181.0 | 202.3 | 211.9 | 221.3 | 179.7 | 155.0 | 163.4 | 165.3 | 190.3 | 172.6 | 188.3 | 2,219.2 |
| Percentage possible sunshine | 58.1 | 58.8 | 52.5 | 52.9 | 47.4 | 38.6 | 32.3 | 37.3 | 43.5 | 54.0 | 56.2 | 61.9 | 48.2 |
Source: Korea Meteorological Administration (snow and percent sunshine 1981–2010)

== Symbols ==
- Tree: Ginkgo tree
- Flower: Red Prumusumume
- Bird: Seagull

== Free industry zone ==
Donghae area and its neighborhood are a free industry zone. From this, Gangwon province and Donghae city has overtaken team for investment.

== Cruise ferry ==
A cruise ferry line connecting Russia, South Korea and Japan opened in the summer of 2008. DBS Ferry currently transits between Donghae, Sakaiminato, Tottori and Vladivostok.

== Tourism ==
- Mukho harbor
- Mureung Valley
- Cheongok caves
- Mangsang Beach
- Yakcheon village
- Samhwa temple

== Sister cities ==
Donghae City has the following sister cities:

- Gimje, North Jeolla Province – April 27, 1999
- Dobong District, Seoul – October 7, 1999
- Tsuruga, Fukui, Japan – April 13, 1981
- Nakhodka, Primorsky Krai, Russia – November 10, 1991
- Tumen, Jilin, China – April 28, 1995
- Federal Way, Washington, United States – April 1, 2000
- Saint John, New Brunswick, Canada – May 30, 2008
- Bolu, Turkey – June 15, 2009

== See also ==
- List of cities in South Korea
- Geography of South Korea
