= Cultural impact of BTS =

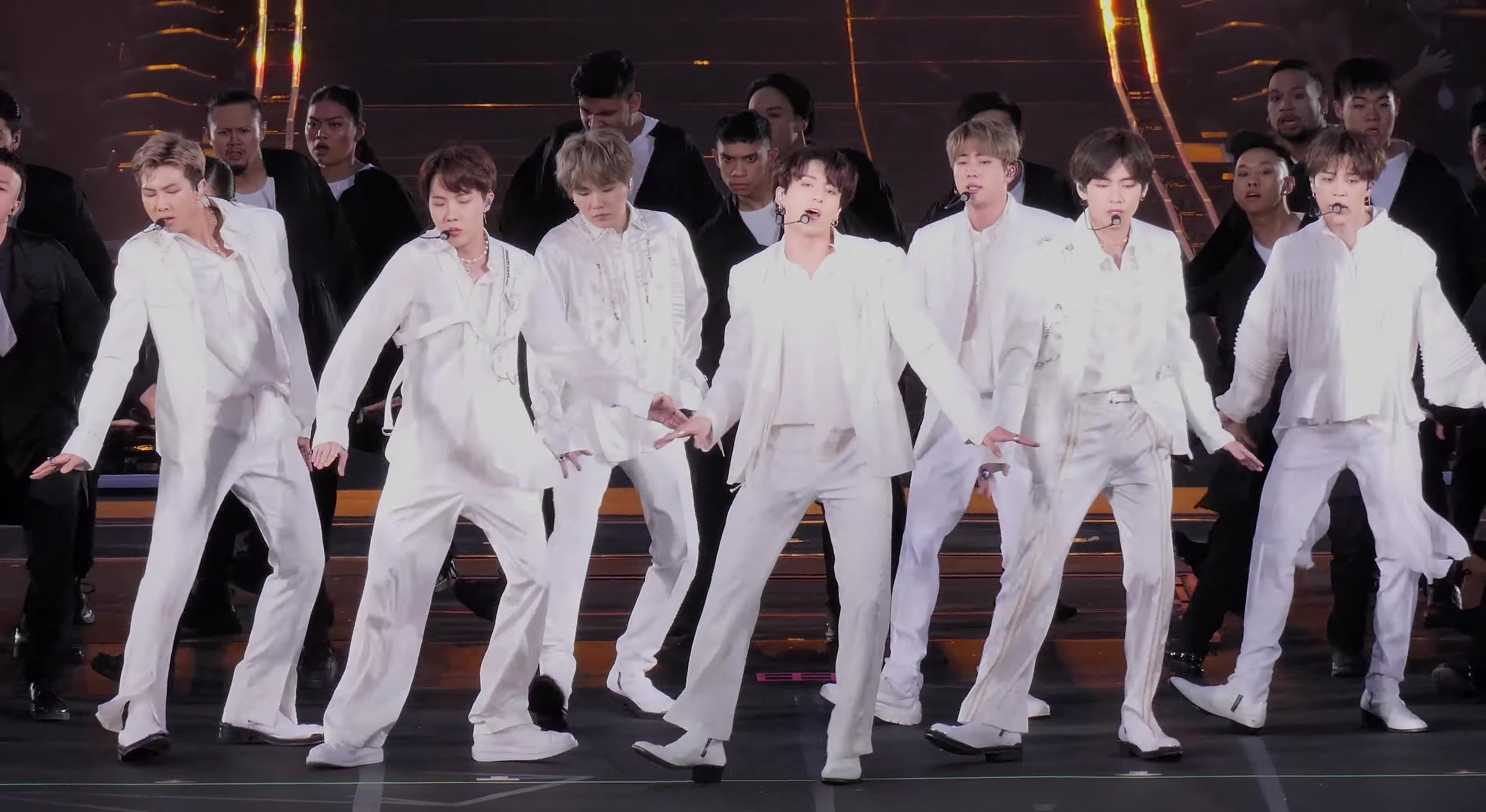
BTS performing "Not Today" during Speak Yourself tour at MetLife Stadium, May 18, 2019

South Korean boy band BTS was formed in 2010 and debuted in 2013. The septet has had a significant cultural impact both in Korea and internationally, and is considered one of the leading figures of the Hallyu wave in the 21st century. The commercial influence of BTS upon the Korean economy, along with its philanthropic and other commercial ventures, has received extensive attention in the press and in financial markets.

== International impact ==
Internationally, BTS has been described as "easily the biggest and most successful name in K-pop in the world" that can "do things no other name in their genre can", with Time giving them the nickname "Princes of Pop". Billboard's Senior Vice President Silvio Pietroluongo said that BTS is comparable to and as influential as the Beatles and the Monkees. Nielsen Music Vice President Helena Kosinski said that "although BTS weren't the first to open the doors to K-Pop worldwide, they were the first to become mainstream. They don't just appeal to young people but also to the 50s and 60s age demographic."

In 2019, BTS was again named as one of the top 10 Global Recording Artists of the Year by IFPI, for a second time, ranking number 7. In 2020, BTS became the first non-English artist to be named IFPI's #1 Global Recording Artist of the Year. In 2021, BTS became the first Act to be named IFPI's #1 Global Recording Artist of the Year two years in a row. In November 2019, Billboard ranked BTS fourth on their Top Social Artist of the 2010s list, making them the highest group on the list. BTS was also ranked No. 45 on Billboard's Top Touring Artists of the 2010s list. It is the highest-ranked Asian act on the list, as well as the only non-English-speaking act.

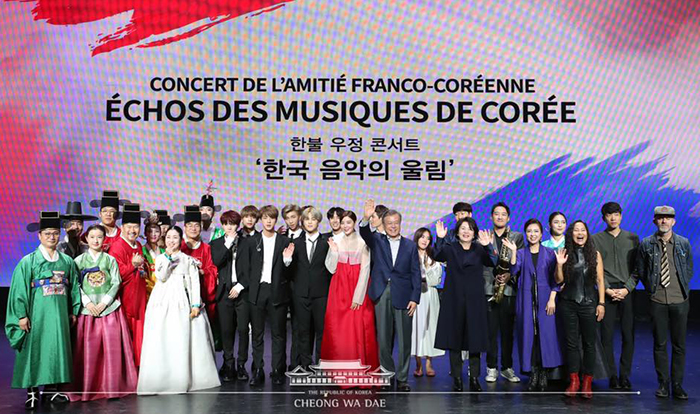
South Korean President Moon Jae-in and BTS among others at the Korea-France Friendship Concert in 2018

BTS has been often regarded as the "biggest boy band in the world". They have also appeared in various power listings. The most tweeted-about celebrities in the world from 2017 to 2020, the group was included in Time's list of the 25 most influential people on the internet from 2017 to 2019, featured on the magazine's October 2018 international edition cover as "Next Generation Leaders," and were listed as one of Time 100's most influential people in 2019. After BTS released its single "Idol," the National Gugak Center had to expand the amount of Korean instrument sounds available because of increased demand from Korean and foreign producers alike.

BTS also appeared in Bloomberg Market's 50 most influential in 2018. In 2019, BTS ranked 43rd on ''Forbes''' annual list of the 100 highest-paid celebrities with earnings of $57 million. BTS also ranked first on the list of "Top Rank Global Sustainable Future Leaders" during an announcement from the UN-sponsored SDG association at the United Nations headquarters, and BTS' fanclub, ARMY, was noted as the "Top Rank Sustainable Global grou'." Other notable people included in the list were Malala Yousafzai and Bill Gates.

The group's influence has led it to address the United Nations at their 73rd General Assembly and to perform before 400 officials including South Korean President Moon Jae-in at the 2018 "Korea-France Friendship Concert in Paris," a summit meant to show the friendly relations between France and South Korea. Moon Hee-sang, Speaker of the National Assembly, said that "BTS is doing most of our work" and attributed the results of his overseas trip to the credit of the global group on an overseas trip to promote "sales diplomacy."

BTS holds twenty-three Guinness World Records.

=== Asia ===
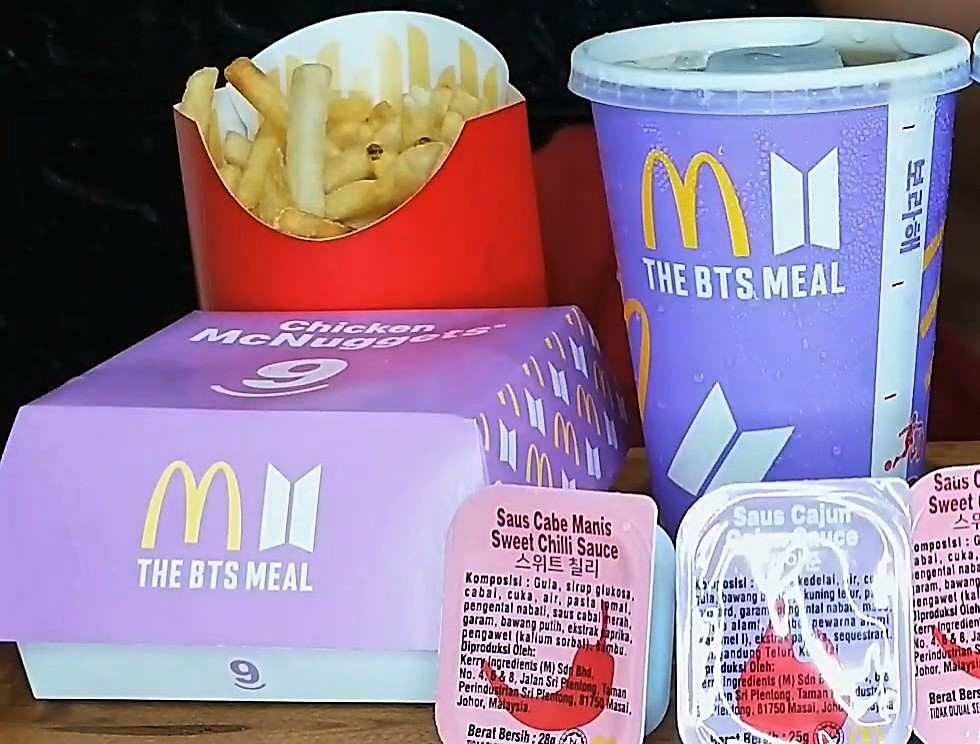
The BTS Meal in collaboration with McDonald's

When the BTS McDonald's meal was released in Indonesia, it caused McDonald's restaurants to close because of the breaking of COVID regulations because of the influx of customers. In October 2019, BTS performed at King Fahd International Stadium in Riyadh and became the first foreign act to perform a solo concert in Saudi Arabia. In 2020, BTS was the most streamed artist overall in Vietnam.

==== China ====
Although there were THAAD restrictions starting in 2016 that blocked the sales of South Korean items in China, BTS fan clubs were broke the record for the most albums purchased at one time. The fan clubs ordered through surrogate shoppers to get around the mandate.

BTS have often been used for political purposes in China because of its popularity. In 2020 during a speech that a member, RM, made at the Korea Society for promoting U.S.-Korean relations, he stated, "We will always remember the history of pain that our two nations shared together and the sacrifices of countless men and women." The Chinese Communist Party used his statement for political purposee by using newspapers controlled by the party to point out that he did not mention the lives China lost when backing the North. BTS related items began getting pulled from stores in China as a result. The attack lasted less than two days before the press began quietly redacting statements that it had put because of the backlash.

==== India ====
Indian President Ram Nath Kovind mentioned BTS in 2018 at an official banquet and stated, "Korean popular culture has also charmed us. From 'Gangnam Style' to Korea's band 'BTS', our youth are captivated by the tunes of these iconic pop groups...." According to The Indian Express, during the COVID-19 pandemic, a Korean wave swept up India with BTS, along with popular Korean dramas Crash Landing on You and Squid Game leading the curve.

==== Japan ====
BTS began the third Korean wave in Japan despite diplomatic difficulties between the two countries. With BTS and the girl group Twice in the lead, it went from a subculture to mainstream. In 2018, when the Japanese boy group King & Prince debuted, its agency stating the group was modeled after BTS because of its popularity. In 2019, the group Ballistik Boyz debuted and was modeled after BTS as well. In 2021, Rakuten Group did a survey to find which country's fashion is the most influential in Japan. Men in their teens and twenties named BTS as the second-most popular fashion influence, after only Takuya Kimura. During the 2020 Summer Olympics, BTS was played during some of the sporting events.

BTS broke Oricon's record and became the first artist to achieve over 10 million streams during a single week for at least three songs. BTS is the second foreign singers to reach number one on Oricon album charts, the first being Michael Jackson. It is also the first Korean album to hit number one on the Oricon chart. Map of the Soul: 7 – The Journey set new album records for the highest first day sales by both a foreigner and a Korean artist in Japan. With its album BTS, the Best, it became the first Korean group to sell one million copies of an album and it went on to become the best selling album of the year within a single day of sales. The single "MIC Drop/DNA/Crystal Snow" is the highest-ranking song by a Korean artist on the yearly Oricon chart that was ever achieved, and "Butter" became the fastest song to receive platinum certification in history for the chart.

In 2018, BTS and the girl group Twice were invited to perform at the popular show Kōhaku Uta Gassen. Both appearances were cancelled without warning, and it was said afterwards that it was because of the BTS member Jimin wearing a T-shirt that depicted the atomic bomb detonating with text celebrating Korea's liberation from Japanese rule during World War II. It was questioned why the ban was happened only then, as the incident had happened in 2017, and BTS had been allowed to perform in December 2017 at Japan Music Station Super Live. At a later date, it was revealed it had been banned for political reasons because the Supreme Court of Korea ruled that Japan's Nippon Steel & Sumitomo Metal Corp. needed to compensate four Koreans for forced labor during the war. A member of BTS, RM, had also tweeted about National Liberation Day of Korea from Japan, which added to the fodder.

==== North Korea ====
Despite strict crack downs on K-pop, BTS have been experiencing popularity with North Korean youth. If contraband is found, an individual can face five to fifteen years in prison. A private source stated that its popularity was because of its meaningful lyrics, which tell listeners to "love themselves." In 2020, North Korean soldiers were caught partying and listening to "Blood Sweat & Tears." To combat their growing popularity, government propaganda was created and calls Korean groups like BTS "slaves" and states that they "suffer miserable lives." North Korean high schoolers were still caught listening to BTS after the mandate.

==== South Korea ====
BTS accounted for 41.9 percent of album sales in the first half of 2019, up from its market share of 25.3 percent the previous year. According to a JoyNews24 Power People of 2019 survey among industry professionals, BTS was chosen as number 1 with 74 votes, with number 2 being Parasite Director Bong Joon-ho with 29 votes. BTS topped the list of Forbes Korea Power Celebrity in 2018, 2020, 2021, and 2022. It ranked fifth in 2017 and second in 2019. In December 2019, according to the annual survey conducted by Gallup Korea, BTS were the most preferred artists of 2019 for a second consecutive year. The septet were the first artist not from a "Big Three" entertainment company (SM, YG and JYP) to win Artist of the Year at the 18th Mnet Asian Music Awards in December.

Celebrating the Korean music icon Seo Taiji's 25th anniversary as a part of his anniversary project "Time: Traveler," BTS released a remake of Seo Taiji's 1995 classic "Come Back Home" in July 2017 and reworked the sound and lyrics to similar sentiments toward societal change that Seo Taiji argued for in his songs. BTS was later invited by Seo Taiji to perform as backup vocalists and dancers for eight songs in his Seoul Olympic Stadium concert held early September. During the concert, Seo Taiji acknowledged BTS' thematic similarities to his music and recognized the group as his musical successors. He declared, "This is your generation now. Show them."

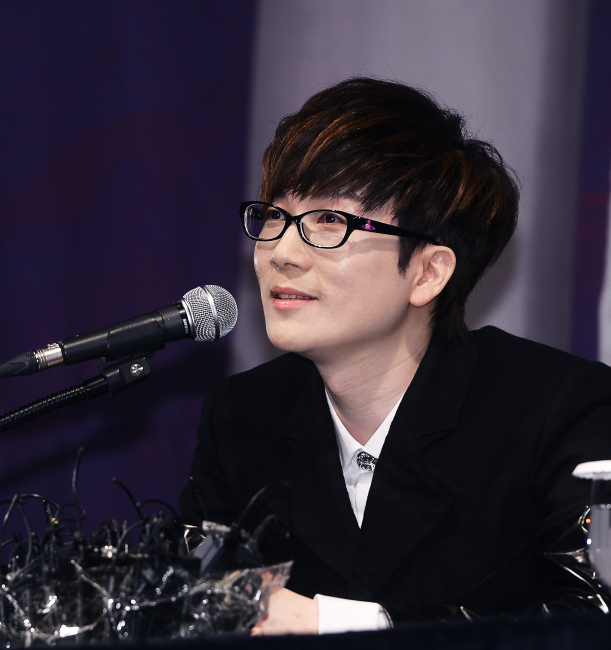
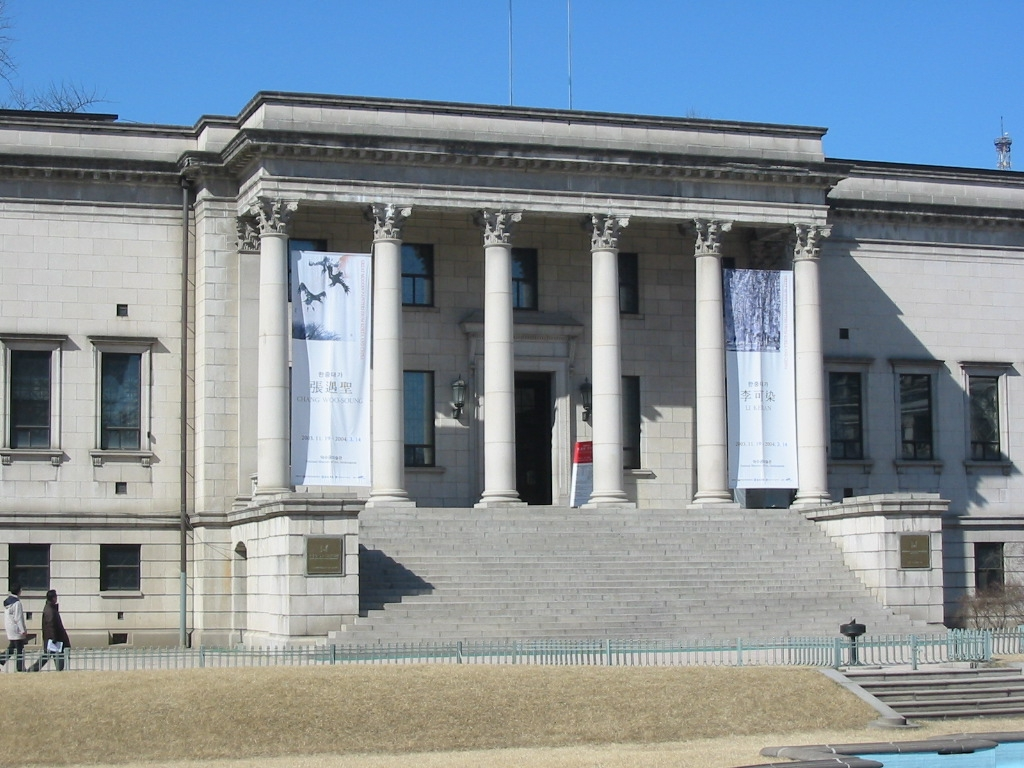
Seo Taeji who has been an influence to BTS and the Museum of Modern and Contemporary Art where "Square" was exhibited.

Kang Soojung, an exhibition manager at the Museum of Modern and Contemporary Art, said that while preparing the 50th anniversary exhibition called "Square," she was greatly influenced by BTS' hidden track "Sea." BTS appeared on You Quiz on the Block, a South Korean variety show program, where it broke the show's rating records for viewership in March 2021. It was announced in 2021 that the K-pop group Blitzers was modeled after BTS. Congresswoman Ryu Ho-jeong used pictures of member Jeon Jungkook showing his tattoos in order to help decriminalize tattoos as they are illegal in the country.

In September 2019, President Moon Jae-in also mentioned BTS in his announcement for his "3 major innovation strategies for the contents industry." He stated that BTS has pioneered innovative business models that communicate directly with fans. In October 2019, The Ministry of Culture, Sports and Tourism selected BTS as a recipient for a k-popLetter of Appreciation" for showing the world the beauty of Korean traditional culture (hangul, hanbok, and gugak) through creative reinterpretations in theie music. According to the "2019 South Korean National Image" survey conducted by the Ministry of Culture, Sports and Tourism and its affiliate the Korean Culture and Information Service among 16 countries, BTS were chosen number 2 with 5.5% votes. Despite cultural medals traditionally being given to recipients with more than 15 years of notable achievements, BTS became the youngest recipients ever honored with the Order of Cultural Merit by the President of South Korea in 2018, five years after debuting, for noteworthy contributions in spreading Korean culture and language. In 2020, they were again honored as the youngest recipients and the only musicians in the award's history to receive the James A. Van Fleet Award in recognition of their outstanding contributions to the promotion of U.S.-Korea relations. At the end of the year, the "BTS Law" was passed by the National Assembly to allow its members to put off their mandated military service until they reach 30 years of age, instead of 28.

On July 21, 2021, President Moon Jae-in appointed BTS as Special Presidential Envoy for Future Generations and Culture. The appointment is aimed to "raise awareness on global agendas, such as sustainable development, to our future generations and to strengthen the nation's diplomatic power across the world." The group represented South Korea at various international events, such as the 76th United Nations General Assembly.

On August 21, 2024, Seoul Tourism announced Jin as the honorary tourism ambassador of Seoul City for the group's latest campaign, "Feel Soul Good."

==== Philippines ====
Congressman Alan Peter Cayetano made a "BTS sa Kongreso" (BTS in Congress) bloc with six other representavtives to bring awareness to a Charter Change that he wanted to be implemented. Cayetano called it a success despite the backlash that he received, as it went viral, and some BTS fans supported it. A study completed by iPrice Group in the Philippines found that searches for a brand BTS endorses can more than double after a collaboration, with brands like Coca-Cola and Louis Vuitton growing by 127% and 65% respectively. In 2021, images of Jungkook were posted by John Geesnell Yap, the mayor of Tagbilaran, to convince citizens to receive the COVID shot.

=== Europe ===
BTS are the first Asian musical act to get a number one album in Germany. In June 2020, a bimonthly magazine dedicated solely to BTS was released in Italy and reflected its popularity.

In 2016, BTS became the first Korean artist to enter the Official Albums Chart with their album Wings in the UK, and in 2021 became the most nominated Korean artist at the MTV Europe Music Awards. It also hold the record for the K-Pop act, with the most top 10 hits on the UK Singles Chart. Oli London, a British influencer, got eighteen surgeries costing up to £150k to look like member Jimin. It was the first Korean group to sell out and perform at Wembley Stadium and the first Korean artist to be nominated at the Brit Awards.

=== North America ===
==== Canada ====
In Canada, BTS is the second-highest Asian act to chart on the Canada CHR/Top Forty; it peaked at number six with "Butter" and was beaten only by Psy's "Gangnam Style," which hit number two. It also holds the record for the longest charting song by a Korean artist by spending twenty-eight weeks on the Canadian Hot 100 with "Dynamite."

==== Mexico ====
During the 2018 FIFA World Cup, Mexico streamed BTS and began playing its songs on the radio to thank South Korea for defeating Germany, as it inadvertently kept the country in the World Cup. When the BTS McDonald's meal was released, fans were in line hours before stores were opened, with many waiting up to two hours to get a meal. Within a few hours on the first day, all stores had run out of the special packaging for the meal.

==== United States ====
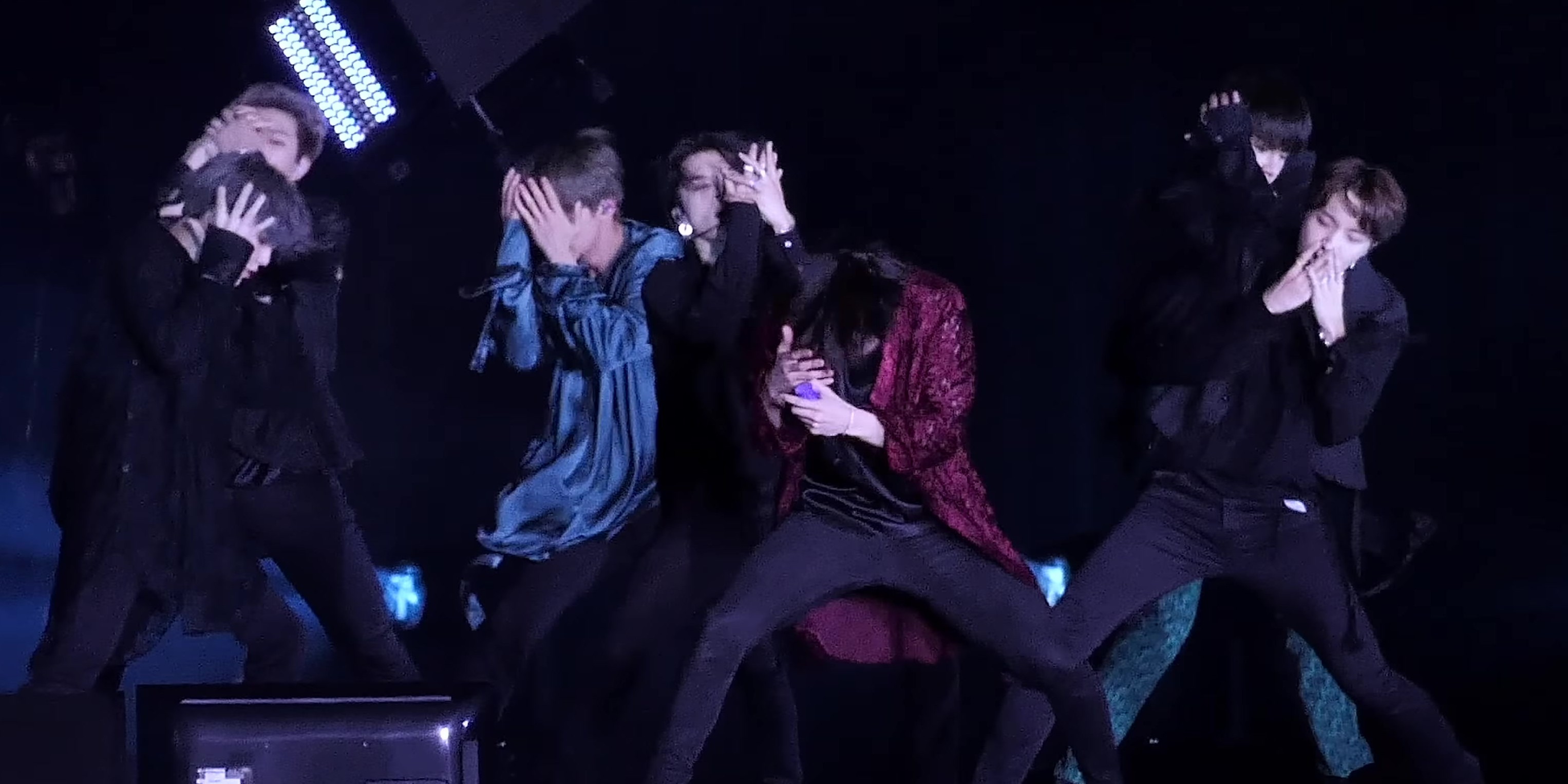
BTS performing "Fake Love" at Love Yourself World Tour at Rose Bowl in Pasadena, California in 2019.

BTS became the first K-pop group to receive its own Twitter emoji in May 2016. As the first non-English speaking artist to make the Global Artist Chart in 2018, BTS became the second- and third best-selling albums worldwide and was the second best-selling artists worldwide in terms of physical, digital, and streaming platforms; it was beaten only by Drake. BTS accounted for 72.7 percent of the album consumption units generated by K-pop acts in 2018 out of a total of 17 acts. The group was also listed as one of the most influential artists of the decade by CNN, for "popularizing K-pop in the US." It was named 2019 Hitmakers Group of the Year by Variety in 2019.

In California, BTS inspired a teacher to have his school be the first in the country to offer a Korean American Culture and Society course. American production companies began moving to bring aspects of K-pop idols to the music industry, particularly the reality competitions to create idol groups. Aja Romano of Vox stated that it was likely a direct result of BTS's influence on the industry. In October 2021, it was announced that 26 Korean words would be added to the Oxford English Dictionary. It was noted that BTS, along with the popular Korean franchises Squid Game and Parasite, helped make the words well known. In 2021, a marked growth of Korea's influence in the United States was noted; it jumped up thirteen places from the year before and ranked fifteenth overall for the year. That was attributed to BTS' growing influence in the country. BTS was referred to as a part of South Korea's soft power in politics.

"It’s difficult for me to say things like A led to B, but what I can say is that BTS’ success in the U.S. market was achieved by a formula different from the American mainstream formula. Loyalty built through direct contact with fans had a lot to do with that."

— Bang Si-hyuk, founder and chairman of Big Hit Entertainment, discussing the success of BTS, Time

BTS became the first K-pop act to remain atop the Billboard World Albums for multiple weeks. It also became the first Korean group to top the Billboard Social 50 chart. It spent 210 weeks total at number one before it was put in hiatus in December 2020 and was the first-ever musical act to chart over 200 weeks on it.

BTS holds the record for highest charting Korean song in the US, with "Life Goes On" hitting number one on the Billboard Hot 100 chart. It also holds the record for highest charting non-English song. They holds the record for highest charting Japanese song, with "Film Out" hitting number one on the Billboard Global 200 and the charting Japanese album BTS, the Best hitting number nineteen on the Billboard 200. The band was also the first Korean artist to reach number one on the Billboard Hot 100 chart. BTS are the first to have three number one albums in a year on the Billboard 200 since the Beatles.

BTS has won various awards in the United States.It is the first Asian to be nominated and to win Best Artist at the American Music Awards and the first all-Korean band to perform at the Grammy Awards and to receive a nomination. They were the first Korean group to win a Billboard Music Award as well. Esquire called BTS one of the top ten best bands of all time and ranked it with others such as The Supremes, Destiny's Child, and Queen.

Love Yourself: Answer became the first Korean album to earn gold certification in 2018, and in 2020, Map of the Soul: 7 became first Korean album to earn platinum. The most-decorated Korean act by the RIAA, they were the first Korean act to amass over a billion streams and the first to hit five billion streams on Spotify as well.

In 2018, BTS became the first-ever Korean artist to perform at a stadium in the United States after it performed at Citi Field. It was the first Asian act to sell out the Rose Bowl. Their Rose Bowl concerts are the single highest-grossing engagement in the venue's Boxscore history, out-pacing previous high marks by Taylor Swift and U2, as well as co-headlining stints by Beyoncé & Jay-Z and Eminem & Rihanna.

In July 2024, the music-themed Grammy Museum in Los Angeles, California, announced that a special K-pop exhibit would take place in August 2024, and display the accessories and performance gear worn by artists under Hybe, including BTS.

=== South America ===
==== Argentina ====
The Korean Wave began in Argentina during 2021, with BTS, Squid Game, and Korean food leading the front. In June 2021, the Centro Cultural Coreano (CCC) (Korean Cultural Center) in Argentina announced that it would host a Latin American K-pop contest inspired by BTS. It was one of the largest contests to be inspired by BTS, as it encompasseed several countries from a large region, including groups from Argentina, Bolivia, Brazil, Cuba, Ecuador, Guatemala, Mexico, Paraguay, and other countries.

==== Chile ====
When BTS held concerts in Chile back in 2017, its concert sold out in a record-breaking two hours despite no advertisements for the show. It also became the fastest K-pop group to sell out the Movistar Arena, Chile's largest indoor arena. Jeff Benjamin from The New York Times stated that BTS is so popular that it does not bother to advertise anything that they do. Fans wait in line a week ahead to have a chance to get BTS tickets.

== Musical influence ==
BTS' work has influenced numerous artists, including (G)I-dle, D-Crunch's Hyunho, The Boyz' Younghoon and Hwall, SF9's Zuho, Euna Kim, Golden Child's Jaehyun, Wanna One, IN2IT, Park Ji-hoon, Kim Dong-han, Seven O'Clock, Hyeongseop X Euiwoong, Noir, Victon's Sejun and Byungchan, Loona, Newkidd, and Enhypen.

K-pop groups and idols began changing the themes of their lyrics from love stories to words such as "looking for myself" after BTS' "Love Yourself" era and RM's speech at the United Nations. Their success on the global pop market kicked off a new trend among Korean bands, with a growing number of idols, including Monsta X and Stray Kids, starting to present more personal messages when they write lyrics. Some artists have published conceptual trilogies, built imaginary worlds around their music, and shown greater propensity for darker themes after they noticed BTS' success with doing the same. Various countries have tried to replicate making bands similar to BTS, including South Korea, Japan, and the United States.

== Commercial influence ==
=== South Korean economy ===
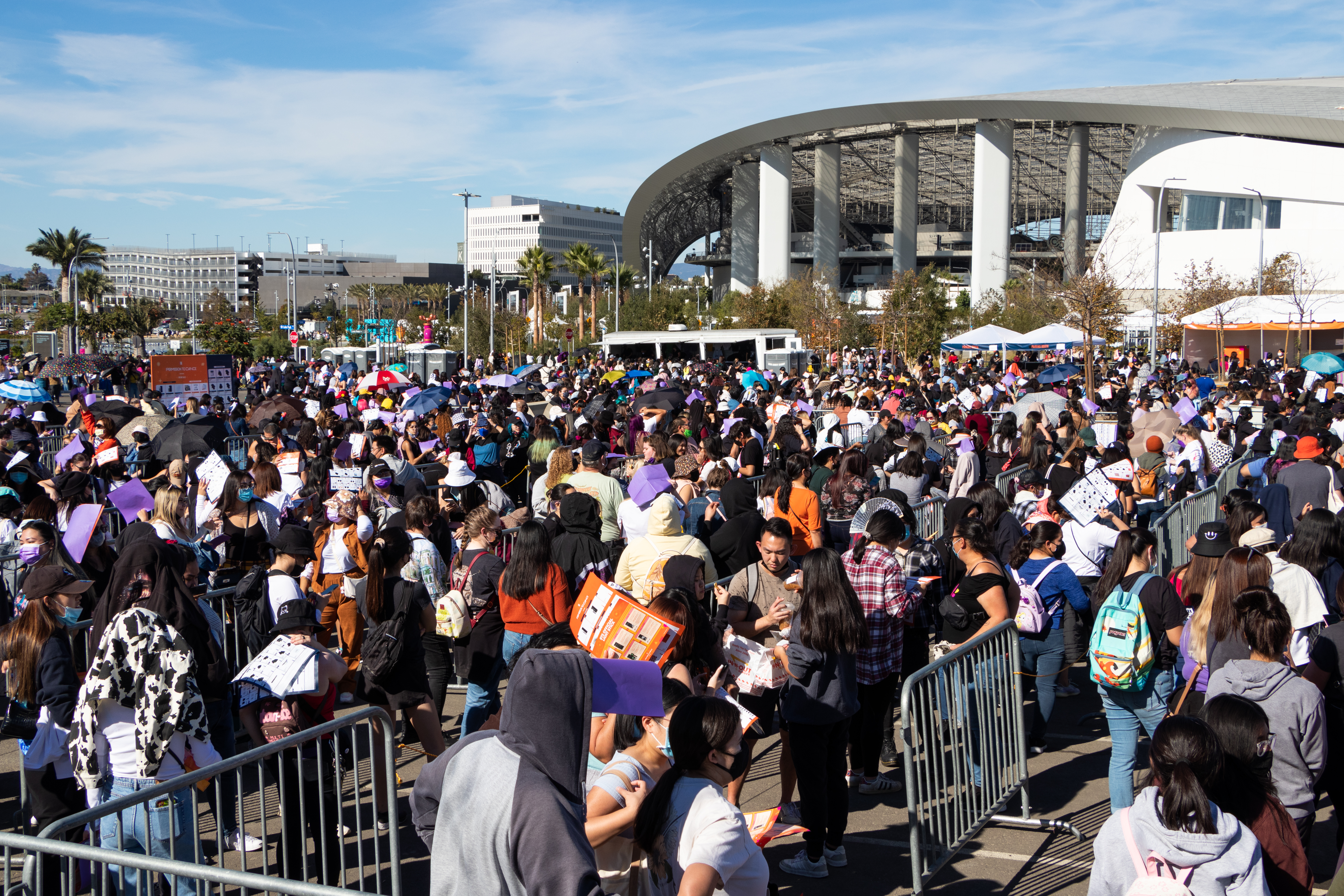
Fans queueing to buy BTS merchandise before a concert in Los Angeles.

In 2019, BTS was believed to have revitalized the Korean music industry and to have had an estimated 1-2% effect upon the entire Korean economy, in addition to its international influences. Credited for the surge in popularity of online purchases of K-pop items and the growth of the Korean Wave between 2016 and 2018 by the Korea Customs Service and Korea Foundation, BTS was cited as one of the main driving forces for the recovery of South Korea's music-related sector to levels seen before China's 2016 ban on domestic cultural contents over soured diplomatic relations.

Yung Duk Kim, vice president and chief operating officer of the Korea Creative Content Agency, stated that K-pop had "skyrocketed" since BTS' popularity surged and created jobs not only for BTS and it team but also other K-pop idols.

=== "BTS effect" and corporate influence ===
Various news outlets coined the term the "BTS effect" to refer to the commercial effects of BTS' influence, such as when KB Kookmin Bank savings accounts increased six-fold compared to the prior year after BTS' endorsement and when stock prices of entertainment companies in South Korea shot up for five days after BTS topped the U.S. Billboard 200. The effect was also observed when companies tied to BTS, such as Netmarble, NetMark, Soribada, Key Shares, GMP, Diffie, and Mattel, had their stocks rise. In October 2019, Mattel's international gross sales rose 10% to $721.7 million from the sales of dolls based on BTS. Data firm SM2 Networks estimated Hyundai Motor received KR₩ 600 billion ($502 million) in promotional results after commissioning BTS as their promotional models in 2018. The Bank of Korea Economic Statistics System stated that South Korea's balance of payments for music and entertainment reached $114.7 million in the first quarter of 2019, which it attributed to an improved relationship between China and South Korea and the breakout global success of BTS, particularly in North America.

=== Tourism and live events ===
Signed on as tourism ambassadors in 2017, the Seoul Metropolitan Government credited BTS for the recovery of Seoul's shrinking tourism industry following the 2016 THAAD controversy with China since it brought in an average of 790,000 tourists to Korea annually. In December 2018, the Hyundai Research Institute estimated that BTS was worth more than $3.67 billion to the Korean economy each year and attracted one in every thirteen foreigners who visited Korea. BTS' two day fan-meetings held in Seoul and Busan in June 2019 generated a total economic effect of ₩481 billion ($408 million) to both cities accounting for 1.6% of Busan's 2018 GDP, and 0.9% of Seoul's 2018 GDP. The three-day concert finale in Seoul for its Love Yourself World Tour in October 2019 was estimated to have an economic value of almost ₩1 trillion ($862 million) and brought in 187,000 foreign visitors to South Korea.

=== Music industry and global sales ===
As of June 2019, BTS' economic effect on South Korea was estimated to be over ₩5.5 trillion ($4.65 billion) per year, about 0.3% of South Korea's GDP. That is comparable to Korean Air, the flagship airline of South Korea, whose contribution to South Korea's GDP is 0.7%. The 2019 annual ticket sales data released by the Korean online ticketing site Interpark revealed that BTS' world tour "Love Yourself: Speak Yourself" concert at the Seoul Olympic Stadium ranked number one, with BTS topping the ticket sales for the second consecutive year on Interpark. Outside of South Korea, BTS' concerts at Wembley Stadium were estimated to have brought around ₩100 billion ($82 million) as a direct economic effect to the city of London. After BTS went to Malta for its show Bon Voyage 3, the Malta Tourism Authority reported a 237% increase of Korean tourists visiting the country and credited BTS as the reason for the increase. Along with Ariana Grande and Drake, BTS was credited as a key act boosting global music sales to $19 billion in 2018. Such a profit had not been seen since 2006, after digital purchases gained momentum.

In 2020, a joint report by the Ministry of Culture, Sports and Tourism and Korea Culture and Tourism Institute estimated an economic effect of ₩1.7 trillion ($1.43 billion) to be created by BTS' entry at number one in the Billboard Hot 100 Chart with "Dynamite." BTS was again credited as one of the acts that helped boost global music industry revenues to $21.6 billion in 2020, the highest figure since 2002.

=== Recognition and educational initiatives ===
Forbes Korea named BTS the most influential celebrities of Korea in 2018 and 2020, and BTS ranked 43rd in the Forbes Celebrity 100 (2019) as one of the world's top-earning celebrities. As of 2019, BTS is purportedly worth more than US$4.65 billion to South Korea's economy each year, or 0.3 percent of the country's GDP. It attracts one in every 13 foreign tourists who visited South Korea and were cited as one of the key acts in boosting global music sales to $19 billion in 2018.

Starting in 2020, BTS's management company, Big Hit Entertainment, sz listed publicly as part of Hybe Co., Ltd, which became valued at US$9.5 billion in 2022. In March 2020, Big Hit Entertainment launched a video series, "Learn Korean with BTS," on the social media app Weverse, which wss intended to "make it easy and fun for global fans who have difficulty enjoying BTS' music and contents due to the language barrier." The idea for the project emerged in reaction to fans asking for English subtitles for BTS' videos. The series consists of 30 three-minute lessons on Korean expressions and grammar using footage from existing BTS content on YouTube and VLive, such as "Run BTS!" and "Bangtan Bomb." The videos were developed in collaboration with experts at the Korean Language Content Institute and Hankuk University of Foreign Studies.

== BTS Universe ==
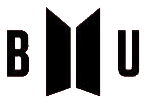
Logo for BTS Universe

The BTS Universe, also known as the Bangtan Universe or BU, is an alternate universe that is created by Big Hit Entertainment and winds through the group's output. The webtoon Save Me closely follows the story line, along with the book HYYH: The Notes 1. The chronology of the universe began with the song "I Need U" and spans to the present. It tells the story of the seven members in an alternate reality and depicts their anxieties and uncertainties as they confront their futures.

In a corporate briefing held on February 4, 2020, Big Hit also announced the upcoming release of its sequel HYYH: The Notes 2, the recreation of five BTS songs into five picture books, and the upcoming drama Youth to be produced in collaboration with Chorokbaem Media and renowned screenwriter Kim Soo-jin. Speaking to Billboard, Michelle Cho, an assistant professor of East Asian Popular Cultures at the University of Toronto, said, "As an audio-visual experience, "I Need U" inaugurated the Bangtan Universe—the coming-of-age storyline that brilliantly integrates the Most Beautiful Moment in Life [album] trilogy and continues in music videos, "concept videos" (mini-films), and the multiform, open-ended narrative that's been serialized in album liner notes and Twitter and Instagram posts."

Mariejo Ramos from The Inquirer said about the universe that "no other artists have successfully mixed the same literary technique to pop music in such a scale." It used the alternate universe and literary books, such as The Ones Who Walk Away from Omelas, as a framing device for its albums. Mixing the two has created an interactive environment for their fans who make theories when new material or hints are released.

It was announced in 2021 the drama Youth would be released. It would encapsulate the storyline created throughout the BU and Save Me webtoons. The drama was eventually titled Begins ≠ Youth and released on May 1, 2024.

== Endorsements ==
Several commercial endorsements made by BTS over the years have had a significant cultural impact because of the high visibility of marketing and advertisement campaigns. The group has maintained numerous global endorsement deals in various industries throughout its career. Partnered with Puma since 2015, BTS initially promoted its sportswear as Puma Korea's brand ambassadors and expanded to become global ambassadors in 2018 and promoting the remix of Puma's "Turin" and "Sportstyle" line worldwide. In 2019, BTS signed with Fila to endorse its sportswear. BTS has also served as global brand ambassadors for LG Electronics' 2018 LG G7 ThinQ telephone, and for Hyundai Motors' 2019 flagship SUV the "Palisade" and hydrogen fuel cell electric SUV, the "Nexo."

BTS' endorsement made Hyundai receive almost double the anticipated domestic order volume for the Palisade. BTS became global ambassadors of the electric street racing series Formula E to promote how electric vehicles can help combat climate change. In 2020, BTS partnered with Samsung Electronics on a limited edition BTS-themed version of the Galaxy S20+ and Galaxy Buds+. As the first male pop group to collaborate with Dior, BTS sported ensembles from Kim Jones' Pre-Fall 2019 collection at their concert at Stade de France. In April 2021, BTS were chosen as Louis Vuitton brand ambassadors.

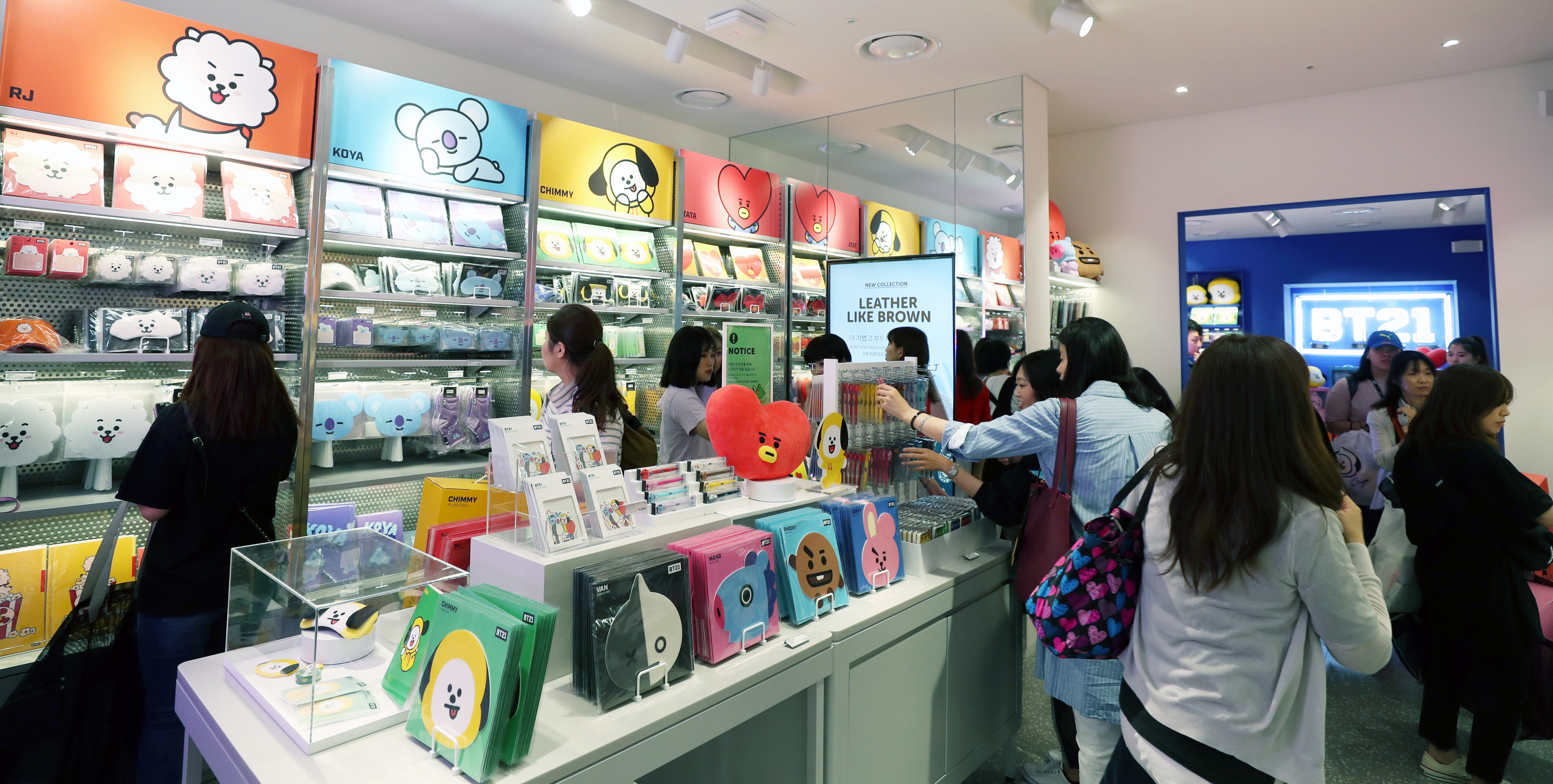
Fans shopping for BT21 goods at the Line Friends store in Mapo-gu, Seoul

In the entertainment sector, BTS published the webtoons Hip Hop Monster and We On through the Nate Webtoon portal and Save Me in collaboration with LICO and Line Webtoon. In the toy industry, Mattel created dolls modeled from BTS' outfits from the music video "Idol." Medicom Toy created the "BE@RBRICK", a block-like toy featuring the BTS logo and accents modeled after BTS' stage clothes, and Funko released BTS versions of Funko Pops.

BTS also partnered with the popular Korean communication app Line to create new Line 'characters' called BT21. The collaboration initially produced emojis and electronic stickers but later expanded to include fashion apparel, footwear, accessories, and other merchandise. Line flagship stores opened throughout Seoul before they spread across the global market into Japan, Taiwan, Hong Kong, and the United States. The BTS characters also partnered with the popular game Among Us to create limited edition characters, which would be available worldwide. In March 2023, Lego released the "Lego Ideas BTS Dynamite set".

In the gaming industry, Nexon released character avatars based on BTS for its role-playing game Elsword. BTS worked with DalcomSoft to release the rhythm game Superstar BTS in January 2018, as well as with Netmarble Games for the story-based, mobile simulation game BTS World released in June 2019. In December 2020, BTS collaborated with MapleStory to design their own special in-game items inspired by their favorite MapleStory childhood memories.

BTS also collaborated with Casetify to launch a new tech accessory collection globally and the ceramics company Kwangjuyo to release a BTS-themed line of ceramics. In February 2022, the online game developer and publisher Garena announced BTS as its global ambassadors for the mobile game Free Fire. The group worked with Cookie Run: Kingdom on a collaboration called "Braver Together" in October 2022.

In the food industry, BTS collaborated with McDonald's to launch the BTS Meal, which was available in 50 countries. BTS partnered with Baskin-Robbins Korea to launch limited-edition cakes and ice cream flavors. Snickers released limited-edition chocolate bars with purple packaging that featured BTS song titles. In collaboration with Oreo, BTS launched a limited edition hotteok-flavored cookies in 80 countries.

In Asia, BTS have worked as brand spokesmen for KB Kookmin Bank, one of the four largest banks in South Korea. The collaboration generated the opening of over 180,000 accounts, and BTS extended its contract with KB Kookmin Bank through 2019. Coca-Cola Korea signed BTS on as its new campaign models for promotions during the 2018 World Cup in Russia. In 2021, BTS participated in Coca-Cola's global campaign 'Uplift'. In the tourism sector, BTS has worked as brand models for Lotte Duty Free Shop since 2017 and as honorary tourism ambassadors for Seoul as part of the 'I Seoul U' program. In the beauty and apparel industry, BTS maintained a relationship with uniform brand SMART from 2016 to 2019. BTS have also promoted the face mask brand Mediheal, the cosmetics brand VT Cosmetics, and the contact lens brand Play/Up. Laneige released a lip-sleeping mask set, which features three scents that are based on the group's hits “Butter,” “Permission to Dance,” and “Dynamite.” In December 2022, Penshoppe released a "BTS Music Theme Collection".

BTS have promoted the vitamin supplement brand Lemona, Indonesian e-commerce company Tokopedia, massage chair brand Bodyfriend, SK Telecom, Philippine telecommunications company, Smart Communications and Lotte Chilsung's Kloud Draft beer. In 2021, the group has reportedly earned ₩65 billion from advertisements in a single year.
