= Dongyang (disambiguation) =

Dongyang (东阳市) is a county-level city in Zhejiang province, China.

Dongyang or Tongyang may also refer to:

== Places ==
- The Orient, in Chinese (东洋; 東洋; Dōngyáng) and Korean (동양; Dongyang; Tongyang)
- Dongyang, Liuyang (洞阳镇), a town in Liuyang city, Hunan province, China

== Organisations ==
- Dong Yang Animation Co., LTD, South Korean animation studio
- Tongyang Group, former South Korean conglomerate
  - Dongyang Cement, South Korean cement company now known as Sampyo Cement
  - Orion Confectionery, established in 1956 as Tongyang Confectionery Corp
- Tongyang Broadcasting Company, former South Korean broadcasting company merged into KBS in 1980
- Dongyang University, university in Yeongju, South Korea

== See also ==
- Dong Yang (born 1983), Chinese football player
- Li Dongyang (1447–1516), Ming Dynasty scholar
