= Sampyo Cement =

Korean Concrete Company

- Hangul: 삼표시멘트
- Hanja: 三票시멘트
- Revised Romanization: Sampyo Simenteu
- McCune–Reischauer: Samp'yo Siment'ŭ

Former name: Tongyang Cement
- Hangul: 동양시멘트
- Hanja: 東洋시멘트
- Revised Romanization: Dongyang Simenteu
- McCune–Reischauer: Tongyang Siment'ŭ

Sampyo Cement (KRX: 038500) is a South Korean cement, concrete and chemical company headquartered in Seoul. It produces portland cement products. It was established in 1957 as Tong Yang Cement by Lee Yang-gu as the second of his many companies which would grow into the Tongyang Group, and was also later known as Tongyang Cement and Energy.

In 1957, Lee used his own capital from money he earned in the confectionery business to acquire a cement factory in Samcheok, Gangwon Province; its owners at the time were eager to sell due to frequent labour disputes and the poor state of the physical plant. That factory had started operations in 1942 under the ownership of Onoda Cement during Japanese colonial rule over Korea. Lee searched out former Onoda engineers in order to rehire them, in particular Oh Pyong-ho, "supposedly the only competent cement engineer in post-colonial South Korea"; Oh accepted the job offer. Lee then began repairs to the facilities with the aid of engineers from Germany's Polysius Company, resolved the labour disputes, and revamped the recruiting programmes; he hired heavily from the local Samcheok High School, and many of his new hires' fathers had worked for Onoda in the past.

Following the Tongyang Group's bankruptcy in September 2013, Tongyang Cement and Energy went into court receivership. The three South Korean conglomerates with the largest ready-mix concrete businesses, namely Aju Group, Eugene Group, and Sampyo Group, all showed interest in acquiring Tongyang Cement in 2014. Among the three, Sampyo Group's bid was successful, and in September 2015, Sampyo Group formally acquired a 45.07% stake in Tongyang Cement, with the Korea Development Bank Sigma Private Equity Fund acquiring another 9.88%, in a ₩794 billion deal. Tongyang Cement and Energy adopted its current name Sampyo Cement in April 2017.

== See also ==
- Economy of South Korea
