= Yukbaeksan =

Mountain in Samcheok, Gangwon-do in South Korea

Seungdusan

Highest point
- Elevation: 1,244.6 m (4,083 ft)

Geography
- Location: South Korea

Korean name
- Hangul: 육백산
- Hanja: 六百山
- RR: Yukbaeksan
- MR: Yukpaeksan

Yukbaeksan (Korean: 육백산) is a mountain in Samcheok, Gangwon Province, South Korea. It has an elevation of 1,244.6 m (4,083 ft).

== See also ==
- List of mountains in Korea
