= Deokhangsan =

Mountain in Samcheok, South Korea

Highest point
- Elevation: 1,070.7 m (3,513 ft)
- Coordinates: 37°19′51″N 129°00′35″E

Geography
- Location: South Korea

Korean name
- Hangul: 덕항산
- Hanja: 德項山
- RR: Deokhangsan
- MR: Tŏkhangsan

Deokhangsan (Korean: 덕항산) is a mountain in Samcheok, Gangwon Province, South Korea. It has an elevation of 1,070.7 m (3,513 ft).

== See also ==
- List of mountains in Korea
