= James A. Van Fleet Award =

Annual award for contributions to Korea-US relations given by The Korea Society

General James A. Van Fleet Award
- Awarded for: Contributions to the promotion of U.S.-Korea relations
- Country: United States; South Korea
- Presented by: The Korea Society
- First award: 1992

The General James A. Van Fleet Award (Korean: 제임스 밴 플리트상), given annually since 1992 by The Korea Society, is awarded to "one or more distinguished Koreans or Americans in recognition of their outstanding contributions to the promotion of U.S.-Korea relations.” It is one of the most prestigious awards in the field of U.S.–Korea relations.

The award is named for General James A. Van Fleet, Commander of the U.S. Eighth Army at the height of the Korean War in 1951. Beginning in 1957, General Van Fleet served as the first president of The Korea Society.

The award is formally presented to the recipient(s) each year at The Korea Society's Annual Dinner.

== Winners ==
- 1995 – Chulsu Kim (Deputy Director-General, World Trade Organization)
- 1996 – Ambassador James T. Laney (U.S. Ambassador to the South Korea)
- 1997 – Pyong-Hwoi Koo (Chairman, Korea International Trade Association)
- 1998 – Jong-Hyon Chey (Chairman, SK Group) and Jeong H. Kim (President, Carrier Networks and DNS / Lucent Technologies)
- 1999 – William J. Perry (former U.S. Secretary of Defense)
- 2000 – Jimmy Carter (former U.S. President)
- 2001 – Kim Kyung Won (President, Institute of Social Sciences)
- 2002 – Horace G. Underwood (Director, Yonsei University)
- 2003 – Raymond G. Davis (Retired General, United States Marine Corps)
- 2004 – Ban Ki-Moon (Minister of Foreign Affairs and Trade, South Korea)
- 2005 – George H. W. Bush (former U.S. President)
- 2006 – Lee Kun-hee (Chairman, Samsung)
- 2007 - Kim Dae-jung (former President of the South Korea) and Houghton and Doreen Freeman (The Freeman Foundation)
- 2008 - Kevin O'Donnell (First Country Director, Peace Corps Korea) and Don Oberdorfer (Chairman, U.S-Korea Institute)
- 2009 - Chung Mong-koo (Chairman, Hyundai Motor Group) and Henry Kissinger (56th Secretary of State, The United States of America)
- 2010 - General Colin Powell (65th Secretary of State, The United States of America) and General Paik Sun-yup (Korean War Veteran, Military of South Korea)
- 2011 - Korea-U.S. Business Council accepted by Hyun Jae-hyun (Chairman of Tongyang Group) and U.S.-Korea Business Council accepted by William R. Rhodes (Senior Vice Chairman of Citigroup and Citibank)
- 2012 - Robert H. Benmosche (President and CEO of American International Group) and Han Duck-soo (former Prime Minister of the South Korea) and Lee Soo-man (Chairman and Founder of S.M. Entertainment)
- 2013 - Ambassadors Ahn Ho-young and Sung Y. Kim on behalf of Korean and U.S. diplomats who have strengthened the 60-year alliance from 1953 to 2013
- 2014 - Marillyn A. Hewson (Chairman, President, and CEO of Lockheed Martin) and Yongmaan Park (Chairman of Doosan Group)
- 2015 - Ho Youn Kim (Founder of Kim Koo Foundation, Chairman and CEO of Binggrae Co., LTD)
- 2016 - Kwon Oh-joon (Chairman and CEO of POSCO)
- 2017 - George W. Bush (former U.S President) and Chey Tae-won (Chairman and CEO of SK Holdings)
- 2018 - Sohn Kyung Shik (Chairman of CJ Group)
- 2019 - The Boeing Company and Cho Yang-ho (Chairman and CEO of Korean Air)
- 2020 - Charles B. Rangel (Congressman and Korean War Veteran), Salvatore Scarlato (President of Korean War Veterans Association and Korean War Veteran), Yongmaan Park (Chairman of Korea Chamber of Commerce and Industry), BTS (Global Superstars)
- 2021 - Koo Kwang-mo (Chairman of LG Group), Mary Barra (CEO of General Motors)
