= Samcheok Line =

Railway line in South Korea

Overview
- Native name: 삼척선(三陟線)
- Status: Operational
- Owner: Korea Rail Network Authority
- Locale: Gangwon (South Korea)
- Termini: Donghae; Samcheok
- Stations: 4

Service
- Type: Heavy rail, Passenger/Freight; Regional rail
- Operator(s): Korail

History
- Opened: 1944; 82 years ago

Technical
- Line length: 12.9 km (8.0 mi)
- Number of tracks: Single track
- Track gauge: 1,435 mm (4 ft 8 1/2 in) standard gauge
- Electrification: 25 kV/60 Hz AC Overhead line

- Samcheok Line
- Hangul: 삼척선
- Hanja: 三陟線
- RR: Samcheokseon
- MR: Samch'ŏksŏn

The Samcheok Line (Korean: 삼척선) is a line of Korail. It connects Donghae in Gangwon Province with Samcheok in Gangwon Province.

== History ==
When the construction of the Cheoram Line (current Yeongdong Line and Mukhohang Line) was carried out by Samcheok Railway Company between the construction sections of the Donghae Nambu Line and Donghae Bukbu Line, construction of some sections along with the introduction line to the Onoda Cement Samcheok Plant was started in 1939 and opened from Bukpyeong to Samcheok on 11 February 1944.

The line was electrified on January 1, 2025, and began direct service with Donghae Line.

== See also ==
- Transportation in South Korea
