= Geunsan =

Mountain in Samcheok, South Korea

Highest point
- Elevation: 504.8 m (1,656 ft)

Geography
- Location: South Korea

Korean name
- Hangul: 근산
- Hanja: 近山
- RR: Geunsan
- MR: Kŭnsan

Geunsan (Korean: 근산) is a mountain in Samcheok, Gangwon Province, South Korea. It has an elevation of 504.8 m (1,656 ft).

== See also ==
- List of mountains in Korea
