= Samcheok station =

Railway station in Gangwon-do, South Korea

삼척
Samcheok
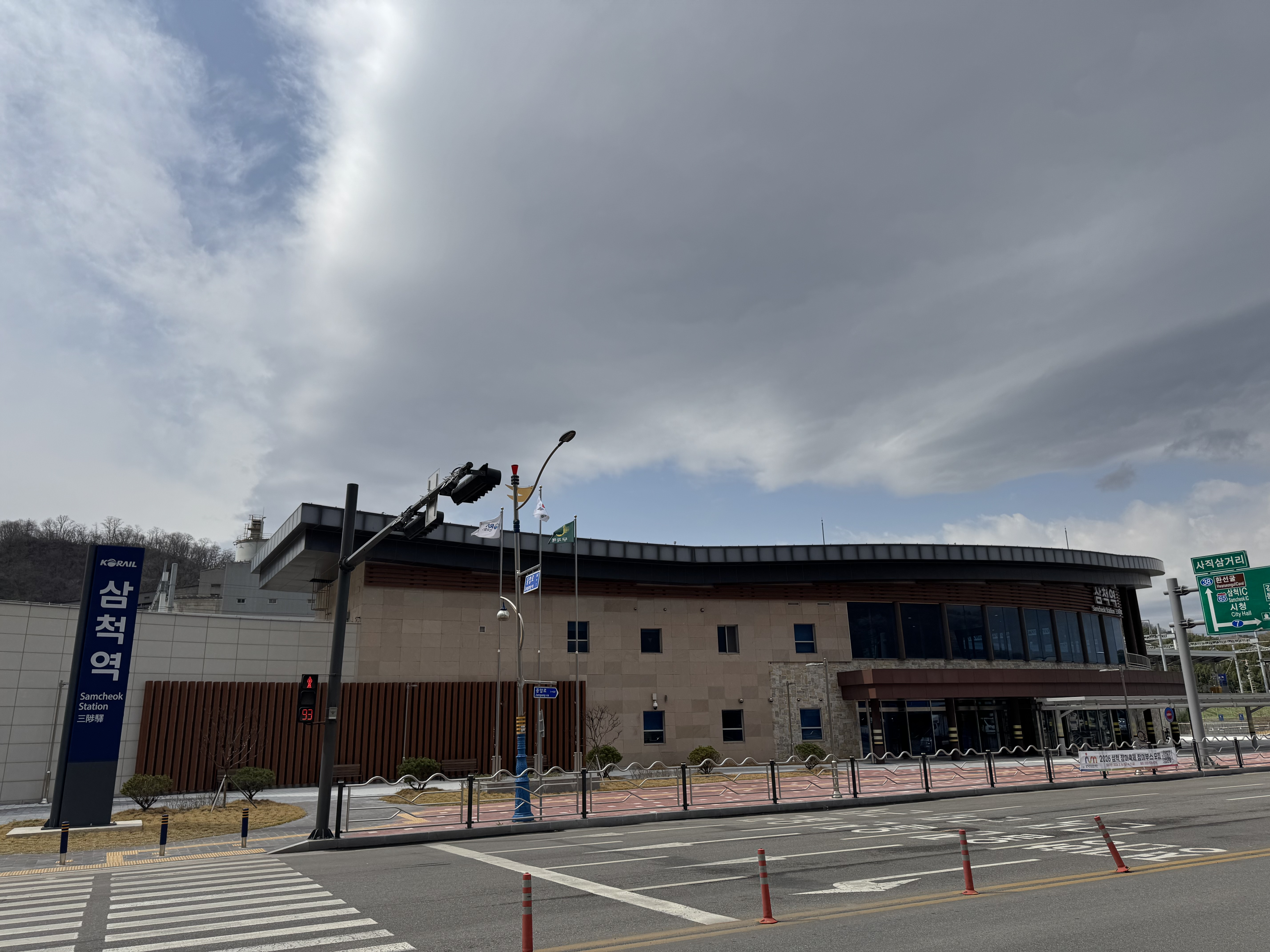
- Station building

Korean name
- Hangul: 삼척역
- Hanja: 三陟驛
- Revised Romanization: Samcheongnyeok
- McCune–Reischauer: Samch'ŏngnyŏk

General information
- Location: Sajik-dong, Samcheok, Gangwon; South Korea
- Coordinates: 37°25′47.74″N 129°10′43.4″E
- Operator: Korail
- Lines: Donghae Line; Samcheok Line
- Platforms: 1
- Tracks: 2

Construction
- Structure type: Aboveground

History
- Opened: February 11, 1944
- Original company: Samcheok Railway
Location

Samcheok Station is a railway station on the Donghae Line and the Samcheok Line in South Korea.

== History ==
- February 11, 1944: Commencing operations as a regular station
- June 13, 1958: Construction of the new station is completed.
- September 10, 1971: Designated anthracite cargo arrival station
- July 1, 1983: Changed to class 6 station, abolished Samcheok-Gangneung passenger train (one passenger car connected behind freight train)
- August 20, 1991: Passengers suspended.
- January 1, 1994: Stop Baggage cars.
- July 24, 2007: Resuming passenger handling.
- June 3, 2019: Passengers suspended.
- January 1, 2025: Passengers resume handling.
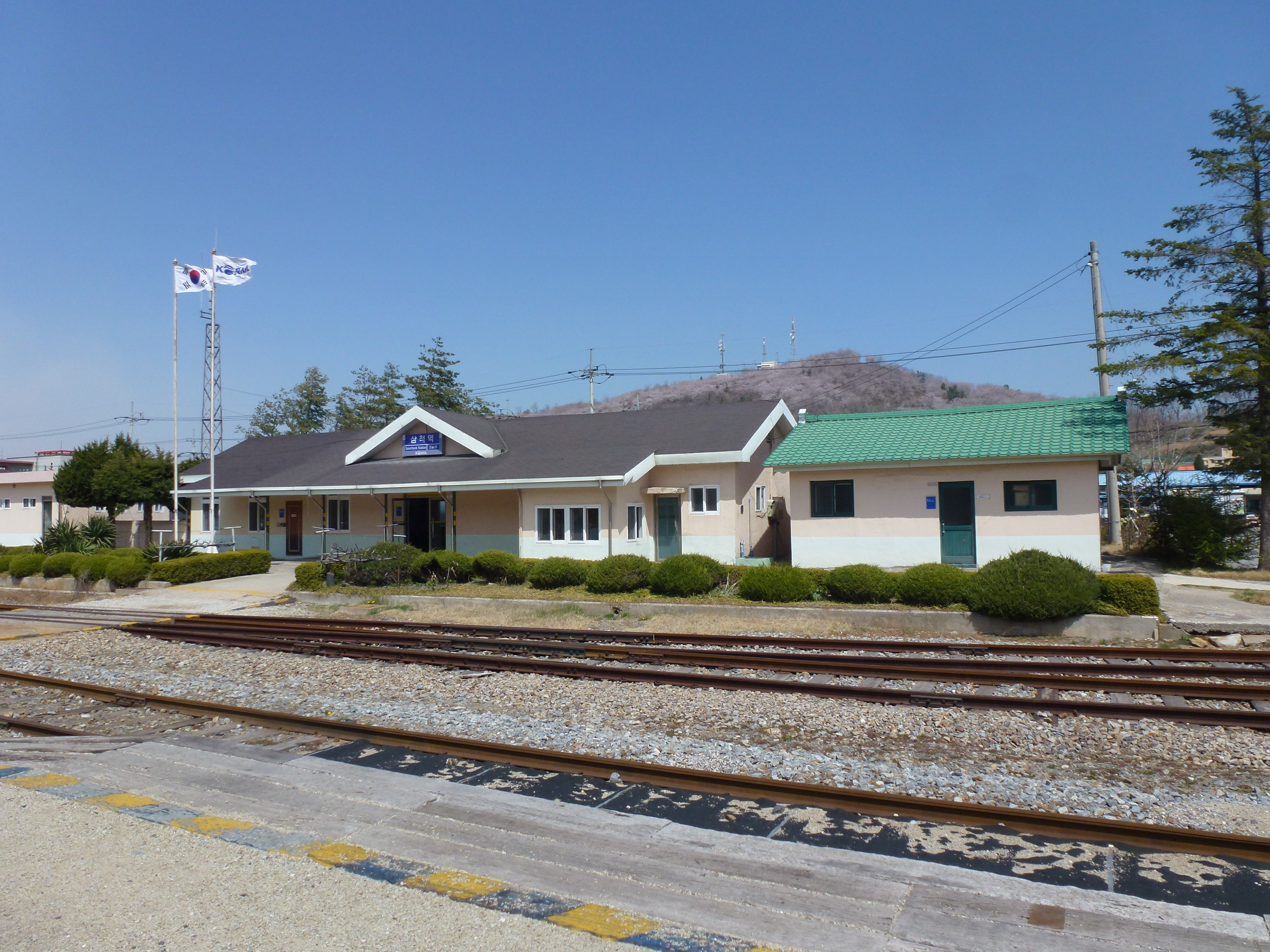
Old building (April 2013)
