= Samcheok Railway =

Japanese company in colonial Korea

Samcheok Railway Co. Ltd.
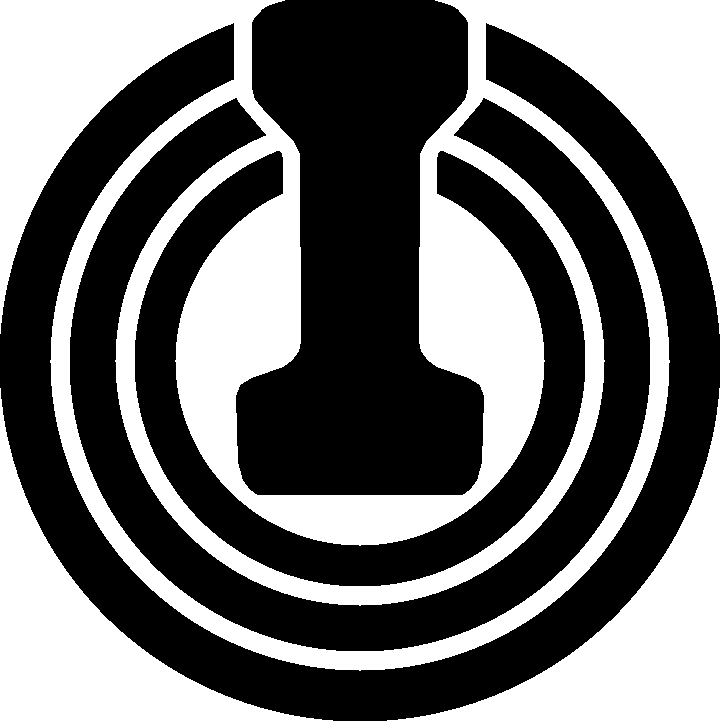

Overview
- Native name: 삼척철도주식회사 (Samcheok Cheoldo Jusikhoesa) 三陟鐵道株式會社 (Sanchoku Tetsudō Kabushiki Kaisha)

The Samcheok Railway (Japanese: 三陟鐵道株式會社, Sanchoku Tetsudō Kabushiki Kaisha; Korean: 삼척철도주식회사, Samcheok Cheoldo Jusikhoesa), was a privately owned railway company in Japanese-occupied Korea.

The first 41.4 km (25.7 mi) section of the line (Mukho Port–Dogye) was opened on 31 July 1940. The line was named Cheoram Line, which ran from Mukho, a port on Korea's east coast that became part of Donghae in 1980, to Cheoram in the Taebaek Mountains, to develop three coal fields. Between Simpo-ri and Tong-ri stations, the great height difference was scaled by a steep double-track railway. Freight railcars going up and down were connected to the same cable, passengers had to walk up the mountain. On 1 August 1940, a branch from Bukpyeong (today Donghae Station) to Mukho bypassing Mukho Port was opened, and the original alignment became the Mukho Port Line (ko); this was followed by a 12.9 km (8.0 mi) branch from Bukpyeong to Samcheok, the Samcheok Line (ko), that was opened on 11 February 1944.

After the partition of Korea the Samcheok Railway's network was entirely within the territory of South Korea, and the company was nationalised on 10 August 1948 and made part of the Korean National Railroad. The Cheoram Line became part of the KNR's Yeongdong Line in 1963, whilst the Samcheok Line remained a separate line. The Samcheok Railway's network was isolated from the rest of Korea's railways, and remained so until 1955.

== Motive Power ==
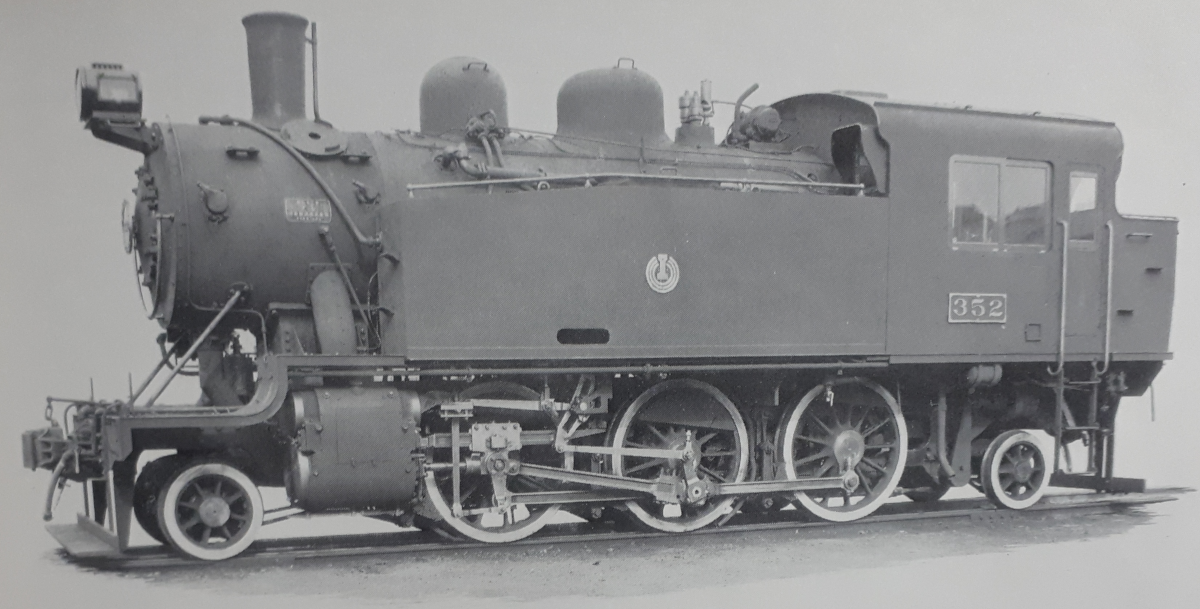
Steam locomotive 352 of the Samcheok Railway.

Amongst other locomotives, the Samcheok Railway operated two 2-6-2T tank locomotives built by Kisha Seizō of Japan for the railway in 1938; the company designated them the 350 series, numbered 350 and 351.

== Network ==
鐵岩線 - 철암선 - Teggan Line - Cheoram Line
Distance		Station name					
Total; km	S2S; km	Transcribed, Korean	Transcribed, Japanese	Hunminjeongeum	Hanja/Kanji	Opening date	Connections
0.0	0.0	Mukho	Mokko	묵호	墨湖	31 July 1940	Mukho Port Line
6.0	6.0	Bukpyeong	Hokuhei	북평	北坪	31 July 1940	Samcheok Line, Mukho Port Line
13.5	7.5	Dogyeongni	Tōkyōri	도경리	桃京里	31 July 1940	
17.1	3.6	Miro	Mirō	미로	未老	31 July 1940	
21.8	4.7	Sangjeong	Shanchō	상정	上鼎	31 July 1940	
27.0	5.2	Singi	Shinki	신기	新基	31 July 1940	
32.4	5.4	Machari	Majiri	마차리	馬次里	31 July 1940	
35.9	3.5	Hagosari	Kakoshiri	하고사리	下古士里	31 July 1940	
37.6	1.7	Gosari	Koshiri	고사리	古士里	31 July 1940	
42.3	4.7	Dogye	Dōkei	도계	道溪	31 July 1940	
45.6	3.3	Nahanjeong	Rakanjō	나한정	羅漢亭	31 July 1940	
47.1	1.5	Heungjeon	Kyōden	흥전	興田	31 July 1940	
51.1	4.0	Simpori	Shinpori	심포리	深浦里	31 July 1940	
58.8	7.7	Tongni	Tōni	통리	桶里	31 July 1940	
61.9	3.1	Dongbaeksan	Tōhakusan	동백산	東栢山	31 July 1940	
63.7	1.8	Baeksan	Hakusan	백산	栢山	31 July 1940	
68.0	4.3	Cheoram	Teggan	철암	鐵岩	31 July 1940	

墨湖港線 - 철암선 - Mokkokō Line - Mukhohang Line
Distance		Station name					
Total; km	S2S; km	Transcribed, Korean	Transcribed, Japanese	Hunminjeongeum	Hanja/Kanji	Opening date	Connections
0.0	0.0	Mukho	Mokko	묵호	墨湖	1 August 1940	Cheoram Line
0.8	0.8	Mukhohang (Mukho Port)	Mokkokō	묵호항	墨湖港	1 August 1940	
5.9	5.1	Bukpyeong	Hokuhei	북평	北坪	1 August 1940	Samcheok Line, Cheoram Line

三陟線 - 삼척선 - Sanchoku Line - Samcheok Line
Distance		Station name					
Total; km	S2S; km	Transcribed, Korean	Transcribed, Japanese	Hunminjeongeum	Hanja/Kanji	Opening date	Connections
0.0	0.0	Bukpyeong	Hokuhei	북평	北坪	1 August 1940	Mukho Port Line, Cheoram Line
6.4	6.4	Chuam	Shūgan	추암	湫岩	11 February 1944	
7.8	1.4	Samcheok Haebyeon	Sanchoku Kaihen	삼척해변	三陟海邊	11 February 1944	
12.9	5.1	Samcheok	Sanchoku	삼척	三陟	11 February 1944	
