= KNR Pureo7-300 class locomotives =

2-6-2 steam locomotive

Samcheok Railway 350 series Korean National Railroad Pureo7-300 class (푸러7-300)
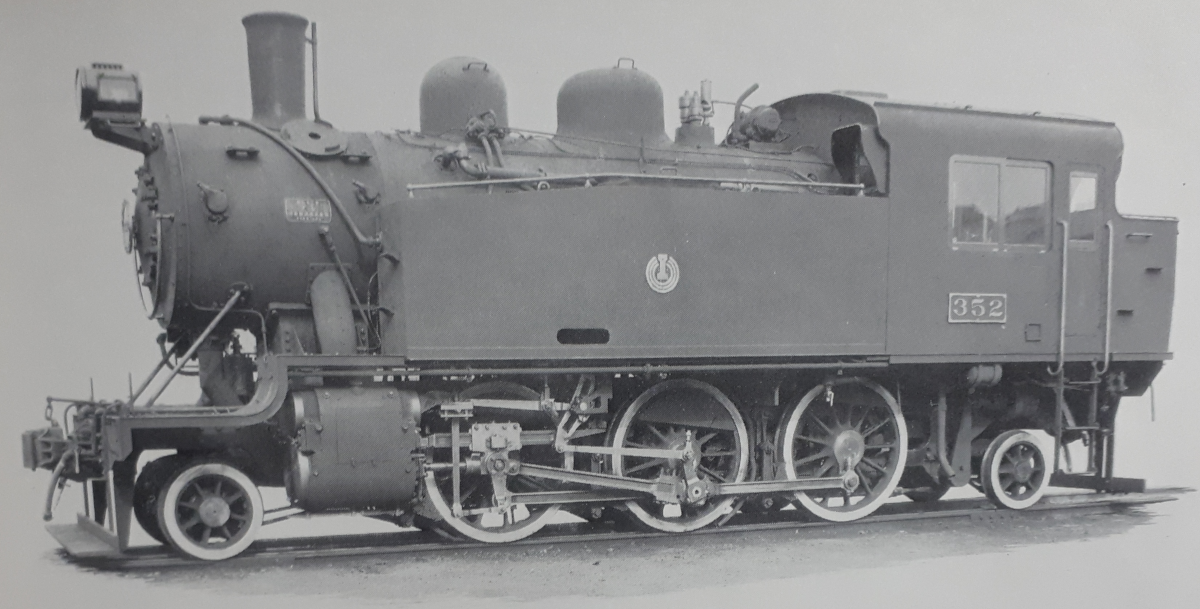
- Builder's photo of Samcheok Railway no. 352
Type and origin
- Power type: Steam
- Builder: Kisha Seizō
- Build date: 1938
- Total produced: 2
Specifications
- Configuration
  - Whyte: 2-6-2T
- Gauge: 1,435 mm (4 ft 8 1/2 in)
Career
- Operators: Samcheok Railway; Korean National Railroad
- Class: CGR: 350; KNR: 푸러7-300
- Number in class: 2
- Numbers: CGR: 351-352; KNR: 푸러7-351 – 푸러7-352
- Delivered: 1938

The Pureo7-300 class (Korean: 푸러7-300) was a class consisting of steam tank locomotives with 2-6-2 wheel arrangement operated by the Korean National Railroad in South Korea. The "Pureo" name came from the American naming system for steam locomotives, under which locomotives with 2-6-2 wheel arrangement were called "Prairie".

In all, the Chosen Government Railway owned 227 locomotives of all Pure classes, whilst privately owned railways owned another 52 - including these; of these 279 locomotives, 169 went to the Korean National Railroad in South Korea and 110 to the Korean State Railway in North Korea.

The Samcheok Railway, a privately owned railway in the east-central part of colonial-era Korea, received two 2-6-2T tank locomotive built by Kisha Seizō of the Japan in 1938, works numbers 1544 and 1545, which it numbered 351 and 352. After the Liberation and partition of Korea, all railways in South Korea were nationalised, and these locomotives were taken up by the new Korean National Railroad, which designated the class 푸러7-300 (Pureo7-300) class and numbered the locomotives 푸러7-351 and 푸러7-352.
