= Eugene Group =

Korean family-owned conglomerate

- Hangul: 유진그룹
- Hanja: 有進그룹
- Revised Romanization: Yujin Geurup
- McCune–Reischauer: Yujin Kŭrup

Eugene Group (Korean: 유진그룹) is a large South Korean chaebol (conglomerate), producing industry, media, construction, and confectionery products that was founded in 1954. It also has subsidiaries that provide financial, IT, advertising, broadcasting, logistics, and food services. In addition, it operates a couple golf courses and home improvement stores.

== Subsidiaries ==
- Eugene Concrete
- Eugene Basic Materials Company
- Tongyang Inc.
- Eugene Total Development Company
- Dream City (Eugene Group)
- Eugene Dream Networks
- Eugene Broadband Solutions
- Eugene IT Service
- EM Media
- Korea Logistics
- Purunsol Golf Club
- Yeongyang Confectionery
- Eugene Investment & Securities
- Eugene Asset Management
- Eugene Investment & Futures
- Eugene Private Equity
- Eugene Savings Bank
- Ace Home Center, partnered with Ace Hardware
- Home Day, a home improvement retailer

== See also ==
- List of Korean companies
- Chaebol
- Economy of South Korea
