= Eugene Basic Materials Company =

South Korean chemical manufacturing company specializing in slag and cement

- Hangul: 유진기초소재주식회사
- Hanja: 유진基礎소재株式會社
- Revised Romanization: Yujin Gichosojae Jusikhoesa
- McCune–Reischauer: Yujin Kich'osojae Chusikhoesa

Eugene Basic Materials Company is a South Korean chemical manufacturing company specializing in slag and cement. It is headquartered in Susong-dong, Jongno-gu, Seoul. It is a member of the Eugene Group of companies, and was established in 1999.

The CEO is Choi Jeong Ho (최정호).

== Products ==
The company is a manufacturer of slag powder, cement and aggregate products. Its manufacturing facilities are located in Manseok-dong, Dong-gu, Incheon.

- Blast Furnace Slag (Ground Granulated, Cement, Low-Heat, Alkali)
- Non-Explosive Demolition Agent
- ALFA (Artificial Light-weight Fine Aggregate)

== See also ==
- Eugene Group
- Eugene Concrete
- Chaebol
- Economy of South Korea
- List of South Korean companies
