= Hyun Jae-hyun =

South Korean businessman (born 1949)

Hyun Jae-Hyun
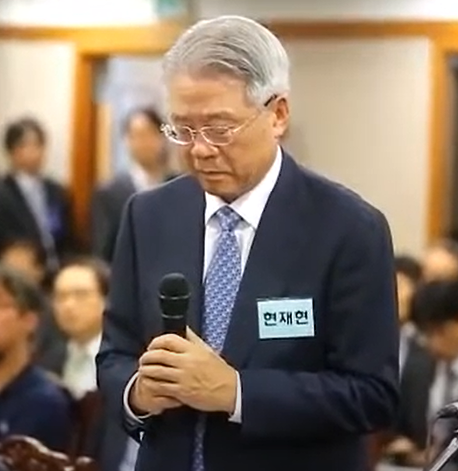
- Born: February 12, 1949 (age 77)
- Citizenship: South Korea

Korean name
- Hangul: 현재현
- Hanja: 玄在賢
- RR: Hyeon Jaehyeon
- MR: Hyŏn Chaehyŏn

Hyun Jae-Hyun (born February 12, 1949) is chairman of Tongyang Group, a South Korean conglomerate founded in 1957 as a cement manufacturer.

== Career ==
Starting in the mid-1980s, Hyun began diversifying the Tongyang Group's business structure, and by 1989, he re-introduced Tongyang into the business community as a finance-based service provider. Today, in addition to being the second largest cement manufacturer in Korea, Tongyang offers a comprehensive range of financial services that include securities brokerage, investment banking, asset management and life insurance. He was arrested on January 14, 2014, on suspicions of fraudulent sales of corporate bonds and commercial papers.

In 2014 he was jailed for 12 years for fraud.

== Personal life and other activities ==
In 1993, Hyun became the president of the Korean Baduk Association, a South Korean non-profit which aims to promote the game Go (known as baduk in Korean). He lives in Seoul with his wife and four children.
