= Save Me (webtoon) =

2019 webtoon by Big Hit Entertainment and LICO

- The poster for Save Me

화양연화 pt. 0 <SAVE ME> RR: Hwayangyeonhwa pt. 0 <SAVE ME> MR: Hwayangyŏnhwa pt. 0 <SAVE ME>
- Genre: Young adult; Fantasy; Science fiction; Melodrama
- Author: Big Hit Entertainment
- Illustrator: Studio LICO
- Publisher: Naver
- English publisher: Naver
- Magazine: Naver Webtoon (original Korean); WEBTOON (official English translation)
- Original run: January 17 – April 11, 2019

Save Me (Korean: 화양연화 pt.0 <SAVE ME>; Hanja: 花樣年華 pt. 0 <SAVE ME>; lit. 'The Most Beautiful Moment in Life, Pt. 0: SAVE ME') is a South Korean webtoon collaboratively produced by Big Hit Entertainment and Naver Webtoon's digital content subsidiary Studio LICO. A namesake of South Korean boy band BTS's 2016 song "Save Me", it ran from January 17 to April 11, 2019, consisting of 15 episodes plus one prologue.

The central characters of Save Me are the alter egos of the band's seven members, each named after each band member's real name. The webtoon tells the story of protagonist Kim Seok-jin who is trapped in a time loop, repeatedly reliving his life starting from April 11, from which he can escape only when he accomplishes the task of saving his six best friends from their destined miseries.

Save Me is part of Big Hit Entertainment's BTS Universe (BU), an alternate universe revolving around most of BTS' output. It is available in six official languages (including Korean and English) and fan translations. Met with mostly positive response from WEBTOON readers, it amassed 50 million views at its conclusion.

== Background and concept ==
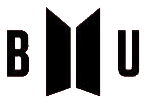
Logo for BTS Universe

Save Me is a part of the BTS Universe (also known as Bangtan Universe or BU), an alternate universe created by Big Hit Entertainment that winds through the output of K-pop idol group BTS, starting with The Most Beautiful Moment in Life series. Big Hit Entertainment provided the webtoon's story while Studio LICO, a Naver Webtoon subsidiary, adapted and incorporated the story into Save Me. Its plot parallels that of the images portrayed in the group's music videos and in other related content such as their book HYYH: The Notes 1. The title of the webtoon references to BTS' 2016 single "Save Me" from The Most Beautiful Moment in Life: Young Forever.

The webtoon is composed of 16 parts: a short "prologue", showing the context of the story, and 15 episodes. Each of its seven central characters are named after each band member's real name and have backstories exclusive to the universe only so as not to confuse their identities with their real-life counterparts.

The release of Save Me was also teased in Big Hit Entertainment's Smeraldo Books Twitter account, wherein short video clips were uploaded along with short notes excerpted from HYYH: The Notes 1. The Smeraldo Books itself is part of the BTS Universe, its name alluding to the song "The Truth Untold" from Love Yourself: Tear.

== Plot ==
=== Episodes 1–4 ===
It doesn't matter. If I could turn back time, if I could straighten out the errors and mistakes and make us all happy again like we used to be, I would do anything.

— Kim Seok-jin
Save Me Episode 1

Seok-jin returns to South Korea after a two-year stay in the United States. Filled with nostalgia, he reminisces the good memories he had with his six friends from school—Yoon-gi, Ho-seok, Nam-joon, Ji-min, Tae-hyung and Jung-kook—who have gone to their separate ways since two years ago. One day, while driving on April 11, he sees Jung-kook crossing the street on his way to school and, later at night, he sees Nam-joon working at a petrol station, but he does not make any attempt to approach each of them.

More than a month later, Seok-jin wakes up from a nightmare (Note: In his nightmare, Seok-jin sees himself and his six friends underwater. Seok-jin's six friends are drowning and inevitably drifting away, while Seok-jin is reaching out in vain, unable to rescue them.) and decides to reconnect with his friends. He returns to the petrol station, only to find out that Nam-joon is already in prison for assaulting a customer. He pays Nam-joon a visit at the detention center, and learns that Nam-joon was caught in a fight with a snobbish customer on the night of April 11, right after Seok-jin left the station. To his shock, Seok-jin also learns from Nam-joon the deaths of Jung-kook and Yoon-gi and that Ho-seok is in the hospital while Tae-hyung and Ji-min's whereabouts remain unknown. After the visitation, Seok-jin witnesses Tae-hyung being brought into police custody and mobbed by reporters.

Seok-jin goes to the beach, mourning over his loss and wishing he could turn back time and fix everything. There, he hears a mysterious voice and he sees a small white creature (Note: Presumably, the creature appears to be a small white dog.) running past him. He wakes up and finds himself back on the morning of April 11, thinking it was all a dream. Like before, he goes at night to the petrol station where Nam-joon works and ignores him. Just as he was thinking he should have approached Nam-joon, a boy falls onto his car, instantly dead upon impact. Realizing in horror that it was Jung-kook, his vision blurs and he wakes up back to the morning of April 11. As he begins reliving once again the events of that day, he now senses that something strange is happening to him. After visiting the petrol station, he decides to stop his car and walk around the neighborhood. In time, Jung-kook falls from a building and lands dead on the street right behind Seok-jin, on the spot where the latter's car was supposed to be on (from the preceding iteration).

Seok-jin rescuing Jung-kook in a scene from Episode 4

A voice wakes Seok-jin back to April 11, temporarily showing him in bits the fates of his friends and revealing to him his own: that he shall be trapped in a time loop, from which he must escape by saving his six friends from their miseries. Realizing that he had really gone back in time (albeit already more than once), he resolves to fix his friend's fates and reunite their group. He starts by stopping Nam-joon from attacking the snobbish customer, whom he talked out easily. Before leaving for the next location, he tells Nam-joon that he is going to find Jung-kook right away.

While feeling weird about the gravity of what Seok-jin had told him, Nam-joon sees Jung-kook walking alone on the streets. Sensing incoming danger, he runs after Jung-kook but he loses sight of the boy through the thick crowd of pedestrians. Meanwhile, Seok-jin is also in search of Jung-kook while trying to recall which building rooftop the boy will fall from. After climbing up the wrong building and deducing the correct one, he rushes at the last minutes. On the street, Nam-joon finds Jung-kook standing on the building rooftop's parapet. Just as Jung-kook loses his footing, Seok-jin had reached the rooftop and pulls him back to safety.

=== Episodes 5–8 ===
Seok-jin and Nam-joon ask Jung-kook how he ended up in the building rooftop. Suddenly, Jung-kook receives a phone call from Yoon-gi's number. The trio rushes to the hospital and witness the doctors trying to revive Yoon-gi, who was rescued from his burning hotel room. Unfortunately, Yoon-gi ultimately perishes; at once, Seok-jin is transported back to the morning of April 11.

Seok-jin repeats his rescuing of Nam-joon and Jung-kook, this time making it earlier so that Nam-joon will not have to meet the snobbish customer and Jung-kook will not have to go to the building rooftop. As Seok-jin leaves to rescue Yoon-gi, Nam-joon receives a call from the police station. There, he and Jung-kook retrieve Tae-hyung, who was caught making trouble. Upon being asked if he knew Yoon-gi's whereabouts, Tae-hyung reveals, rather jokingly, that he saw Yoon-gi in his "dreams."

Seok-jin rescuing Yoon-gi from the fire in a scene from Episode 7

Meanwhile, Seok-jin is at a hotel scanning the security footages for signs of Yoon-gi, only to find out that he had gone to the wrong building. A nearby building catches fire and Seok-jin is sent back to the morning of April 11 once again. On this next trial, Seok-jin brings Nam-joon, Jung-kook and Tae-hyung with him right after waking up, significantly earlier than the previous iterations, to help in his search for Yoon-gi. In response to this sudden change of fates, the four men are caught in a vehicular accident; Nam-joon, Jung-kook and Tae-hyung are killed while Seok-jin is seriously injured. As the loop starts again, Seok-jin realizes that he must not quickly jump in to change his friends' fates.

Back to the start of the loop, Seok-jin begins planning his rescues. Seok-jin concludes that he must let Nam-joon meet the snobbish customer and stop the fight at the right moment, and leave Nam-joon by himself while he goes to rescue Jung-kook, taking the shortest distance possible. Proceeding as planned, Seok-jin rushes to the burning building to save Yoon-gi. Upon regaining consciousness in the hospital, Yoon-gi expresses his resentment at Seok-jin for saving him from the fire.

A month later, Tae-hyung is caught in the act of vandalism and evades the police by hiding in Nam-joon's pad. While spending the night at Nam-joon's, Tae-hyung wakes up from a nightmare in which he saw Ji-min. (Note: Tae-hyung's nightmare is rather similar to that of Seok-jin's: both nightmares were set underwater. In Tae-hyung's nightmare, he sees himself plunging into the water. Looking around, he sees a drowning Ji-min and tries to reach out to him, but he sees another person holding on to Ji-min's left foot as if it was pulling Ji-min deeper into the water. The other person is revealed to be a second Ji-min.) Both Nam-joon and Tae-hyung are unaware that Ji-min has been in staying in a hospital for two years. In the hospital, Ji-min meets Ho-seok who is recently confined for his narcolepsy. Ji-min confides to Ho-seok that his "clock stopped clicking at some point": he cannot say how long had he been in the hospital and how much longer must he stay. Ji-min has also been haunted by images of a tunnel and a sign pointing to an arboretum.

Meanwhile, Nam-joon and Tae-hyung decide to visit Ho-seok at his job, but learns later on that he had been brought to the hospital due to his narcolepsy. At the hospital, Ho-seok overhears a group a hospital staff talking about Ji-min and learns that Ji-min had actually been forced by his parents to stay in the hospital.

=== Episodes 9–12 ===
Nam-joon and Tae-hyung, accompanied by Jung-kook and Yoon-gi, who was discharged a month ago, arrive at the hospital to pay Ho-seok a visit. Ho-seok learns of their arrival and invites Ji-min to join him in meeting their friends, but Ji-min refuses and asks him not to tell them that he is in the hospital. Later, Nam-joon excuses himself from the group to go back to his work.

Seok-jin and Ho-seok in a scene from Episode 11

Upon exiting the hospital, Nam-joon meets Seok-jin who he thought was also going to visit Ho-seok. Seok-jin, who had just learned of Yoon-gi's discharge, realizes Ho-seok was also in the hospital upon his encounter with Nam-joon. On the next day, he returns to the hospital to see Ho-seok but he runs into Ji-min instead. Just in time, hospital staffs rush by Seok-jin and Ji-min, transporting a dying Ho-seok who fell down the stairs. Seok-jin is then transported back to the morning of April 11, restarting the loop once again.

Seok-jin proceeds to redo his rescues; this time, he finds Ho-seok on a bridge under the influence of a narcolepsy attack and catches him as he loses consciousness, thus preventing Ho-seok from being sent to the hospital. Ho-seok recuperates in Seok-jin's car and requests to be dropped off at his work. Before he gets off the car, Ho-seok notices five sticky notes attached to the dashboard, written on which are his, Nam-joon, Jung-kook, Yoon-gi, and Ji-min's names and the places where each would supposedly meet their ill fate.

Confused, Ho-seok meets Nam-joon, asking about Seok-jin's strange behavior. He later manages to follow Seok-jin to the burning building, and is shocked to see Seok-jin emerge from the building carrying Yoon-gi. Recalling the notes in Seok-jin's car, Ho-seok interrogates Seok-jin, but the latter refuses to reveal the truth. While waiting in the hospital for Yoon-gi to recover, Ho-seok comes across Ji-min, who tells him how he had been locked up in the hospital for a very long time.

Upon Ji-min's wish to escape from the hospital, Ho-seok enlists the help of Nam-joon and Tae-hyung. Seok-jin proceeds to rescuing Ji-min, but he runs instead into Ho-seok, Nam-joon and Tae-hyung who were already bringing Ji-min with them. Fearing it would put them all to jeopardy, Seok-jin refuses to help his friends in breaking Ji-min out of the hospital. In a brief altercation, Ho-seok reveals to Seok-jin the truth of Ji-min's misery; Seok-jin finally leads the group in the escape, but they are caught by Ji-min's mother. Ji-min pleads for his discharge but he gets slapped and rejected by his mother. Days after the failed rescue, Ji-min is found in a locked bathroom, nearly drowning inside a bathtub overflowing with water.

=== Episodes 13–15 ===
The hospital staffs unlock the door to the bathroom; Seok-jin rushes into the room and saves Ji-min from drowning. At the latter's imploring, Seok-jin breaks Ji-min out of the hospital and escapes by car, but as the two pass through a tunnel, Ji-min begins to feel uncomfortable. Seeing the arboretum sign ahead of them, Ji-min panics and rushes out of the car. Seok-jin is sent back once again to the start of the time loop.

Exhausted over his successive failures, Seok-jin refuses to relive his life and save his friends, and he spends the time loop sulking inside his room. Unexpectedly, Tae-hyung visits Seok-jin on the next iteration, motivating Seok-jin to continue in the challenge of rescuing his friends and escaping the loop. Seok-jin proceeds to saving Nam-joon, Jung-kook, Ho-seok, Yoon-gi and Ji-min in the safest way possible. As the seven best friends celebrate their reunion, Seok-jin fails to notice that he still has one friend left to be saved from his ill fate: Tae-hyung.

Tae-hyung mourning over Seok-jin's body in a scene from Episode 15

Meanwhile, Tae-hyung remains secretive to his friends about his family issues: he and his older sister are being tormented since childhood by their abusive and alcoholic father. Upon arriving at their apartment home, Tae-hyung finds his father in his drunken tantrum. As their father beat up his older sister, Tae-hyung, blinded with rage, grabs an empty liquor bottle and is shown charging towards his father. Just as Nam-joon was telling Seok-jin his worries on Tae-hyung's family life, Ho-seok arrives to bring word on Tae-hyung's arrest. Seok-jin rushes to the police station and sees Tae-hyung being escorted by the police and surrounded by reporters—Tae-hyung had killed his father. As the time loop restarts again, Seok-jin resolves to advance with his final rescue, vowing to himself that he must not fail again.

After saving the first five friends as before, Seok-jin finds Tae-hyung and offers him a drive home. While inside the car, Tae-hyung declines confiding his family problems. Instead, he reveals having recurring dreams about their friends' ill fates. Tae-hyung describes them in exact detail—Yoon-gi's arson, Jung-kook falling from a building, Ho-seok's accident, Ji-min locked up in the hospital, and Nam-joon's imprisonment—to which Seok-jin is inwardly surprised. He reveals he had also seen himself in his dreams but, once he wakes up, he is unable to recall what happened to him in the dream.

As the two arrive at an apartment, both hear an angry voice seeming to come from Tae-hyung's dad. Sensing his father's tantrum, Tae-hyung rushes to the apartment with Seok-jin tailing behind him. Seeing his older sister being beaten up by their father, the enraged Tae-hyung strikes his father down with an empty liquor bottle, which broke at the sheer force. As Tae-hyung aims the broken bottle at his father to kill him, Seok-jin intervenes and takes the fatal stab.

While Tae-hyung mourns over his dying body, Seok-jin wonders if he had eventually ended all of his friends' miseries. He opens his eyes and finds himself back home in his bedroom on April 11, the start of the loop. He realizes that he cannot save his friends and escape from the time loop all by himself. While holding a photo of their group, Seok-jin sees petals showering on him. With realization of the possibly new chance given to him, he concludes on how he could escape his destiny and prevent those of his friends:

Once again, just like before ... together with you...

== Characters ==
=== Main ===
- Kim Seok-jin

Named after and based from BTS' Jin, Kim Seok-jin is the protagonist and narrator of Save Me, and is the prime mover of the story's plot. He became friends with Nam-joon, Jung-kook, Yoon-gi, Ho-seok, Ji-min and Tae-hyung when all seven of them received detention for being late to school and is the oldest among the group. After their group's separation, he stays in the United States and returns home two years later, only to find his friends plunged into their own miseries. In his wish to reunite with his six best friends, he gets trapped in a time loop, from which he could escape only if he could save all six of his friends from their ill fates. He repeatedly relives his life starting April 11, learning the rules of the time loop in each iteration to bring all of his seven together. In the last episode, he is killed in a struggle with Tae-hyung, who has turned murderous against his own father due to violence in the family.

- Kim Nam-joon

Named after and based from BTS' RM, Kim Nam-joon is one of Seok-jin's best friends, the fourth eldest among the seven young men. After their group went separate ways two years prior the events of the story, Nam-joon began working in a petrol station. There, he is destined to meet a rude and arrogant customer who will trigger him into fighting back and, consequently, upon his refusal to settle, he will be put behind bars for assaulting the customer. He is the first to be saved by Seok-jin from his ill fate. He lives in a container house; he is particularly close to Tae-hyung, who would usually hide in his house to escape from the police.

- Jeon Jung-kook

Named after and based from BTS' Jungkook, Jeon Jung-kook is the youngest of Seok-jin's best friends. He is having problems with his indifferent stepfamily, but at school he became friends with Seok-jin, Nam-joon, Jung-kook, Yoon-gi, Ho-seok, Ji-min and Tae-hyung. He became closer, especially, with Yoon-gi who had saved him from being beaten up by a teacher, leading to Yoon-gi getting expelled from school. He is destined to be beaten up by strangers and fall to his death from a building. He is the second to be rescued from his ill fate after Nam-joon.

- Min Yoon-gi

Named after and based from BTS' Suga, Min Yoon-gi is one of Seok-jin's best friends, the second eldest among the seven young men. He is expelled from school when he fought a teacher who was about to beat Jung-kook up. He is pursuing music but is met with opposition by his father. He is destined to die after setting fire to his motel room due to his suicidal thoughts. He is the third to be rescued after Jung-kook.

- Jung Ho-seok

Named after and based from BTS' J-Hope, Jung Ho-seok is one of Seok-jin's best friends, the third eldest among the seven young men. He is afflicted by narcolepsy since childhood, and he would sometimes collapse and injure himself during narcoleptic attacks. He became an orphan after being abandoned by his mother at a theme park. Among his friends, he is especially close to Ji-min. Despite his narcolepsy, he is working in a fast food restaurant. He is supposed to be confined in a hospital where he shall met his fate due to falling down a flight of stairs after mistaking a woman for his mother. He is the fourth to be rescued after Yoon-gi.

- Park Ji-min

Named after and based from BTS' Jimin, Park Ji-min is one of Seok-jin's best friends, the third youngest among the seven young men. He is fated to be indefinitely, perhaps forever, confined in a hospital when his parents gave up on him due to him suffering from seizures. He is traumatized by his parents' neglect and the mere fact of him being locked up in the hospital. He would frequently see dark images of his younger self, of a tunnel and of an arboretum, which could be linked to his painful past. As a last resort, he attempts suicide by drowning himself in a bathtub. He is the fifth to be rescued after Ho-seok.

- Kim Tae-hyung

Named after and based from BTS' V, Kim Tae-hyung is one of Seok-jin's best friends, the second youngest among the seven young men. Since childhood, he and his older sister were subject to physical abuse by their father, who is a drunkard. During their father's tantrums, his older sister would tell him to hide while she takes all the beating. Due to his family problems, he ends up becoming a delinquent and would often be in police custody. He is particularly close to Nam-joon whose container home is his usual hideout from the police. He is destined to become a murderer upon killing his father by stabbing him with a broken liquor bottle. He is the last to be attempted to be rescued from this ill fate, at the cost of Seok-jin's life. It is also hinted in some episodes of the series that he actually possesses precognitive powers, seeing his friends' ill fates through his dreams.

=== Supporting ===
- The snobbish customer (Eps. 1, 3)

A haughty customer that Nam-joon meets at the petrol station on the night of April 11. He treats Nam-joon disrespectfully, provoking him into fighting back, leading to Nam-joon's imprisonment.

- A voice (Eps. 1–2, 13, 15)

an unknown supernatural entity who offers Seok-jin his imprisonment in the time loop as a way for him to save his six friends from their miseries. It manifests itself through a small creature and through supernatural visions only Seok-jin can see.

- The narcoleptic child (Ep. 8)

One of the patients in the ward where Ji-min and Ho-seok are also confined.

- Ji-min's mother (Ep. 12)

She forces Ji-min to be confined in the hospital indefinitely after she and her husband became exasperated by Ji-min's seizures.

- Tae-hyung's older sister (Eps. 14–15)

To protect Tae-hyung during their father's tantrums, she would tell him to hide so that she would take all the beating.

- Tae-hyung's father (Eps. 14–15)

an alcoholic man who subjects his son and daughter to extreme physical abuse. He is destined to be killed by his retaliating son Tae-hyung.

== Release and response ==
The prologue and the first two episodes of Save Me were uploaded on January 17, 2019, in both the Naver (Korean) and Line (English) webtoon portals and was subsequently updated with a new episode every Thursday. Official versions of the webtoon are available in Korean, English, Japanese, both Simplified and Traditional Chinese, Indonesian, and Thai. On February 1, 2019, WEBTOON also opened Save Me to fan translations through a post on its official Twitter account. The series officially concluded on April 11 with the uploading of its last two episodes.

On March 15, 2019, Save Me was featured in an exhibition by Naver's Line Friends Store in Times Square, New York City. The exhibition showcased exclusive figurines of the seven central characters of the webtoon, although the figurines are not for sale. Line Friends Store also opened another Save Me exhibition in their Harajuku, Tokyo, branch on March 22, 2019; both exhibitions ended on April 18, 2019.

On March 28–30, 2019, BTS members Jin, Jungkook, and J-Hope were featured reading and commenting on Save Me through short video clips uploaded by WEBTOON in their Twitter and YouTube accounts. The said artists are the real-life bases for the Save Me characters Seok-jin, Jung-kook, and Ho-seok, respectively.

Save Me, including other related works under the BTS Universe, has been the subject of much debate and theorizing among BTS fans. Hours after its initial release, it gained mostly positive response from readers and BTS fans. It quickly earned 20,000 followers with the release of its first two episodes. Save Me garnered a 9.9 rating on WEBTOON, and at its closing, the webtoon reached 50 million accumulated views.
