= Tongyang Group =

South Korean enterprise

Korean name
- Hangul: 동양그룹
- Hanja: 東洋그룹
- RR: Dongyang geurup
- MR: Tongyang kŭrup

The Tongyang Group, also spelled Tong Yang Group, is a South Korean conglomerate founded in 1957 by Lee Yang-gu, a confectionery businessman who had decided to expand into the cement industry. Over the following decades it expanded to include holdings as diverse as financial services companies and a basketball team. As of September 2013, it was the country's 38th-largest conglomerate, but that month it defaulted on its debt due to cash flow issues, and looked to sell off key subsidiaries to raise funds. In January 2014, group chairman Hyun Jae-hyun and three other senior executives were arrested on charges including fraud and malpractice in issuance and sales of financial products.

== History ==
The Tongyang Group was founded in 1957 as a cement manufacturer by Lee Yang-gu. Lee had previously used the Tongyang name in his Tongyang Confectionery Manufacturing Company, which he started after coming from his native South Hamgyong Province (in what is today North Korea) to Seoul in 1947. His commercial success led to his being dubbed the "Sugar King", and he used his own capital to take over a cement factory in Samcheok, Gangwon Province; its owners at the time were eager to sell due to frequent labour disputes and the poor state of the physical plant. That factory had started operations in 1942 under the ownership of Onoda Cement (now Taiheiyo Cement) during Japanese colonial rule over Korea. Lee searched out former Onoda engineers in order to rehire them, in particular Oh Pyong-ho, "supposedly the only competent cement engineer in post-colonial South Korea"; Oh accepted the job offer. Lee then began repairs to the facilities with the aid of engineers from Germany's Polysius Company, resolved the labour disputes, and revamped the recruiting programmes; he hired heavily from the local Samcheok High School, and many of his new hires' fathers had worked for Onoda in the past.

The South Korean cement industry experienced a boom in the mid-1970s. Hyun Jae-hyun, the husband of Lee Yang-gu's eldest daughter Lee Hae-kyung, abandoned his previous career as a prosecutor to join Tongyang Cement in 1977, and oversaw the Tongyang Group's expansion from cement into a wide variety of other fields, particularly in financial services in the 1980s. He was promoted to group chairman in 1989. By 2009, financial services subsidiaries such as Tongyang Life Insurance and Tongyang Securities contributed more than seven-tenths of the Tongyang Group's sales.

Like many South Korean companies with construction interests, Tongyang Group companies were often highly leveraged; Tongyang Inc., for instance, had a debt-to-equity ratio of 12-to-1 in June 2013. The group faced a cash shortage in September 2013, leading to doubts about its ability to repay debts maturing at the end of the month; NICE Investors Service estimated that it needed to raise ₩800 billion to survive. It was reported that the group would issue securities backed by the assets of key subsidiaries, and then liquidate them. On 30 September 2013, Tongyang Group failed to pay back more than ₩100 billion in debt, and officially filed for court receivership for three of its subsidiaries: Tongyang Corp., Tongyang International, and Tongyang Leisure. The list of subsidiaries in receivership soon expanded to five with the addition of Tongyang Networks and Tongyang Cement.

== Subsidiaries in 2014 ==
In 2013, according to its organisational chart, the Tongyang Group had 17 South Korean subsidiaries in the field of manufacturing, seven in the field of financial services, and six offering other services. Group members also have foreign subsidiaries or representative offices in various Asian countries including Cambodia, China, Japan, Indonesia, Vietnam, and in countries of the Americas including Argentina, Colombia, and the United States. Tongyang Cement, Tongyang Power, and Tongyang Securities were called the "key subsidiaries" of the Tongyang Group. Since then, Tongyang Power and Tongyang Securities were sold to outside acquirers. Some of the remaining major subsidiaries are described below.

=== Tongyang Inc. ===
Tongyang Inc. (KRX: 001520), known as Tong Yang Major (동양메이저) until June 2011, is described as the de facto holding company of the Tongyang Group.

=== Tongyang Cement & Energy ===
Tongyang Cement & Energy (동양시멘트; KRX: 038500) went into court receivership on 1 October 2013, and the Korea Exchange suspended trading of its shares. In September 2015, Sampyo Group and a Korea Development Bank private equity fund acquired a 55% stake in the company for ₩794 billion, and renamed it Sampyo Cement in April 2017.

=== Tongyang Networks ===
Tongyang Networks (동양네트웍스; KRX: 030790) went into court receivership on 1 October 2013. Observers were surprised, as Tongyang Networks was considered one of the group's best-run companies and a "cash cow". Its June 2013 audit report stated that it had cashable assets of ₩57.8 billion. It had a half-year operating loss of ₩2.9 billion, but had nearly its doubled sales revenue from ₩159.9 billion in 2011 to ₩319.2 billion in 2012.

=== Hanil Synthetic Fiber ===
Hanil Synthetic Fiber (한일합섬), a textiles company, was founded in 1964, but went into court receivership after the 1997 Asian financial crisis. Tong Yang Major acquired Hanil Synthetic Fiber in 2007. The acquisition resulted in an investigation to determine whether the ₩374.5 billion acquisition had violated laws against leveraged buyouts. Tong Yang Major had created a special purpose vehicle which issued debt to finance the acquisition of Hanil, and then used Hanil's cash reserves to repay much of the debt. However, the trial court disagreed with prosecutors that this was a breach of fiduciary duty by Tong Yang Major directors or that this had resulted in economic harm to Hanil. Both an appellate court and the Supreme Court of South Korea upheld the trial court's ruling.

Hanil was merged into Tong Yang Major in May 2008, which resulted in a violation of South Korea's cross-investment rules on affiliates within the same business group: Tong Yang Magic held a 1.05% stake in Hanil, and failed to divest its holdings within a six-month grace period after a November 2009 warning, due to which Tong Yang Magic was fined ₩173 million by the Fair Trade Commission in March 2010.

== Subsidiaries sold in 2013 and 2014 ==
=== Tongyang Power ===
Tongyang Power (동양파워) is an electricity generation company. In September 2013, it was owned 55.02% by Tongyang Cement, 19.99% by Tongyang Corp., and 24.99% by Tongyang Leisure. In January 2013, Tongyang Power made what would ultimately be a successful bid to build and operate a two million kilowatt, ₩10 trillion powerplant in Samcheok, Gangwon Province, proposing to use an abandoned mine owned by Tongyang Cement. Even before the bid was officially accepted, on news that Tongyang Power was likely to win, shares in Tongyang Inc. rose to the upper trading halt limit of 15%. During Tongyang Group's late 2013 crisis, the group had initially planned to sell only a minority stake in Tongyang Power, with the aim of raising funds so they could carry through with the construction of the Samcheok plant. However, by late September 2013, group officials expressed their willingness to sell the entire company; one stated, "Survival of the group comes first over everything else. We will give up anything to save the group."

In June 2014, POSCO Energy's board of directors voted to acquire all outstanding shares of Tongyang Power in a ₩431.1 billion deal.

=== Tongyang Securities ===
Tongyang Securities (동양증권; KRX: 003470) is a brokerage and financial services company. It was known as Ilguk Securities until 1984, when the Tongyang Group purchased it and renamed it to its present name. Within five years it had become one of the top ten securities companies in the country. Among its subsidiaries is Tong Yang Bank (formerly Orion Bank), a Bangko Sentral ng Pilipinas-licensed retail bank founded in 1997, whose primary market is South Korean expatriates in the Philippines. Tongyang Securities has overseas representative offices in Beijing, Ho Chi Minh City, Hong Kong, New York City, Phnom Penh, and Tokyo.

In the aftermath of Tongyang Group's default in September 2013, Tongyang Securities faced massive fund withdrawals, causing its deposits to decline by 40% over a period of about two months to ₩2.3 trillion. By the end of that period, the pace of withdrawals had slown. By January 2014, roughly 600 employees had chosen to leave the company. The Tongyang Group made efforts to sell Tongyang Securities in order to raise funds and pay back debts, but Tongyang Securities' prospects for a sale were said to be far poorer than sister company Tongyang Power, both due to decreased profitability and because Woori Investment & Securities was also being sold and so competed with it for potential acquirers. Deloitte Anjin supervised Tongyang Securities' sales efforts, but in early January 2014, KB Financial Group withdrew from bidding.

Tongyang Securities also faced accusations of misconduct in selling Tongyang Group company bonds to individual investors, an issue which was drawn to widespread public attention when a female employee committed suicide on 2 October 2013 and left behind a suicide note describing her guilt and regret for her sales recommendations to her customers. An investigation by the Financial Supervisory Service found evidence of fraud by Tongyang Securities, amidst accusations by individual investors that Tongyang Securities had sold them bonds of Tongyang Group companies without properly informing them of the risks. The FSS report found that Hyun had "compelled" Tongyang Securities to sell those bonds, while Tongyang Securities CEO Jung Jin-seok had lied to employees about Tongyang's financial condition in an effort to encourage them to sell more Tongyang bonds. More than 800 affected customers filed a class-action lawsuit against the Tongyang Group and South Korean regulators in January 2014, seeking restitution of their losses.

In July 2014, Yuanta Securities of Taiwan bought out 53.61% of Tongyang Securities from Tongyang International and Leisure. Yuanta appointed Hwang Wei-cherng as a new co-CEO alongside then-current CEO Suh Myung-suk, and indicated that Tongyang Securities would rename itself and begin using the Yuanta brand name.

== Subsidiaries sold before 2013 ==
=== Orion Group ===
The Orion Group, formerly a subsidiary, was spun off in 2001; its chairman Tam Chul-kon is Tongyang Group chairman Hyun Jae-hyun's brother-in-law. Among Orion's major subsidiaries is Orion (formerly Tongyang Confectionery), a major snacks manufacturer whose products include Choco Pies. The Tongyang Orions, the Tongyang Group's Korean Basketball League team based in Daegu at the time, also came under Orion Group ownership, and officially dropped the "Tongyang" from their name starting from the 2003–04 season.

=== Tongyang Life Insurance ===
Tongyang Life Insurance (동양생명보험; KRX: 082640) is a life insurance company with the Tongyang brand name. The Vogo Fund, a private equity fund, reached a deal to increase its stake in Tongyang Life Insurance from 13.5% to 60% in November 2010 for ₩900 billion. In March 2011, when the purchase actually went through, Vogo acquired only an additional 44.05% of the company, with Atinum Partners CEO Lee Min-joo purchasing the remainder of the amount that Vogo had originally agreed to purchase. Afterwards, it was less closely connected to the Tongyang Group than other group members, though it continued to use the Tongyang name, and also held 4.25 million shares in Tongyang Inc. However, in the aftermath of the Tongyang Group's late 2013 crisis, Tongyang Life still saw an outflow of customers, and moved to decrease its remaining ties to the rest of the group. By late October 2013, Tongyang Life stated that it had sold all of its shares in Tongyang Inc.; by that point Tongyang Life had almost no shareholding ties to the rest of the group, with Tongyang Securities owning only a 3% stake in Tongyang Life and group chairman Hyun Jae-hyun owning another 1,283 shares. Tongyang Life was also reportedly seeking to change its name.
