= Samcheok =

City in Gangwon, South Korea

- Municipal city
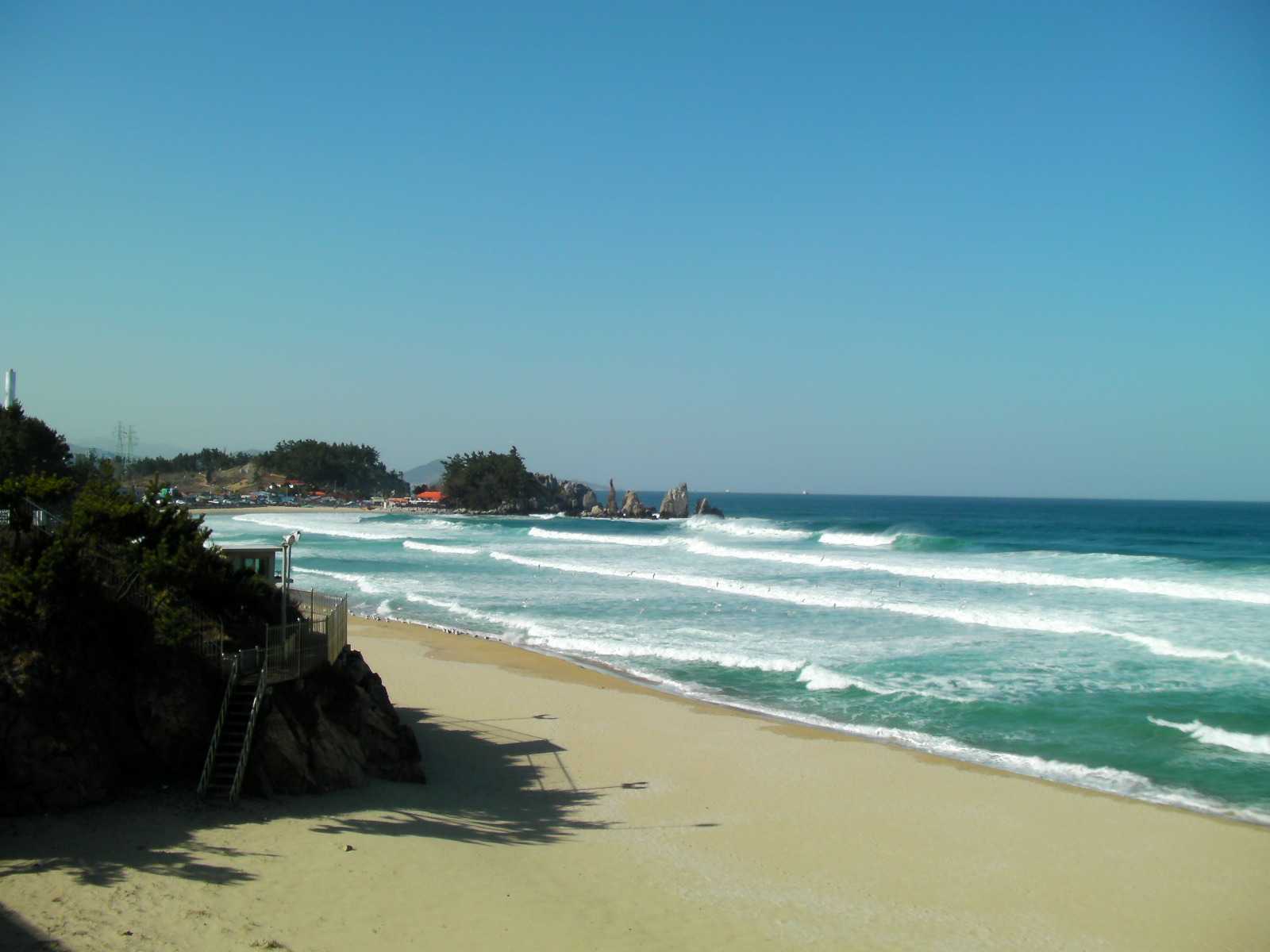
- Naritgol Village in Samcheok Samcheok Beach

- Flag Logo

- Location in South Korea
- Coordinates: 37.450°N 129.165°E
- Country: South Korea
- State: Gangwon
- Administrative divisions: 2 eup, 6 myeon, 4 dong

Government
  - mayor: Park Sang-su (박상수)

Area
  - Total: 1,185.78 km^{2} (457.83 sq mi)

Population (September 2024)
  - Total: 62,111
  - Density: 52.380/km^{2} (135.66/sq mi)
- Area code: +82-33
- Climate: Cfa

Korean name
- Hangul: 삼척시
- Hanja: 三陟市
- RR: Samcheok-si
- MR: Samch'ŏk-si

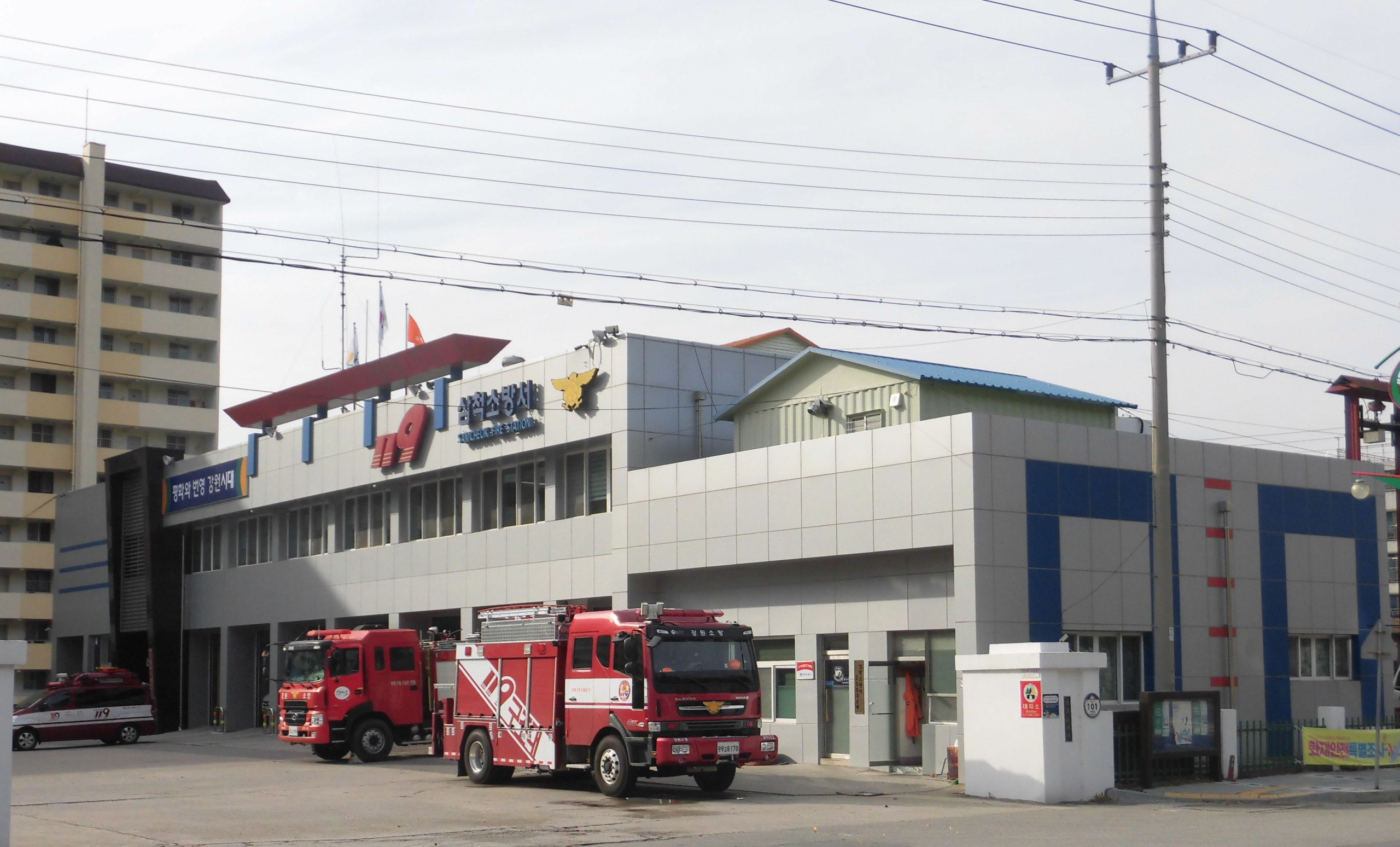
Samcheok Fire Station

Samcheok (Korean: 삼척; Korean pronunciation: [sa̠m.tɕʰʌ̹k̚]) is a city in the state of Gangwon, South Korea. To the west are the Taebaek Mountains, which form a high flat plain of more than 1,000 meters, and to the east the coastal plain slopes sharply. Samcheok borders Donghae in the north, Uljin County in North Gyeongsang Province to the south, and Taebaek in the west. It covers an area of 1,185.86 square kilometers and has a coastline of 58.4 kilometers. Samcheok's city hall is located in Gyo-dong. Samcheok includes 2 districts, 6 villages, and 4 neighborhoods or dongs. The city's official tree is the zelkova while the official bird is the seagull and the official flower is the azalea. Samcheok has the lowest population density of any autonomous city in South Korea.

== History ==
Samcheok was initially named Siljikguk or Siljikgokguk. During the sixth year of King Jijeung's reign in 505 CE, its name changed to Sil-jick joo. In the fifth year of King Muyeol's reign in 658, its name changed to Book-jin. Its name changed to Samcheok-gun in the sixteenth year of King Gyeongdeok's reign in 757. During the fourteenth year of King Seongjong's reign in 995, its name changed to Cheokjoo. During the ninth year of King Hyeonjong's reign in 1018, its name changed to Samcheok-hyun.

Samcheok-hyun was promoted to Samcheok-bu in 1393 during the second year of King Taejo's reign. During the thirteenth year of King Taejong's reign in 1413, it became the Samcheok protectorate before being changed to Samcheok-gun during the thirty-second year of King Gojong's reign in 1895. During Japan's occupation of Korea, it was changed to Samcheok-myeon in 1917 and promoted to Samcheok-eup in 1938.

In 1973, the Hwangji branch office of Jangsung-eup, the most populous in the county, was promoted to Hwangji-eup. In 1980, Bukpyeong-eup was incorporated into Donghae-si and Wondeock-myeon was elevated to Wondeock-eup. In 1981, Jangseong-eup and Hwangji-eup were joined into Taebaek-si. In 1986, Samcheok-eup was elevated to Samcheok-si and Wondeok-eup Ojeo branch office was promoted to Kagok-myeon. In 1989, Yonghwa-ri and Jangho-ri were incorporated into Gundeok-myeon. In 1994, Hajang-myeon's five districts were incorporated into Taebaek-si. In 1995, Samcheok-si and Samcheok-gun were combined and incorporated into Samcheok-si.

== Education ==
Samcheok has one university, KNU Samcheok Campus, formerly known as Samcheok National University until 2006.

== Climate ==
Located along the Taebaek Mountains and eastern coast, Samcheok has a mild and humid climate classified as oceanic. Due to the differences in elevation, the temperature difference between the eastern and inland regions is about 30 degrees. The maritime climate is mild with seasonal cold, turbulent currents, and abundant fish resources.

The average temperature over the past 12 years is 12.5 °C, somewhat higher than other provinces in the Yeongseo region. The highest temperature was 37.5 °C on July 29, 1992, and the lowest temperature was -13.5 °C on January 26, 1990.

The temperature distribution shows an average of 24.1 °C in August and an average of 0.5 °C in January, indicating cooler summers and milder winters. Precipitation averages 1,284.5 mm per year with more than 50% of the precipitation falling from July to August. The highest daily precipitation measured was 819 mm in Nogok during Typhoon Rusa from August 31, 2002, to September 1, 2002. Due to the influence of the northeasterly winds, it snows heavily in the winter and sometimes even into the spring months of March and April.

== Sister cities ==
=== Domestic ===
- Seongbuk District, Seoul (October 14, 1999)
- Yeonsu District, Incheon (October 13, 2000)
- Guri, Gyeonggi Province (March 20, 2001)
- Icheon, Gyeonggi Province (August 17, 2004)
- Seongnam, Gyeonggi Province (June 22, 2007)
- Ulleung County, North Gyeongsang Province (June 25, 2009)

=== International ===
- Akabira, Japan (July 18, 1997)
- Kanda, Japan (July 1997)
- Wangqing County, China (September 4, 1997)
- Kurobe, Japan (November 5, 1998)
- Dongying, China (March 24, 1999)
- Kungur, Russia (May 30, 2003)
- Mareeba Shire, Australia (November 9, 2004)
- Jixi, China (May 21, 2008)
- Korsakov, Russia (August 30, 2010)

== Notable people ==
- Hwang Young-cho - marathon runner (winner of the marathon race at the 1992 Summer Olympics and 1994 Asian Games)
- Lee Jaehyeong - member of K-pop band The Rose

== Transportation ==
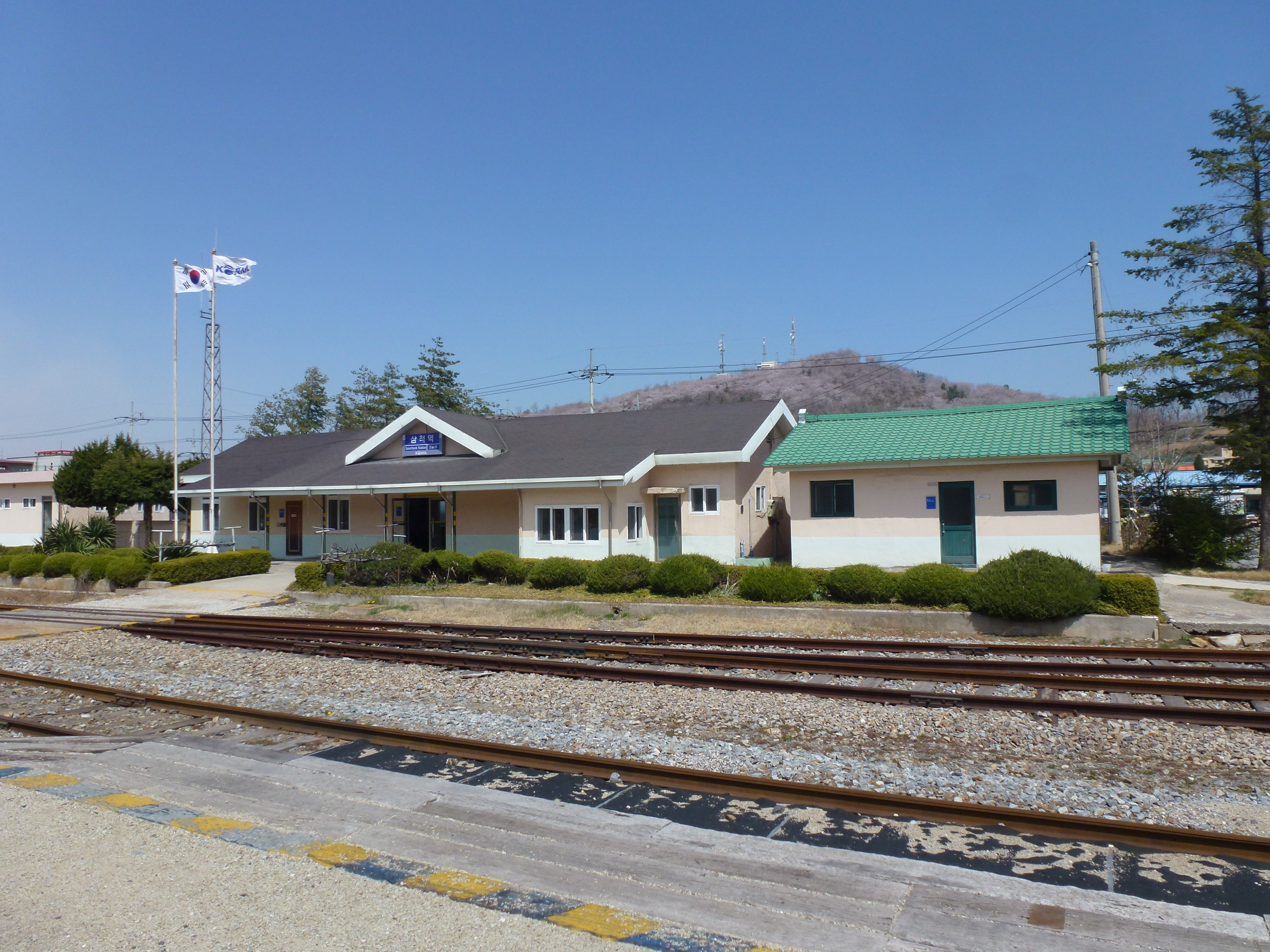
Samcheok Station

- Samcheok Station

== Tourist Attractions ==
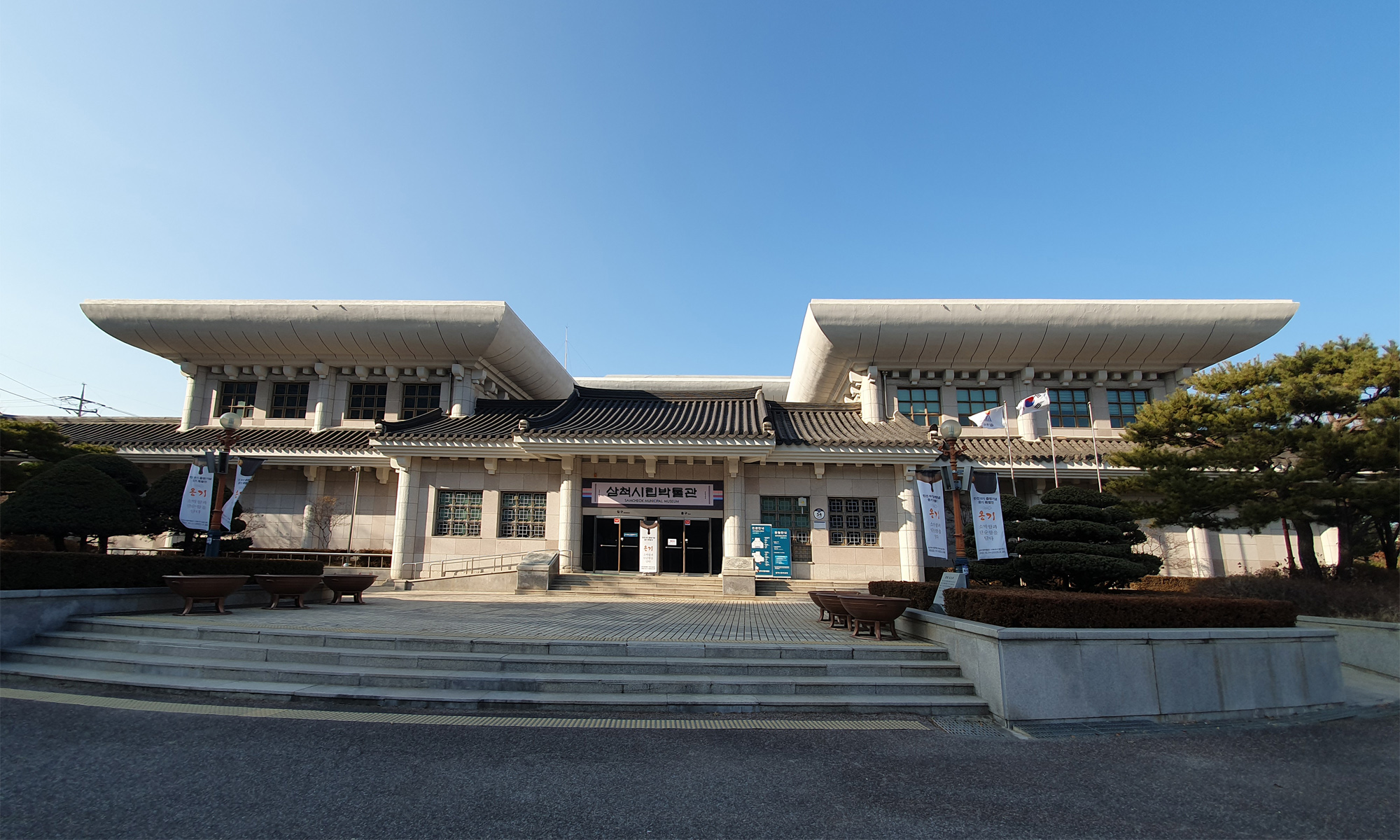
Samcheok Municipal Museum

- Samcheok Railbike
- Hwanseong and Daegeum Caves
- Haesindang Park - Also known as the Penis Park.
- Samcheok Rose Park
- Samcheok, Jeungsan, Yonghwa, Maengbang and Jangho Beaches.
- Samcheok Maengbang Canola Flower Festival

== See also ==
- List of cities in South Korea
