= Deokgasan =

Deokgasan may refer to:

- Deokgasan (Gangwon) in the city of Wonju, Gangwon-do in South Korea. 832 metres.
- Deokgasan (Goesan) in the county of Goesan, Chungcheongbuk-do. 858 metres.
- Deokgasan (North Chungcheong/North Gyeongsang) in the county of Goesan, Chungcheongbuk-do and the city of Sanju, Gyeongsanbuk-do. 707 metres.
