= Howard Rubenstein =

Howard Rubenstein may refer to:

- Howard J. Rubenstein (1932–2020), American lawyer and public relations expert
- Howard Rubenstein (physician) (born 1931), American physician, playwright and translator
