= Young-min Kim =

South Korean scholar of Korean literature

- Born: April 26, 1955 (age 71); Seoul, South Korea
- Occupations: scholar, critic, writer

Academic background
- Education: Yonsei University

Academic work
- Main interests: Modern Korean literature

Korean name
- Hangul: 김영민
- Hanja: 金榮敏
- RR: Gim Yeongmin
- MR: Kim Yŏngmin
- IPA: [kim.jʌŋ.min]

Young-min Kim (Korean: 김영민; born 1955) is a South Korean literary scholar and critic. Kim's research interests have included the history of modern and contemporary Korean literature, with a focus on literary works produced during the late nineteenth and early twentieth centuries. He conducted research concerning the Korean Enlightenment period in the late nineteenth century.

Kim was recognized as a distinguished scholar by the National Research Foundation of Korea for his study of Korean literature in 2007. He has also received the title of Distinguished Underwood Professor by Yonsei University, and he was awarded the Nanjeong Academic Prize in 2019.

== Life and career ==
Young-min Kim was born in Seoul, South Korea, on April 26, 1955. Kim attended Daegwang Middle School and Daegwang High School, later studying at Yonsei University where he earned his master's and doctoral degrees in Korean Literature. He wrote his doctoral thesis on 1920s Korean literary criticism.

From 1984 to 1987, Kim served as an assistant professor at Jeonbuk National University and later as a professor of Korean literature at Yonsei University Mirae Campus. He was a visiting scholar at Harvard-Yenching Institute in 1994 and 2003, and a visiting scholar at Rikkyo University from 1997 to 1998.

In 2007, Kim was selected as a national scholar for his achievements in the study of the history of modern Korean novels.

From 2008 to 2010, Young-min Kim was the president of the Society of Korean Literary Studies (한국문학연구학회) and the director of the Institute for the Study of Korean Modernity (근대한국학연구소). He is currently a professor emeritus of Korean literature at Yonsei University.

== New Methodology for Modern Korean Literature ==
Kim introduces a paradigm that works as the foundation for the history of modern Korean novels. He applied his methodology emphasizing media and language to describe the formation of modern Korean literature.

His book, A Study on the Literary System and Formation of the National Language for Modern Korean Literature (문학제도 및 민족어의 형성과 한국 근대문학(1890-1945), 2012), the English translated version of which is The History of Modern Korean Fiction (1890-1945): The Topography of Literary Systems and Form, is the first South Korean book to be selected for Choice Reviews' annual list of Outstanding Academic Titles. Choice Reviews praised Kim's detailed and extensive notes on the development of modern fiction and the translation of Rachel Min Park.

His book explores Korean texts in the Korean Enlightenment period, illustrating his comprehensive and contextualizing perspective. His analysis provides new insights into cultural developments, such as the emergence of new literary styles and genres.

He analyzes a wide array of genres and styles of texts, bridging the gap left by literary scholars who disregarded the importance of socio-historical context.

== Awards and achievements ==
Kim received many awards, including:

- Yonsei University Academic Award (Humanities and Social Sciences) (연세대학교 학술상 (인문과학부문), 1997)
- Distinguished Underwood Professor (언더우드 특훈교수 선정, 1998)
- 38th Korea Baeksang Publishing Culture Award - Writers' Award (제 38회 한국백상출판문화상 - 저술상, 1998)
- Distinguished Scholar (National Scholar) by National Research Foundation of Korea (한국연구재단 우수학자 (국가석학) 선정, 2007)
- Yonsei University Outstanding Researcher Award (연세대학교 연구우수교수, 2007)
- Recognition of Outstanding Research Capabilities (우수연구실적표창, 2008)
- Yonsei University Outstanding Researcher Award (연세대학교 연구우수교수, 2013)
- Outstanding Achievement Award (Research Section) (우수업적교수상, 2018)
- 4th Nanjeong Academic Award (제 4회 난정학술상, 2019)

== Criticism ==
Kim had changed the trend of modern Korean literary criticism, mainly focusing on the criticism of proletarian literature during the 1920s-30s. Kim's approach emphasized the significance of continuity in Korean literary criticism. According to the "continuity theory" he advocates, the interconnections between literary theory and the historical context of Korea form the development of modern Korean literary criticism. Kim contributed to bridging the gap between literary criticism and historical context by stressing continuity.

Examples he provides for his continuity theory include his assessment of the history of criticism in the 1930s. He views the history of criticism in the 1930s as "the united front of literature", advocating Ham-gwang An's perspective that perceives humanism as an anti-fascist struggle for class solidarity. Concerning Kim's opinion, Sung-su Kim, a lecturer at Sungkyunkwan University, argues that the assumption of cooperation and solidarity seems questionable since hegemony and collision occur between bourgeois literature and proletarian literature. Kim highlighted the close connection between the history of criticism and the evolution of national literature theory, encompassing the period from pre-independence to the early 1990s. Additionally, he expanded the boundaries of national literature theory by underlining the continuity of criticism that persisted from the post-independence era to the critique of modern Korean fiction during the colonial period. In 1999, he addressed the history of KAPF (Korean Artist Proletarian Federation)'s literary criticism and the main arguments in the history of modern Korean literary criticism.

== Works ==
=== Remapping and Positivism of Literary History ===
Kim restructures literary history through two notions, i.e., "remapping" and "positivism". He introduced these notions in his book, A Study on the Literary System and Formation of the National Language for Modern Korean Literature (1890-1945). He remaps authors and literary works by time and place. He analyzes many sources, such as newspapers and magazines, to prove that positivism is crucial. He argues that interpretations based on Western ideological criteria distorted Korean literary history by overlooking external sources which formed modern Korean fiction. Kim uses various external sources, such as literary systems, media, and language, beyond the boundaries of literature to restructure the history of Korean literature.

=== The Formation of Modern Fiction through Editorials and Narratives ===
Yu-Chan Choi, a professor of Korean language and literature at Yonsei University, credits Kim for discovering the importance of editorials and narratives in the development of modern fiction. In his book, History of Modern Korean Fiction (한국 근대 소설사, 1997), Kim defines the critical traits of modern fiction as editorials, narratives, and enlightenment. He connects the three categories, focusing on the contributions of editorials and narratives to the Korean Enlightenment in developing the history of fiction. He uses Yi Gwangsu's works as an example of modern fiction. He redefines Yi Gwangsu's Mujeong as modern fiction by comparing the similarities and connections between Yi Gwangsu's editorial, Rural Community Development, and his fiction, Mujeong. By verifying the relationship between Yi's editorial and fiction, he argues that the influence of editorial and narrative forms modern fiction.

== Published works ==
=== Authored books ===
- Suju Byeon Young Lo Critical Biography (수주 변영로 평전, 1985)
- A Study on Modern Korean Authors (한국근대작가 연구, 1985)
- A Study on Literary Theory (문학이론연구, 1989)
- A Study on the History of Korean Literary Argument Criticism (한국문학 비평논쟁사, 1992)
- National Literature and Modernity (민족문학과 근대성, 1995)
- History of Modern Korean Fiction (한국근대소설사, 1997)
- A New Understanding of Yeom Sang-seop's Literature (염상섭 문학의 재인식, 1998)
- A Study on the History of Modern Korean Literary Criticism (한국근대문학비평사, 1999)
- The Reflection and Prospect on Korean Literature in 20th Century(20세기 한국문학의 반성과 쟁점, 1999)
- A Study on the History of Modern Korean Literary Criticism 2(한국현대문학비평사, 2000)
- Korean Literature in the World (세계 속의 한국문학, 2002)
- Korean Literature in a Multimedia Era (다매체 시대의 한국문학, 2002)
- A New Understanding of Lim Hwa's Literature (임화 문학의 재인식, 2004)
- Accommodation of Western Culture and Modern Reformation (서구문화의 수용과 근대개혁, 2004)
- A New Understanding of Lee Tae Jun's Literature (이태준 문학의 재인식, 2004)
- A Study on the Relationship between Modern Korean Narratives and Media (한국 근대 서사양식의 발생 및 전개와 매체의 역할, 2005)
- Korean Language and Literature Asking the Future Path (국어국문학, 미래의 길을 묻다, 2005)
- A Study on the Process of Development of Modern Korean Narratives (한국 근대소설의 형성과정, 2005)
- Tradition and Modernity of East Asian Narratology (동아시아 서사학의 전통과 근대, 2005)
- A Study on the Modern Korean Narratives and Newspapers: Korea Daily News (한국의 근대신문과 근대소설1: 대한매일신보, 2006)
- Reading Korean Classics (한국의 고전을 읽는다, 2006)
- A New Understanding of Korean Literature in the Modern Enlightenment Era (근대계몽기 문학의 재인식, 2007)
- A Study on the Modern Korean Newspapers and Modern Novels 2: Hanseong Shinbo (한국의 근대신문과 근대소설2: 한성신보, 2008)
- Reading the History of Literature through Papers 1 (논문으로 읽는 문학사 1, 2008)
- Modernity and Postmodernity of Korean Literature (한국문학의 근대와 근대극복, 2010)
- The History of Modern Korean Fiction: The Topography of Literary Systems and Form (1890-1945) (문학제도 및 민족어의 형성과 한국 근대문학 (1890-1945), 2012)
- Controversial Issue of Study on Modern Korean and Japanese Language and Literature (한일근대 어문학 연구의 쟁점, 2013)
- A Study on the Modern Korean Newspapers and Modern Novels 3: Manse Sinbo (한국의 근대신문과 근대소설3: 만세보, 2014)
- Time under the Heaven Tree: Reading Yeom Sang-Seop (저수하의 시간, 염상섭을 읽다, 2014)
- A New Understanding of Yeom Sang-Seop (염상섭 문학의 재인식, 2016)
- A New Understanding of Yi Sang's Literature (이상문학의 재인식, 2017)
- A Study on the Modern Korean Literature and Magazine Issued by Korean Students in Japan in the 1910s (1910년대 일본 유학생 잡지 연구, 2019) )

=== Edited books ===
- A Complete Collection of the Short Narratives in the Modern Enlightenment Period (근대계몽기 단형 서사문학 자료전집 (상,하) 2003)
- Animal's Congress (금수회의록, 2004)
- A Study on the Short Narratives in the Modern Enlightenment Period (근대계몽기 단형 서사문학 연구, 2005)

=== Translations ===
- The Anatomy of the Novel (소설의 분석, 1984)
- Realism and Literature (리얼리즘과 문학, 1985)
- Modern Knowledge and 'Choseon-World' Transition of Perception (근대지식과 '조선-세계' 인식의 전환, 2019)
- A Study on the Process of Development of Modern Korean Narratives (한국 근대소설의 형성과정, 2019)
- A Literary Understanding of the 3.1 Movement (3.1운동의 문학적 재인식, 2020)
- Media Text Language and Cultural Changes in Early Modern Korea (한국 근대 초기의 미디어, 텍스트, 언어와 문화변동, 2022)
