= Florence Murray =

Florence Murray may refer to:

- Florence K. Murray (1916–2004), Rhode Island politician and judge
- Florence J. Murray, Canadian medical doctor, missionary, and professor
