= Albin Garfield Anderson =

American medical missionary

Albin Garfield Anderson (April 13, 1882 – March 4, 1971) was an American medical missionary who served as a physician in Korea for 30 years and in Southern Rhodesia for 5 years. He founded the Swedish Methodist Hospital in 1913 in Wonju, Korea which is now the emergency room of Wonju Severance Christian Hospital. Anderson began his missionary work in 1911 serving with the United Methodist Church. During his time in Korea he served as physician, professor, and interim pastor to the people of Wonju and Pyongyang. After Korea was facing pressure from the Japanese empire, Anderson moved his services to Southern Rhodesia where he served as a physician at a community healthcare center and leprosy hospital.

== Early life and education ==
Anderson was born in Andover, Illinois to Alfred Anderson, a Swedish Methodist Pastor, and Augusta Johnesdotter Anderson. Anderson was heavily influenced by his father and was involved in ministry and voluntary work early on in his life. On November 16, 1910, he married Harriet Florence Peterson right before his missionary trip to Korea.

Anderson attended Lake View High School in Chicago and graduated from Northwestern University with a Bachelor's in Liberal Arts degree in 1904. During his undergraduate studies he was involved in religious activities including being a Sunday School teacher, Vice President of the Junior Epworth League in Chicago, and a deacon at his local church. It was during this time that Anderson developed a calling for missionary work abroad. He continued towards his path of becoming a medical missionary by graduating from the School of Medicine at Northwestern University in 1908. Anderson was an active member of the YMCA of the Northwestern medical school.

== Career/Missionary Work ==
After graduating from the School of Medicine at Northwestern University, Anderson interned at a hospital in Milwaukee, Wisconsin and was later trained at Saint Francis Hospital in Wichita, Kansas. In 1909 he submitted a missionary application to the International Missions Department of the United Methodist Church. Anderson was granted his wish, He and his wife left for Korea on December 5, 1910, and arrived on January 4, 1911, tasked to establish a missions department in Wonju and build a hospital.

=== Missionary work in Korea ===
Anderson was appointed a medical missionary at the 5th Association of the Methodist Conference in Sangdong Church, Seoul for the Wonju area. During this time he studied Korean and was a faculty member at the Severance Union Medical College. Anderson was appointed the director of the institution from 1931 to 1937.

Anderson led and organized the construction of the Swedish Methodist Hospital which started in spring 1913 and was completed by November. Most funds for construction were from the American Northern Methodist Church Members of Swedish Origin and was named "Swedish Methodist Hospital" to honor immigrant Swedish Methodist practicers in the US. The hospital was initially run by small monetary donations and material support from its donors, and aid from the missionary group but eventually regular donations came in allowing the expansion of free medical services and financial independence. The medical staff consisted of 5 westerners and 5 doctors who graduated from Severance Union Medical College. Anderson continued to treat patients until 1920, when he moved to Pyongyang to work at the Hall Memorial Union Hospital. The hospital closed shortly in 1922 after Anderson's leave but was continued by other's work including Samuel Easton Mcmanis and eventually was rebuilt and merged to create a larger medical facility by Florence J. Murray.

The Pyongyang Union Christian Hospital was created from the merger of Women's Dispensary of Extended Grace and Hall Memorial Union Hospital (where Anderson was working at) in 1923. Anderson continued to see patients and specialized in radiology. He served as the director of the hospital from 1933 to 1939.

=== Missionary work in Southern Rhodesia ===
Anderson was brought home from the Methodist Church because of the pressures surrounding Korea from WWII. He was sent to serve as the head of a new mission and clinical services in Nayadiri, Southern Rhodesia, Africa for five years. As a result of the local climate and local civil war conditions in Southern Rhodesia, Anderson's health conditions greatly declined and he returned to Chicago. Anderson returned to the US on March 3, 1946, and worked at the Bethany Methodist Hospital until his retirement in 1960.

== Legacy ==
Anderson's construction of the Swedish Methodist Hospital paved the way for future physicians including Sa Young Ahn and Samuel Easton Mcmanis who continued to work at the hospital after Anderson was relocated to Pyongyang.

The Swedish Methodist Hospital was later reconstructed by Florence J Murray into a larger facility known as the Wonju Christian Hospital which opened in November 1959. The Wonju Christian Hospital merged with Yonsei University and today is now known as Yonsei University Wonju Campus.

Anderson died on March 4, 1971, and several of his medical reports are recorded.
