= Florence J. Murray =

Canadian medical doctor and missionary (1894–1975)

- Born: February 16, 1894; Pictou Landing, Nova Scotia, Canada
- Died: April 14, 1975 (aged 81); Pictou Landing, Nova Scotia, Canada
- Other name: Mu lili (Hanja: 慕禮理)
- Education: Prince of Wales College; Dalhousie University School of Medicine
- Occupation: Medical missionary

Florence Jessie Murray (February 16, 1894 – April 14, 1975) was a Canadian medical doctor, missionary, and professor who worked in Korea for over forty years, notable for her pioneering contributions as a woman in the male-dominated field of medicine, dedication to service during World War II and the Korean War, and innovation in improving medical care in Korea, specifically in treating tuberculosis and leprosy. Her leadership of the Severance hospital contributed to the development of Yonsei University. Additionally, the hospital she founded and led, the Wonju United Christian Hospital became the Yonsei University Mirae Campus. Recognized with several honorary degrees, she permanently returned to Canada in 1969, where she continued to share her passion for service through domestic projects and her memoirs.

== Early life ==
=== Personal life ===
Florence J. Murray was born February 16, 1894, in Pictou Landing, Nova Scotia and grew up in Lawrencetown and Earltown, rural Canadian towns. Her father was a Presbyterian minister and her mother was a teacher. Murray's parents supported her aspirations to become a physician despite gender norms at the time. Murray was the oldest of six children. Of her siblings Foster, Edward, Anna, Charles, and Alexander, the former three also became physicians. She never married or had children.

=== Education ===
Murray attended Prince of Wales College in Charlottetown, Prince Edward Island and then entered the Dalhousie University Medical College in 1914. While at Dalhousie University, she engaged in religious activities to prepare for mission work, including the Young Women's Christian Association (YWCA), Student Volunteer Movement, and serving as a Bible study group leader.

Murray was the 23rd woman to graduate from the Dalhousie University Medical College, as it was uncommon for women to attend co-educational medical schools. As a co-ed university, Dalhousie also had more resources and stronger training than female-only institutions at the time. Additionally, many male students enlisted to serve in World War I during her medical school years, leaving more opportunities for female students to gain experience.

After medical school, Murray applied for and was accepted to a paid internship at Long Island Hospital in Boston, but left shortly after to return to Halifax to work and train with a surgeon.

== Journey to mission work ==
=== Call ===
Murray was raised in a religious setting and had always intended on dedicating her life to service. As a child, she aspired to be a minister, but was refused by the church because of her gender. She was introduced to missionary work early on through her father's professional and social connections. Her father had wanted to serve abroad, but was denied. Murray was intrigued by the experiences of her father's friends, and after being introduced to the Student Volunteer Movement in college, decided to become a missionary. Her parents, who encouraged her to prioritize service in her career, were supportive of this decision.

=== Halifax Explosion ===
On December 6, 1917, a French cargo ship exploded in the harbor of Halifax, Nova Scotia. Now known as the Halifax Explosion, the event was the largest man-made explosion in history at the time. When Murray heard of the explosion, she headed to the YMCA emergency hospital in Halifax to assist. Murray was a fourth-year medical student and had almost no experience in anesthesia. After just a day of experience working with explosion victims, she was made the official anesthesiologist at the Halifax YMCA.

=== Spanish Flu ===
One year after the Halifax explosion, Nova Scotia was hit by the Spanish flu pandemic. When the doctor in Lockeport, Nova Scotia died of the flu, Murray was asked to help. She worked with the community to staff an emergency hospital and treat influenza patients.

Murray's volunteer efforts during the Halifax explosion and Spanish flu gave her practical experience for the demands of missionary work. After working briefly at the Halifax hospital to earn money for her family, she then turned to the Presbyterian Church of Canada to look for a position abroad. Dr. Kate McMillan, a mission doctor in Korea, had recently written to ask for assistance, so the mission board offered Murray the position and she accepted.

== Missionary service in Korea ==
In 1921 Murray left Halifax, Nova Scotia for Hamhung, Korea, where she eventually became superintendent of the Jehye Hospital. She was forced to return to Canada briefly during World War II but returned in 1946 when asked to establish a medical training program at Ewha Womans University in Seoul. In the years following the Korean War and before her return home, Murray taught and practiced medicine at Severance Hospital, established Wonju United Christian Hospital in the underserved Gangwon Province, and launched a mobile clinic system.

=== Early years in Hamhung and Longjing ===
Murray arrived in the Port of Busan on August 21, 1921. She spent her early days in Hamhung learning Korean, in which she initially struggled but became proficient over time. She was surprised at the condition of the Jehye Hospital run by Dr. McMillan, and felt that the staff was not responding appropriately. Soon after her arrival in Hamhung, Murray received word that Dr. Stanley H. Martin, the head of the Longjing Mission Hospital in Manchuria, was taking medical leave, and she was asked to take his place. Dr. Martin served the entire region and was responsible for 22,000 patients per year. In assuming Dr. Martin's post, Murray struggled to balance her language studies, hospital administration, and medicine, and often felt like she was losing touch with her medical practice.

In 1923, Dr. McMillan died and Murray was asked to return to Hamhung and lead the Jehye Hospital in her place. She re-designed the hospital with the help of monetary grants, focusing on building a new ward for tuberculosis patients, and reopened the hospital in 1925. During these early leadership experiences, Murray faced challenges due to her status as a female foreigner. For instance, nursing was not traditionally a well-respected profession for women in Korea. In Hamhung, Murray founded a three-year nursing program, which helped raised the status of nursing in Korea to a profession for talented and educated women. While she did not immediately adjust to her new cultural environment, she eventually became respected by colleagues and patients from both Korea and the West. In 1929, she was named the first president of the Medical Missionary Association of Korea. The Hamhung community later threw her a dinner party to celebrate the 20-year anniversary of her arrival in Korea.

=== World War II ===
As World War II escalated in Europe, Murray and other female missionaries were ordered to evacuate Korea in 1940. Murray requested an exemption and was permitted to keep working, which gave her time to prepare the Jehye Hospital to continue operating in her absence. She stepped down as hospital superintendent and appointed Dr. Pyung-kan Koh, a Korean physician, as the new superintendent in 1941. Murray also drew up plans for the allocation of empty beds left by evacuated Western staff and for training nurses to lead the tuberculosis ward. Additionally, during the final months before evacuation, Murray and Beulah Bourns, a Canadian nurse, received a ¥15,000 grant to continue expanding the tuberculosis ward. These preparations reflect Murray's long-term impact on the communities she served, which lasted longer than her physical presence.

In 1942, Murray was forced to return to Canada as part of an exchange with Japanese prisoners of war in the United States and Canada. On May 31, 1942, she left Hamhung for Lourenço Marques, Mozambique, where the exchange took place.

==== Professional Development ====
Throughout her career, Murray kept her own professional development as a priority, and her time back home in Canada during World War II was no different.

While working in Korea, Murray did not lower her standards as a physician even in challenging and resource-limited settings. She was intent on not only maintaining a high standard of care, but also on continually learning about new medical techniques: she frequently asked her mother to mail copies of the Canadian Medical Association Journal from home. These high expectations also created challenges. Especially at first, she hesitated to delegate work to the Hamhung community due to fear of lowering her standards.

Back in Canada in 1942, Murray continued to seek professional development by working in private practice. After learning that she could return to Korea, she began working at the Nova Scotia Sanatorium to gain further experience with tuberculosis. When Dr. Helen Kim, president of Ewha Womans University in Seoul, asked her to take on a teaching position upon her return, Murray traveled around the United States and Canada to visit nine medical colleges in preparation.

=== Post-World War II Years and the Korean War ===
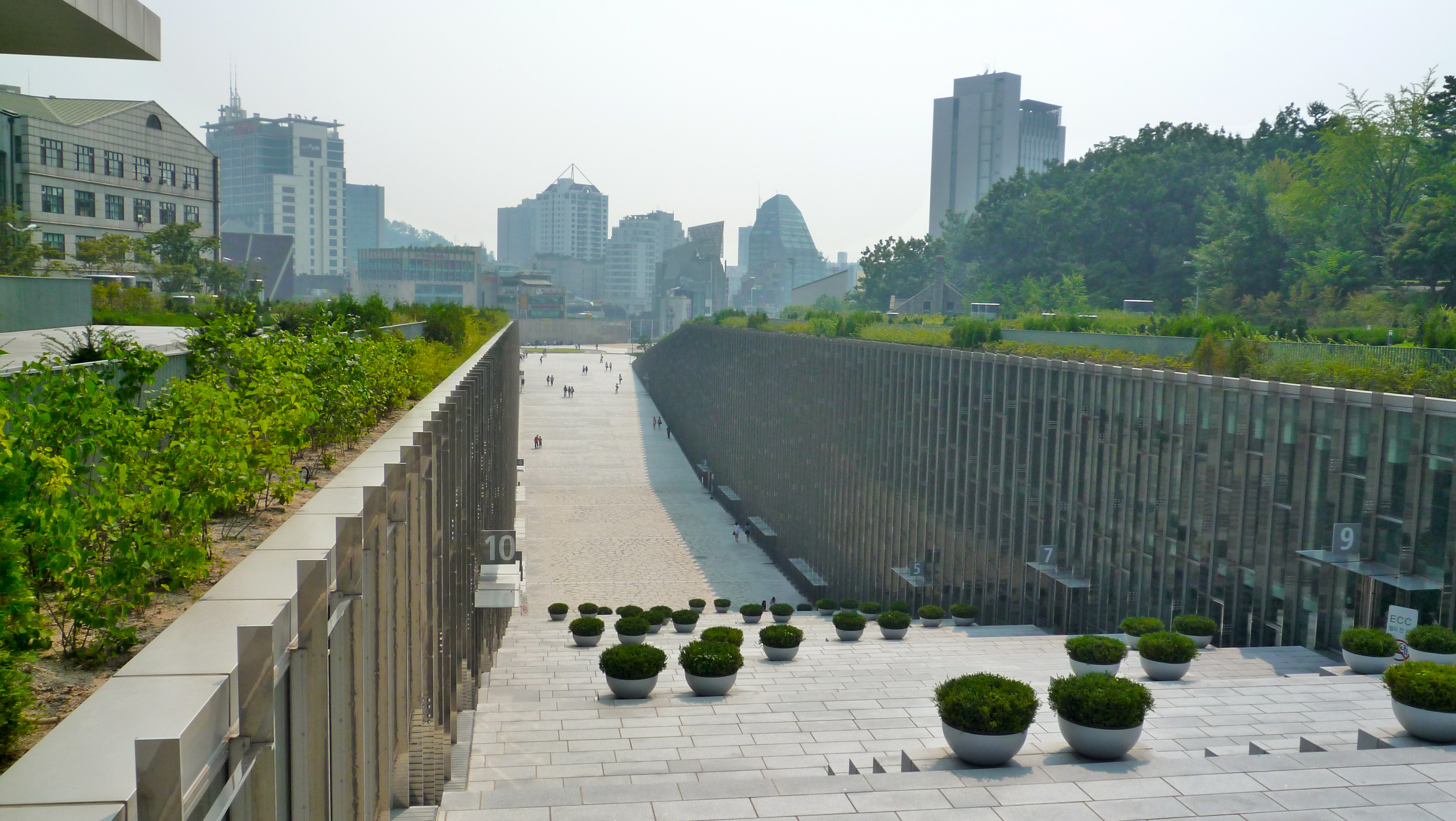
Ewha Womans University in Seoul, South Korea, where Murray worked to establish a medical college

After World War II, Murray could not return to Hamhung due to the division of Korea, so she arrived in Seoul in July 1947 for her teaching position at Ewha Womans University, now the largest female educational institute in the world. She was instrumental in the development of a medical training program at Ewha and served as dean and assistant superintendent. However, she did not agree with Dr. Kim's decision to keep the Ewha University medical program separate from the nearby Severance Hospital, instead favoring a co-ed merger. Murray felt that remaining independent meant limited resources for female trainees, and eventually left her position at Ewha. Murray began taking on roles at Severance and served on the Cooperation Board for Christian Higher Education, where she represented the hospital for funding requests. On the board, she advocated for several causes, including sending medical students for training abroad. During these early years at Severance, she also focused on heading a public health campaign about tuberculosis.

On June 25, 1950, the Korean War began, and Murray was again forced to return to Canada. Wanting to offer her support for refugees and injured soldiers, she traveled back to Korea in 1951 and worked with Beulah Bourns in relief efforts. She served as a translator for doctors on military hospital ships including the USS Consolation and the Danish ship MS Jutlandia, and later received a medal from the Danish government for her work.

In March 1952, Murray returned to Severance Hospital, which incurred damage during the war, to rebuild, teach, and practice medicine. She and Dr. Ernest Struthers worked to improve the quality of its medical teaching program. She was named acting superintendent of Severance in 1954. Under her leadership, received $400,000 from the United States Army to build a new surgical unit. Also under her leadership, Severance merged with Chosun Christian Hospital to form the prestigious Yonsei University.

As Murray neared 60 years of age, she stepped back from some of her previous responsibilities at Severance, but continued to serve in new ways. She revolutionized the medical records system at Severance, aiming to bring attention to the importance of record-keeping, and continued the project intermittently throughout her remaining years in Korea.

=== Service in Wonju ===
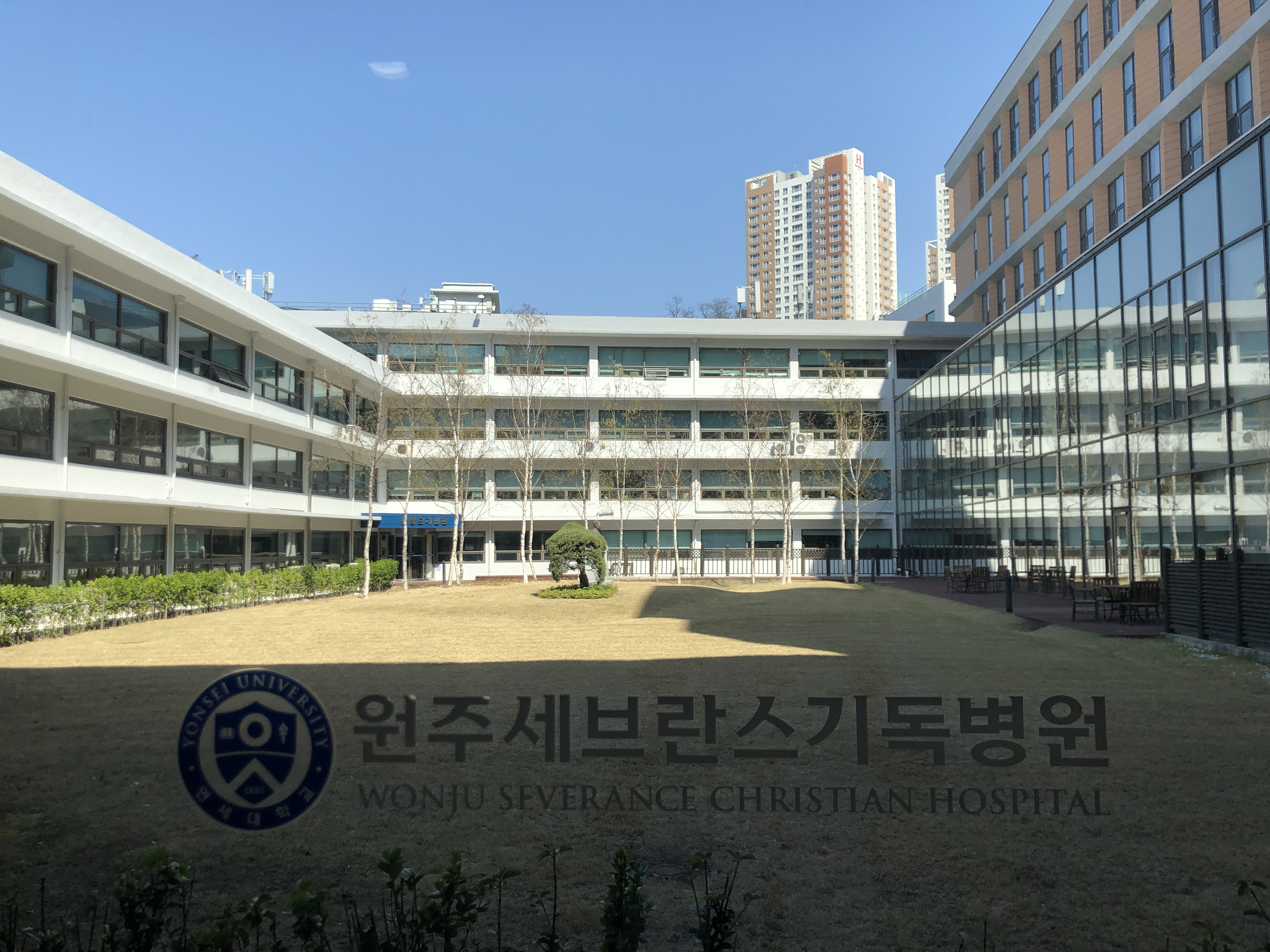
Wonju Christian Hospital, where Murray served as chairman during its establishment

Murray left Seoul in the final years of the 1950s for Gangwon-do, a province that was particularly affected by the Korean War. She decided that Wonju, the provincial capital, was to be the site for a hospital that was jointly financed by the Presbyterian Church of Canada and the United States Methodist Church. Murray was named chairman of the Wonju Union Christian Hospital Board and Building Committee. Murray reconstructed the Swedish Methodist Hospital, built in 1913 by Albin Garfield Anderson. The new hospital groundbreaking ceremony took place in 1957, and in November 1959 the hospital opened with 50 beds. The Wonju United Christian Hospital later merged with Yonsei University to become the Yonsei University Mirae Campus, and it still operates under the name Wonju Christian Hospital.

Murray also devoted herself to treating leprosy during her time in Wonju, where she founded a program to help patients and their families stay connected with resources and society. She founded a mobile clinic, and a nearby town was later named "Murray Village" in response to her contributions.

=== Retirement and return home ===
Murray officially retired in 1961, but her service in Korea continued. In 1962 she continued her work with leprosy by relocating to the Mission to Lepers in Daegu, Korea. Murray still continued to expand her knowledge as a physician and wrote to notify the Canadian Medical Association Journal of her address change to ensure she would still receive publications. She also began to use her knowledge for activism by drawing from her experiences to write articles advocating for long-term and community-oriented mission work.

After continuing her medical records work at Severance Hospital from 1964 to 1969, Murray returned to Nova Scotia for the last time. She continued to advocate for matters of diplomacy between Canada and Korea, and served as a mentor for Korean immigrants to Canada. She shared her own stories and experiences with mission work, but stayed open to newer secular forms of service and even volunteered for organizations like Oxfam. She also wrote her second book of memoirs, Return to Korea, in her retirement. Murray died in Pictou Landing, Nova Scotia, on April 14, 1975, at age 81.

=== Woman in medicine ===
Dr. Ruth Compton Brouwer has written extensively on Murray's missionary service in the context of feminism, gender, and professional roles for women at the time. Murray faced many challenges as a female physician, and it took time for her to build respect from her male colleagues. She cared for all patients, regardless of their gender, and defied the norm that female doctors should treat only female patients. Still, she did not believe in medical programs that trained women solely for the purpose of training more female doctors. Rather, she preferred training physicians based on merit to raise the quality of care in Korea, regardless of the genders of the physicians.

== Legacy ==
Murray's legacy lives on through Murray Village, a town named which dedicated its name to her, a memorial pagoda which was sent from Korea to Victoria University at the University of Toronto, and Yonsei University, whose Wonju Campus was developed around the hospital which Murray established.

She was awarded an honorary Doctor of Divinity from Pine Hill Divinity Hall, now merged with the Atlantic School of Theology, and was the first female recipient of this award. She also was awarded an honorary Legum Doctor degree from her alma mater, Dalhousie University.

Murray wrote two memoirs: At the Foot of Dragon Hill and Return to Korea. Her papers are archived in the Helen Fraser MacRae fonds in the Nova Scotia Archives, the Dalhousie University Archives, and the United Church of Canada Archives.
