= Lake View High School (Chicago) =

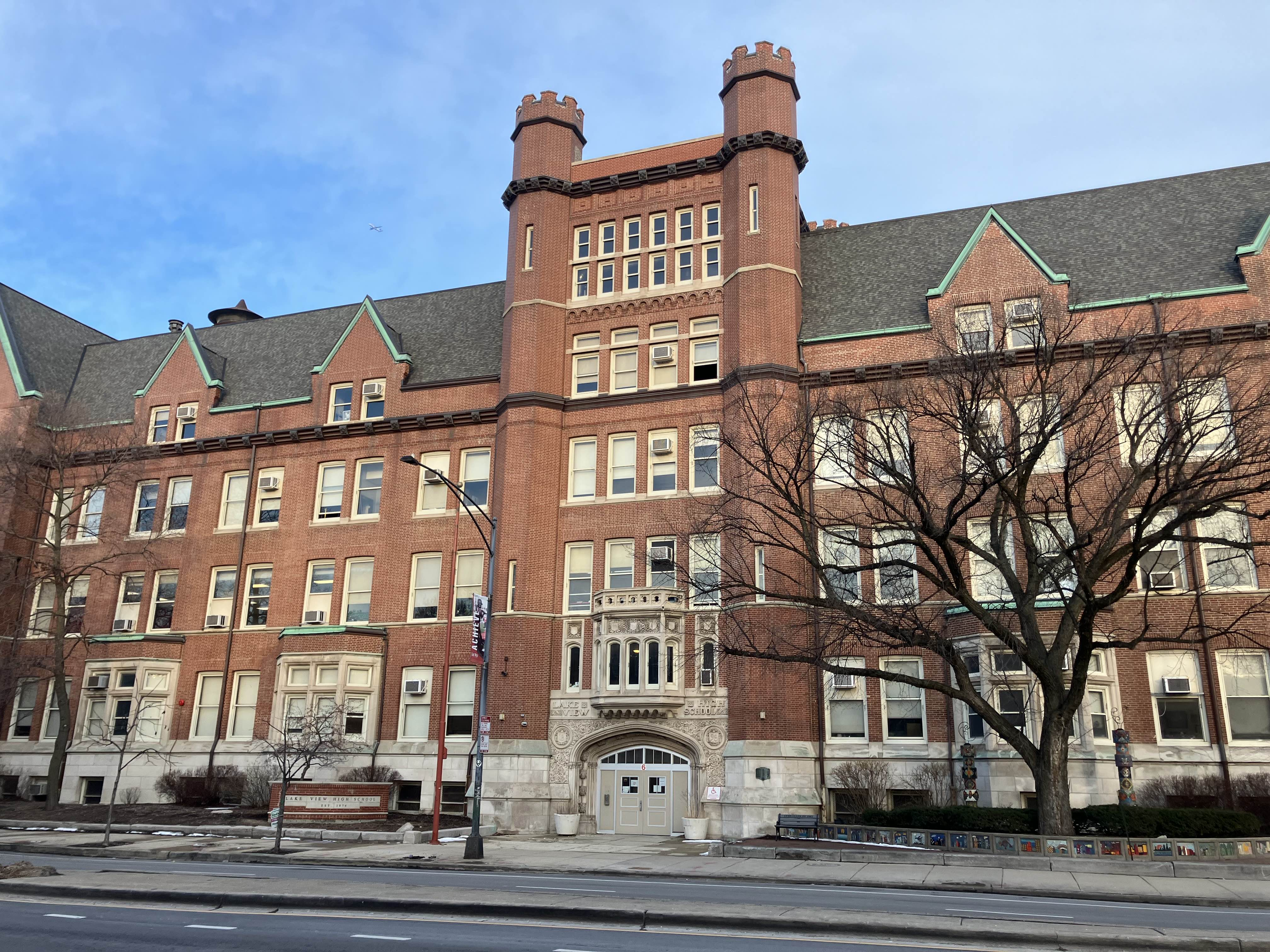

Location
- 4015 N. Ashland Avenue. Chicago, Illinois 60613; United States; 41.9554°N 87.6686°W

Information
- School type: Public secondary
- Motto: Ad astra per aspera "To the stars through difficulties"
- Opened: 1874; 1886 (current location)
- School district: Chicago Public Schools
- CEEB code: 140930
- Principal: Paul Joseph Karafiol
- Grades: 9–12
- Gender: Coed
- Enrollment: 1,287 (2015–16)
- Campus type: Urban
- Colors: Red; White
- Athletics conference: Chicago Public League
- Team name: Wildcats
- Accreditation: North Central Association of Colleges and Schools
- Newspaper: Lake reView
- Yearbook: Red & White
- Website: lakeviewhs.com

Lake View High School is a public four-year high school located in the Lake View neighborhood on the north side of Chicago, Illinois, United States. Lake View is a part of the Chicago Public Schools district. While the current building opened in 1886, the school itself opened in 1874, dating to a time when the Lake View community was not a part of the city of Chicago. Lake View became a part of Chicago in 1889. Created when the Lake View area was its own township before it joined Chicago, the school is the oldest operating township secondary school in the state of Illinois.

Parts of the film My Bodyguard were filmed at Lake View High School.

== Academics and activities ==
Lake View High School earned a bronze medal in the U.S. News/School Matters Best High School rankings.

The school offers approximately 20 clubs and activities for students. Among those which are chapters or branches of nationally notable organizations are National Honor Society and Key Club.

== Athletics ==
Lake View competes in the Chicago Public League (CPL), and is a member of the Illinois High School Association (IHSA). Teams are stylized as the Wildcats. The boys' track & field team finished second at the first IHSA State Meet in 1892–93, and its boys' soccer team finished fourth in the IHSA State Tournament in 2008–09.

In the years before World War Two, the school had a fifty-foot rifle range in the basement and fielded a rifle team.

== Feeder patterns ==
K-8 schools which feed into Lake View include Audubon, Bell, Blaine, Burley, Greeley, Hamilton, Jahn, Nettelhorst, and Schneider.

== Notable alumni ==
- Albin Garfield Anderson, medical missionary who spent 30 years caring for patients in Korea
- Clarence Applegran, football player who played for the Detroit Heralds in 1920
- Lee Balterman, photographer of ballet, sports and Chicago street scenes
- Edgar Bergen, ventriloquist, radio personality and actor; father of actress Candice Bergen
- Barbara Bedford, actress in films from 1920 to 1945
- Tom Bosley, Tony Award-winning actor, best known for his work on television (Happy Days, Father Dowling Mysteries and Murder, She Wrote)
- Alfred Caldwell, landscape architect
- Shirley Bell Cole, radio actress, best known for portraying Little Orphan Annie
- Naomi Pollard Dobson, librarian and educator, first Black woman to graduate from Northwestern University
- Moses Gomberg, chemist
- Myron Hunt, architect whose work included the Rose Bowl
- Leo Koretz, lawyer and stockbroker who ran an elaborate Ponzi scheme
- Mark LaValle, Olympic weightlifter
- Vince Lawrence, platinum award-winning dance music producer, businessman and a leading innovator of house music
- Joe Mooshil, former Associated Press sportswriter and speaker on The Sportswriters on TV
- Gladys Nilsson, artist and original member of the Hairy Who group of Chicago Imagists
- Tom Rosenberg, film producer
- Howard Rubenstein, 1949, physician, photographer, playwright
- Jasper Sanfilippo Sr., leader of John B. Sanfilippo & Son, Inc. nut business, collector and philanthropist
- Abe Saperstein, founder, owner, and coach of the Harlem Globetrotters.
- Stuart Schwartz, television producer
- Gloria Swanson, Golden Globe award-winning actress who played Norma Desmond in the film Sunset Boulevard
- Richard Thieme (class of 1961), priest, consultant, and author
- Bryant Washburn, actor
- Sidney R. Yates, U.S. Representative (1949–63, 1965–99) for Illinois' 9th congressional district
