= Hoengseong station =

Railway station in South Korea

횡성
Hoengseong
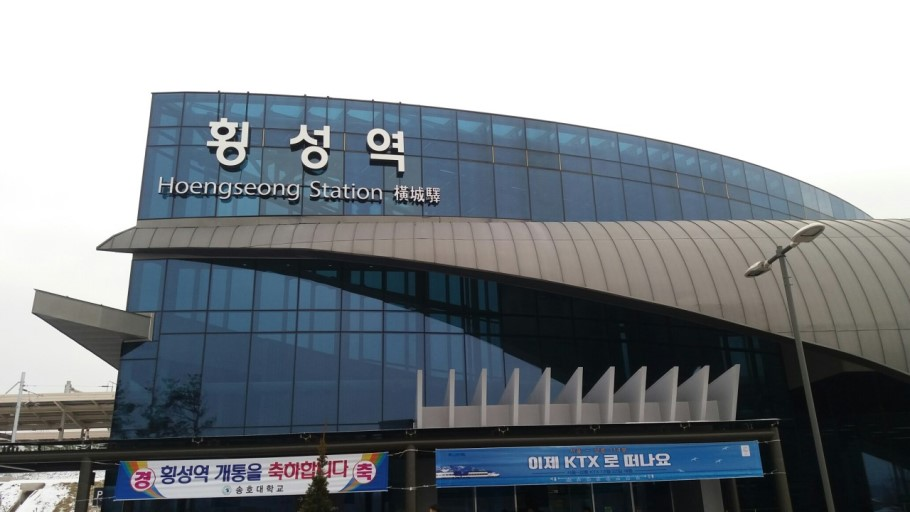

Korean name
- Hangul: 횡성역
- Hanja: 橫城驛
- RR: Hoengseong-yeok
- MR: Hoengsŏng-yŏk

General information
- Location: Hoengseong-eup; Hoengseong-gun, Gangwon-do, South Korea
- Coordinates: 37°28′58″N 128°0′37″E
- Operator: Korail
- Line: Gangneung Line

Construction
- Structure type: Elevated

History
- Opened: December 22, 2017

Services
Preceding station	Korea Train Express	Following station
Manjong towards Haengsin or Seoul	Gangneung KTX	Dunnae towards Donghae or Gangneung
Location

Hoengseong station is a railway station in Hoengseong-eup, Hoengseong, South Korea. It is served by the Gangneung Line. The station opened on 22 December 2017, ahead of the 2018 Winter Olympics.
