= Deokgasan (Gangwon) =

Mountain in South Korea

Highest point
- Elevation: 832 m (2,730 ft)

Geography
- Location: South Korea

Korean name
- Hangul: 덕가산
- Hanja: 德加山
- RR: Deokgasan
- MR: Tŏkkasan

Deokgasan (Korean: 덕가산) is a mountain in Wonju, Gangwon Province, South Korea. It has an elevation of 832 m (2,730 ft).

== See also ==
- List of mountains in Korea
