= Nettelhorst School =

Public K-8 school in Chicago, U.S.

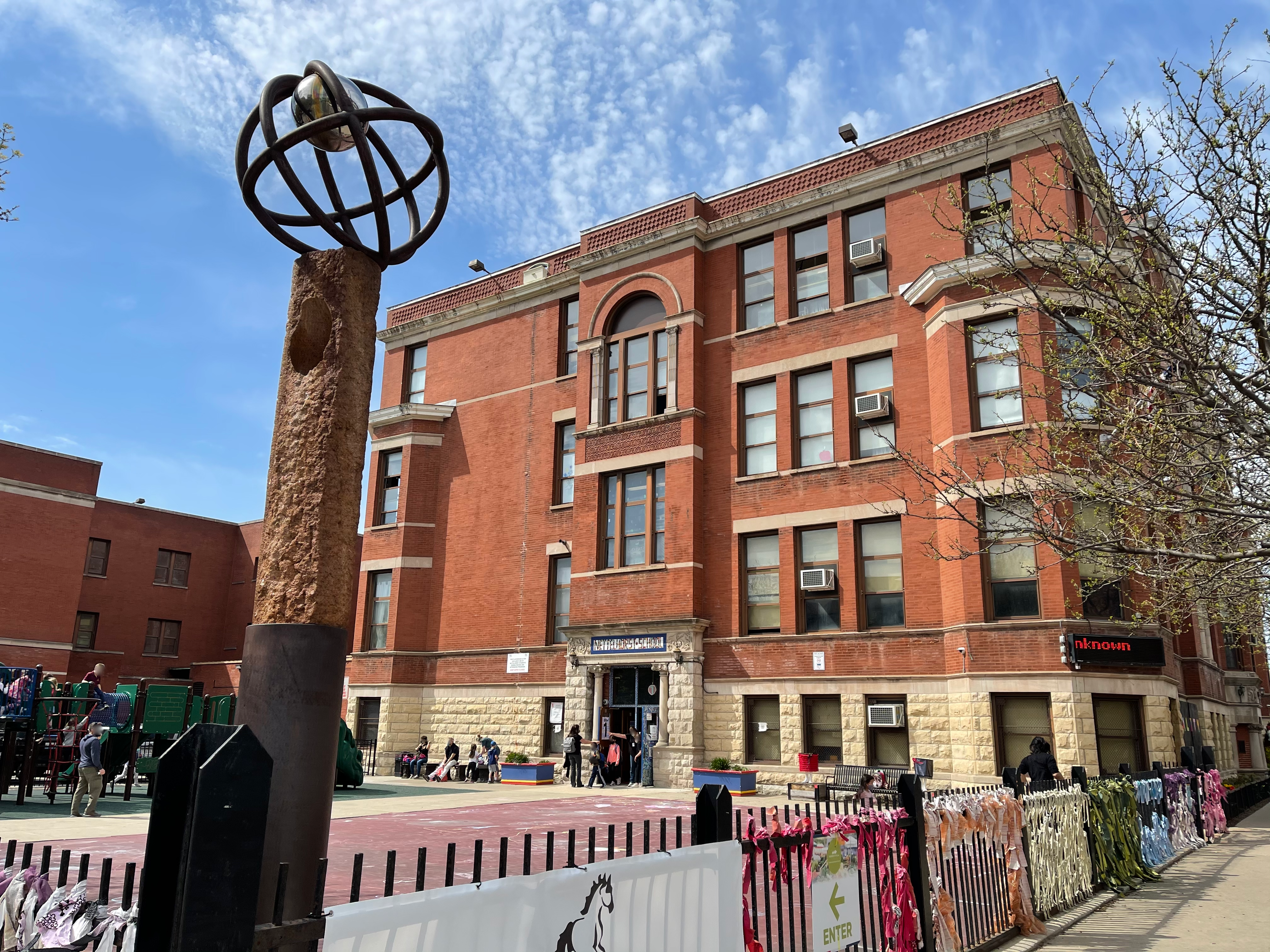

Location
- 3252 North Broadway Ave. Chicago, Illinois 60657; United States; 41°56′30″N 87°38′41″W

Information
- School type: Public K-8
- Opened: 1892
- School district: Chicago Public Schools
- Principal: Yasmeen Muhammad
- Grades: K-8
- Gender: Coed
- Campus type: Urban
- Website: nettelhorst.org

Louis B. Nettelhorst Elementary School is a public K-8 school in Lake View, Chicago. It is a part of the Chicago Public Schools (CPS) school district.

Its namesake is Louis Nettelhorst Sr., a German immigrant who once headed the Chicago Board of Education from 1888 to 1892. An 1893 Chicago Tribune article described him as "one of the most popular German-American citizens of Chicago".

== History ==
It first opened in 1892. For many decades Nettelhorst had a good reputation. In the 1950s its reputation began to decline. Around 2000, few Lake View parents enrolled their children in Nettelhorst and the school had low test scores. Children from other Chicago elementary schools that had too many students had been sent to Nettelhorst instead.

In 2001 parent Jacqueline Edelberg met with principal Susan Kurland. Edelberg desired to enroll her children in a neighborhood elementary school instead of doing so at a private school, going into a magnet school application process, and/or moving to the suburbs. Kurland asked Edelberg what it would take for her to place her children in Nettelhorst. After Kurland accepted Edelberg's demands, Edelberg established a parental group, "Roscoe Eight", for the purpose of improving Nettelhorst; it was named after a playlot on Roscoe Street. The parental group advertised Nettelhorst, beautified the campus, and organized committees to address specific aspects of the school. Parents personally painted corridors of the school.

By 2003 CPS chose Nettelhorst to become a "community school" in an effort to lure families back to CPS, and a community enrichment class program called Jane's Place, as part of a partnership with the Jane Addams Hull House Association, opened at Nettelhorst.

By 2009 families moved to Nettelhorst's attendance zone for the express purpose of enrolling their children there, and the school's academic performance had improved significantly. Edelberg and Kurland later wrote a book about her experiences, titled How to Walk to School. The authors argued that the manner of grassroot-style fundraising and activism for Nettelhorst may be used to improve other American schools.

== Student body ==
In 2011 the school had 632 students. In 2010 31% of the students were classified as low income. In 2001 77% of the students were low income. In 2003 it had 380 students.

== Academic performance ==
In 2010 86% of Nettelhorst students were at or above the Illinois academic standard level. In 2001 35% were at or above that level.

== Campus ==
The school includes a cafeteria that uses a French bistro theme along with a kitchen designed by Nate Berkus; the kitchen had a cost of $130,000.

One classroom has a 1940 mural done by Ethel Spears and commissioned by the Works Progress Administration, Horses from Literature. The Chicago Board of Education had the mural restored in 1996.

== Feeder pattern ==
Students zoned to Nettelhorst are also zoned to Lake View High School.
