= Chiaksan =

Mountain in South Korea

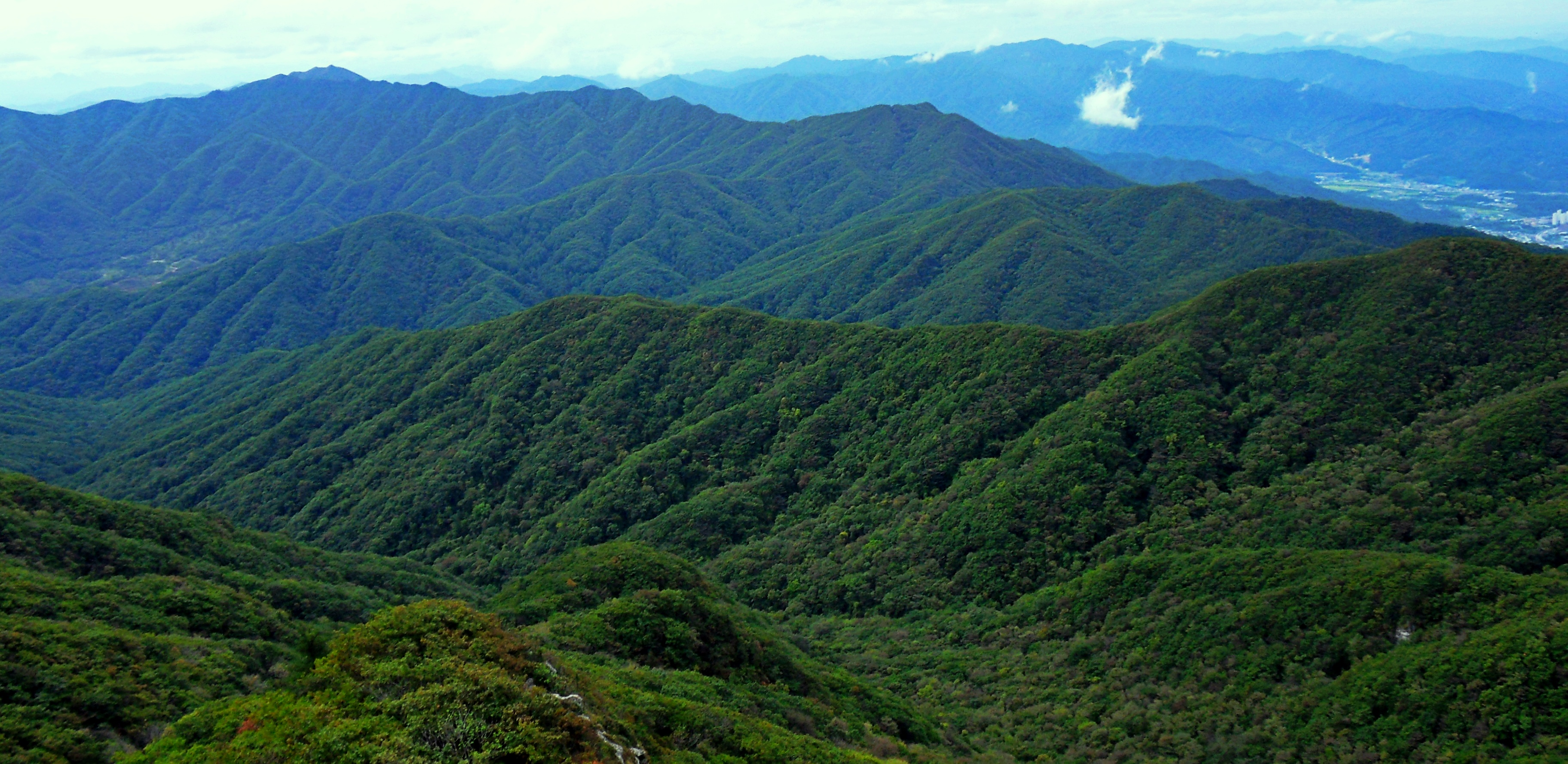

Highest point
- Elevation: 1,288 m (4,226 ft)
- Listing: Mountains of Korea
- Coordinates: 37°22′18″N 128°03′02″E

Geography
- Country: South Korea
- Province: Gangwon

Climbing
- Easiest route: North Korea

Korean name
- Hangul: 치악산
- Hanja: 雉岳山
- RR: Chiaksan
- MR: Ch'iaksan

Chiaksan (Korean: 치악산) is a mountain in Gangwon Province, South Korea, South Korea. Its area extends across Wonju and Hoengseong County. Chiaksan has an elevation of 1,288 m (4,226 ft).
