= Battle of Wonju =

Three battles of the Korean War fought in and around the town of Wonju are known as the Battle of Wonju:

- First and Second Battles of Wonju, North Korean People's Army attempted to capture Wonju in January 1951
- Third Battle of Wonju, Chinese People's Volunteer Army attempted to capture Wonju in February 1951
