= Dunnae station =

Railway station in Dunnae-myeon, Hoengseong, South Korea

둔내
Dunnae
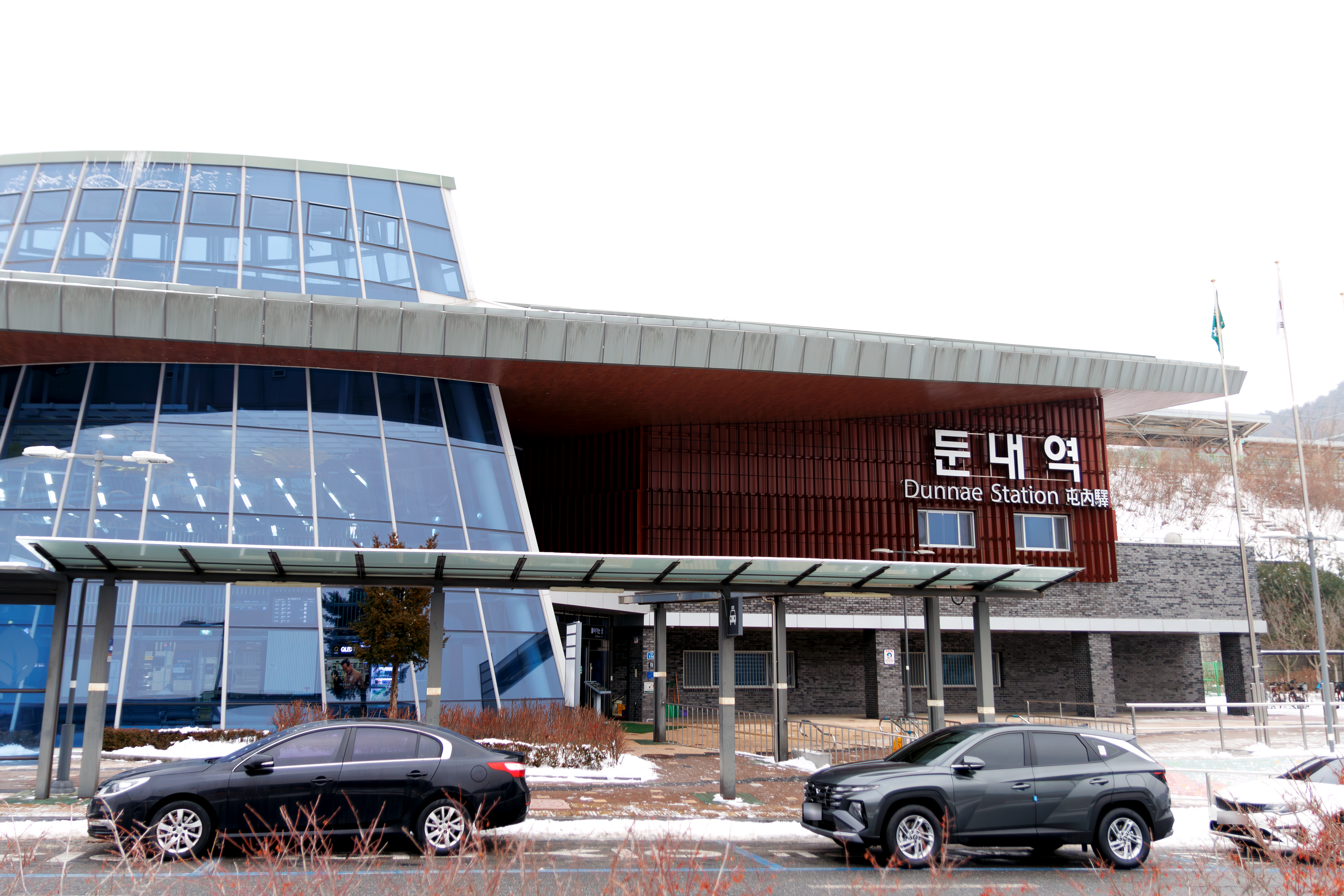

Korean name
- Hangul: 둔내역
- Hanja: 屯內驛
- Revised Romanization: Dunnae-yeok
- McCune–Reischauer: Tunnae-yŏk

General information
- Location: Dunnae-myeon; Hoengseong-gun, Gangwon-do, South Korea
- Coordinates: 37°30′36″N 128°13′16″E
- Operator: Korail
- Line: Gangneung Line

Construction
- Structure type: Elevated

History
- Opened: December 22, 2017

Services
Preceding station	Korea Train Express	Following station
Hoengseong towards Haengsin or Seoul	Gangneung KTX	Pyeongchang towards Donghae or Gangneung
Location

Dunnae station, is a railway station in Dunnae-myeon, Hoengseong, South Korea. It is served by the Gangneung Line. The station opened on 22 December 2017, ahead of the 2018 Winter Olympics.
