= Manjong station =

Railway station in Hojeo-myeon, Wonju, South Korea

만종
Manjong
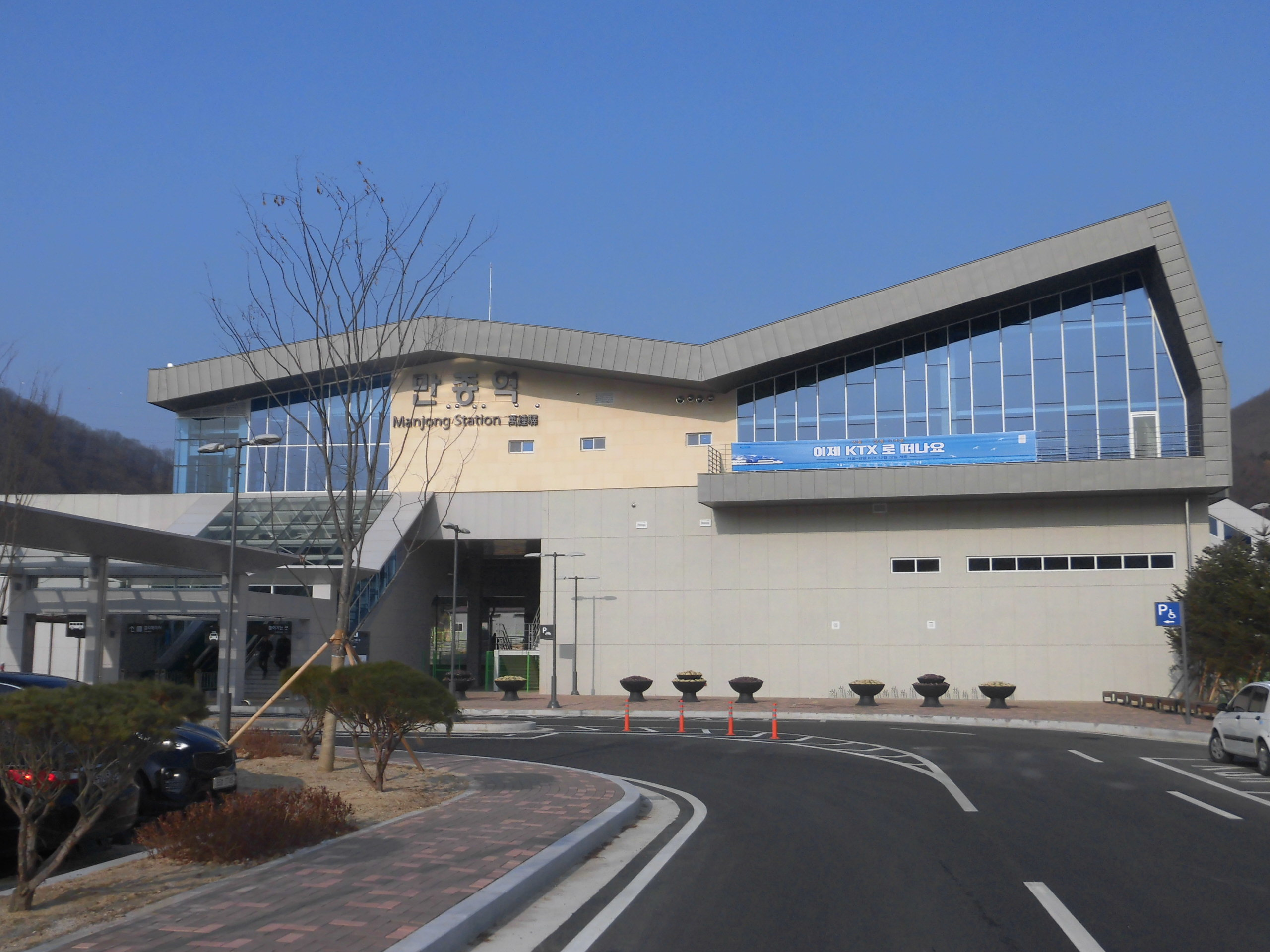

Korean name
- Hangul: 만종역
- Hanja: 萬鍾驛
- RR: Manjong-yeok
- MR: Manjong-yŏk

General information
- Location: Hojeo-myeon; Wonju-si, Gangwon-do, South Korea
- Coordinates: 37°21′23″N 127°53′47″E
- Operator: Korail
- Line: Gangneung Line
- Platforms: 2
- Tracks: 6

Construction
- Structure type: Ground

Key dates
- September 1, 1942: Jungang Line opened
- June 1, 2007: Station closed
- December 22, 2017: Gangneung Line opened alongside the re-opening of the station (ahead of the 2018 Winter Olympics)
- January 5, 2021: All Jungang Line services closed at Manjong due to double track electrification opening between Wonju and Jecheon

Services
Preceding station	Korea Train Express	Following station
Seowonju towards Haengsin or Seoul	Gangneung KTX	Hoengseong towards Donghae or Gangneung
Location

Manjong station, is a railway station in Hojeo-myeon, Wonju, South Korea. It is served by the Gangneung Line. The station opened on 1 September 1942.
