= Chai-Sik Chung =

American sociologist of religion (1930–2022)

- Born: July 14, 1930; Wonju, Korea
- Died: April 2022 (aged 91); Boston, Massachusetts, U.S.
- Citizenship: United States
- Occupations: Social ethicist, sociologist of religion
- Employer: Boston University

Korean name
- Hangul: 정재식
- Hanja: 鄭載植
- RR: Jeong Jaesik
- MR: Chŏng Chaesik

Chai-Sik Chung (July 14, 1930 – April 2022) was a Korean-born American social ethicist and sociologist of religion.

== Life and career ==
He studied under Walter George Muelder at the Boston University School of Theology, where he served as the Walter G. Muelder Professor of Social Ethics from 1990 to 2011. He also studied under the late Robert N. Bellah at Harvard Divinity School with whom he had been long associated.

As a scholar of comparative religious ethics, he worked in the study of social and ethical problems arising from East Asia's modern transformation. He has published widely in both Korean and English, on social and ethical issues involving globalization and encounters between civilizations, particularly those between Korea, East Asian religious traditions and Christianity. His publications include A Korean Confucian Encounter with the Modern World; Korea, Religious Tradition, and Globalization; Consciousness and History: Korean Cultural Tradition and Social Change; Korean Religion and Society Under Challenge: Continuity and Change; The Clash between Korean Confucianism and Modern Western Civilization; and his culminating work The Korean Tradition of Religion, Society, and Ethics: A Comparative Historical Interpretation and Looking Beyond.

Chung taught at a number of institutions, including Boston University's College of General Studies and in the Department of Sociology and the Graduate School of International Studies at Yonsei University in Seoul, South Korea. From 1983 to 1987, he served as Director of the Institute of Humanities at Yonsei. In 1986, he served as the Koret Visiting professor in the Department of Sociology at the University of California, Berkeley. In 2003, he was the Luce Distinguished Professor of Korean Christianity at the University of California, Los Angeles and in the following year he served as the Yongjae George L. Paik Distinguished Professor at Yonsei University. In 2011, he retired from the Boston University School of Theology, completing a 50-year teaching career.

Chung died in Boston, Massachusetts in April 2022, at the age of 91.
