= Britannicus (play) =

Tragic play by the French dramatist Jean Racine

Britannicus, 1670 (book in DjVu format)

Britannicus is a five-act tragic play by the French dramatist Jean Racine. It was first performed on 13 December 1669 at the Hôtel de Bourgogne in Paris.

Britannicus is the first play in which Racine depicted Roman history. The tale of moral choice takes as its subject Britannicus, the son of the Roman emperor Claudius, and heir to the imperial throne. Britannicus' succession to the throne is however usurped by Lucius, later known as Nero, and the son of Claudius' wife Agrippina the Younger.

Racine portrays Nero's true nature as revealed by his sudden desire for Britannicus's fiancée Junia. He wrests himself free from his mother's domination and plots to assassinate his adoptive brother. Nero is driven less by fear of being overthrown by Britannicus than by competition in love. His desire for Junia manifests itself in sadism towards the young woman and all that she loves. Agrippina is portrayed as a possessive mother who will not accept the loss of control over both her son and the Empire. Despite giving his name to the play, the character of Britannicus is more minor than those of Agrippina and Nero.

Success only came to the play slowly, but of Racine's works, Britannicus is today second only to Andromaque amongst the repertory of the Comédie-Française, and is frequently studied in high school.

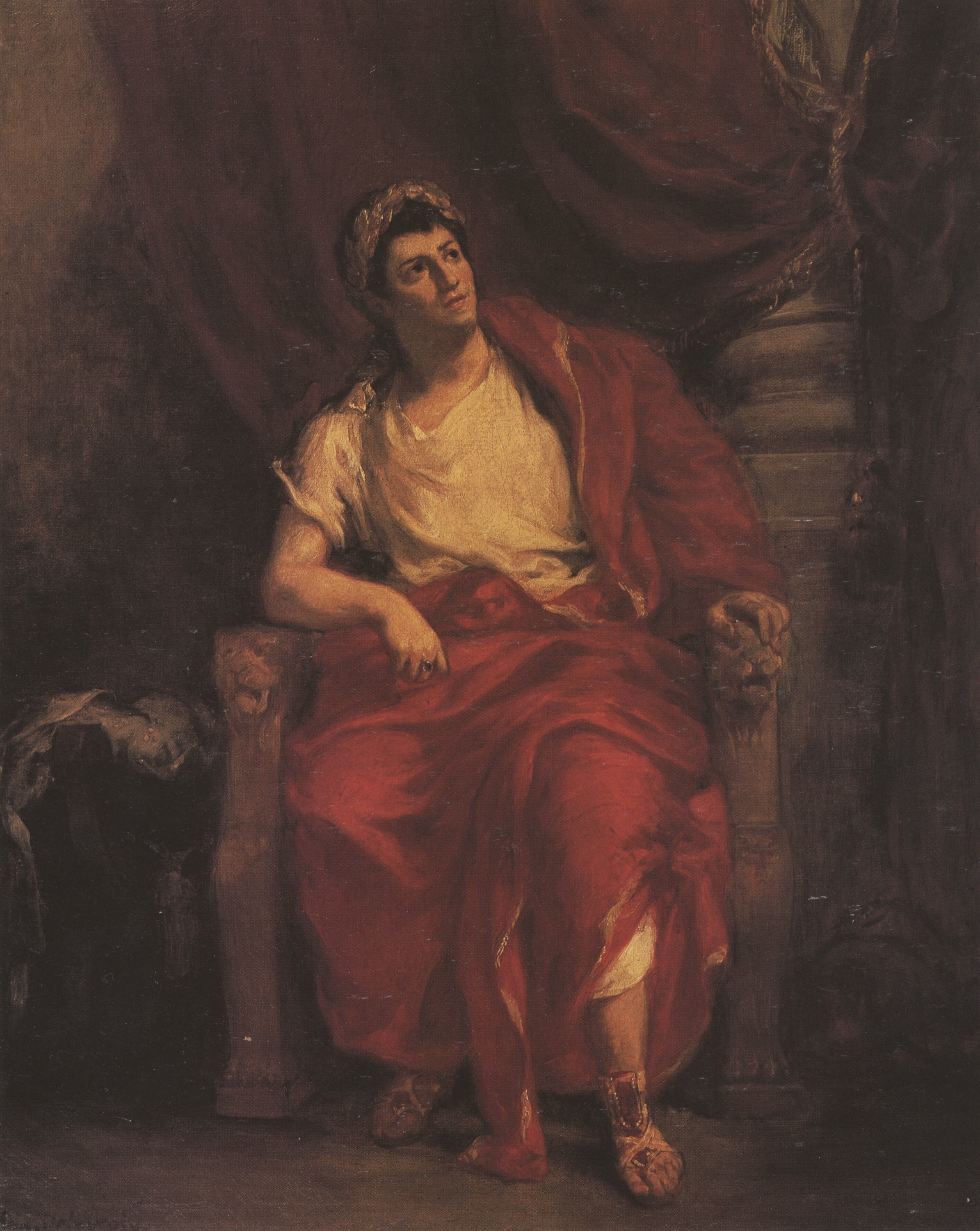
Talma as Nero, painted by Eugène Delacroix

== Roles ==
Role names and descriptions are from the first edition.

- Nero, Emperor, son of Agrippine
- Britannicus, son of the Emperor Claudius
- Agrippine, widow of Domitius Enobarbus father of Nero, & from second marriage, widow of Emperor Claudius
- Junie, beloved of Britannicus, granddaughter of Augustus
- Burrhus, tutor of Nero
- Narcisse, tutor of Britannicus
- Albine, confidante of Agrippine
- Guards

== Modern performances ==
A modern translation-adaptation of the play has been published and premiered by the American playwright Howard Rubenstein.

Britannicus was given by London's Almeida Theatre at the Brooklyn Academy of Music in 1999. Dame Diana Rigg played Agrippina and Toby Stephens, her son, Nero. It was directed by Jonathan Kent, using Robert David MacDonald's translation.

In 2011, Compass Theater premiered Howard Rubenstein's translation in San Diego. Glynn Bedington played Agrippina. The translation and Bedington's performance got rave reviews.

The Xoregos Performing Company performed the play at Theater for the New City in 2018 in New York City using Howard Rubenstein's translation/adaptation.

The play was performed in 2022 at the Lyric Hammersmith Theatre in London with a translation and adaption by Timberlake Wertenbaker.
