= Pyeongchang station =

Railway station operated by Gangneung Line

평창
Pyeongchang
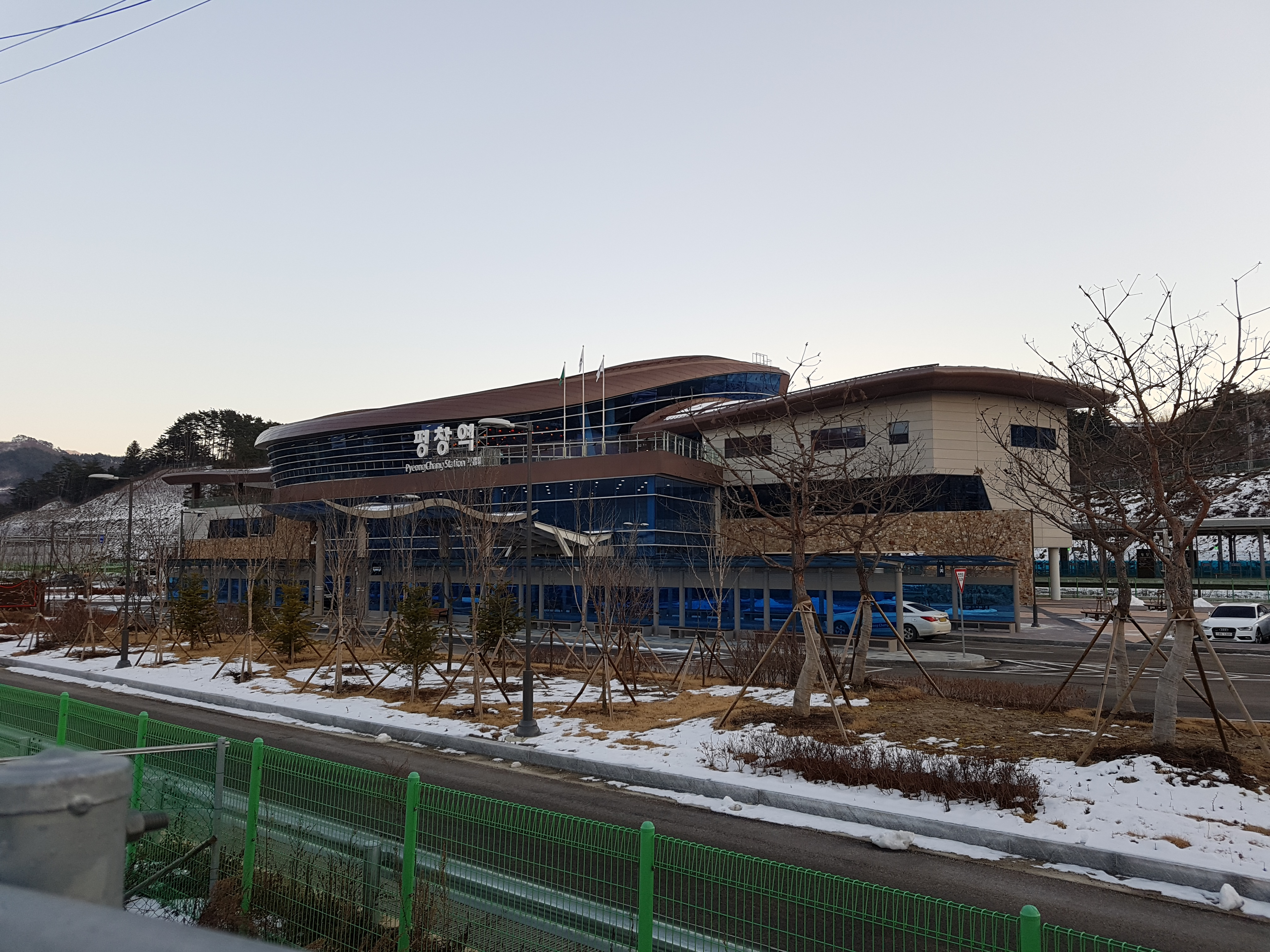

Korean name
- Hangul: 평창역
- Hanja: 平昌驛
- RR: Pyeongchang-yeok
- MR: P'yŏngch'ang-yŏk

General information
- Location: 1715 Pyeonchang-dong, Yongpyeong-myeon; Pyeongchang-gun, Gangwon-do, South Korea
- Coordinates: 37°33′44″N 128°25′48″E
- Operator: Korail
- Line: Gangneung Line

Construction
- Structure type: Elevated

History
- Opened: 22 December 2017

Services
Preceding station	Korea Train Express	Following station
Dunnae towards Haengsin or Seoul	Gangneung KTX	Jinbu towards Donghae or Gangneung
Location

Pyeongchang station is a railway station in Yongpyeong-myeon, Pyeongchang, South Korea. It is served by the Gangneung Line. The station opened on 22 December 2017, ahead of the 2018 Winter Olympics.

== Features ==
The station name is Pyeongchang, but it is more than 20 km away from Pyeongchang-eup, and there is a station between Yeongdong Expressway Pyeongchang Crossroad and Seoul National University Pyeongchang campus.

== Platform ==
This station has 2 platforms and 4 tracks.

1·2	Gangneung Line KTX	Jinbu(Odaesan) / for Gangneung
3·4	Gangneung Line KTX	Dunnae, Cheongnyangni · for Haengsin

== Footnotes ==
1. ↑ Minis (平昌驛) the try of Land, Transport and Communications Notice 2017-428, June 29, 2017.
