= Howard Rubenstein (physician) =

American physician, playwright, and translator (1931–2020)

Howard S. Rubenstein (1931 – September 20, 2020) was an American physician, playwright and translator of classical Greek drama.

== Life and works ==
Rubenstein was born in 1931 in Chicago and attended Lake View High School. He was a magna cum laude graduate of Carleton College, where he was elected to Phi Beta Kappa and Sigma Xi and won the Noyes Prize for excellence in ancient Greek studies. He received his MD degree from Harvard Medical School in 1957 and was a physician for over 40 years, most of them at Harvard University. For several years, he was a medical consultant for the State of California.

After retiring from the practice of medicine, he lived with his wife Judy in San Diego, where he wrote.

He published translations of Agamemnon by Aeschylus and The Trojan Women by Euripides. His translations were praised by the classical scholars P. E. Easterling and Oliver Taplin. The production of his adaptation of The Trojan Women won more Billie Awards (San Diego Playbill) than any other play of the 2000-1 San Diego theater season.

He also published stage adaptations of Jean Racine's Britannicus and the 20th century Yiddish dramatic poem, The Golem, by H. Leivick.

He wrote an historical comic tragedy Tony and Cleo and "Maccabee" an epic poem in free verse based upon the books of Maccabees.

He also wrote SHILOH: A Narrative Play, The Defiant Soul, and Romance of the Western Chamber—a Musical (Book and Lyrics) with Music by Max Lee, based on the classic Chinese comedy XI Xiang Ji; World Premiere in Rubenstein's English (with Mandarin supertitles), Dongpo Theatre, Hangzhou, China 2011; Western Premiere, TADA! Theater, off-off Broadway, 2017; west coast USA premiere, Poway Center for the Performing Arts, San Diego, January 2023.

Rubenstein died of metastatic cancer at the age of 89 on September 20, 2020. His adaptation of Prometheus Bound by Aeschylus premiered posthumously at The Tank in March 2021.

== Selected works ==
- Agamemnon: A play by Aeschylus translated from the Greek into English with reconstructed stage directions, introduction, notes and synopsis, Granite Hills Press, 1998. ISBN 0-9638886-4-1
- The Trojan Women: A play by Euripides; translated from the Greek into English and adapted in response to Aristophanes’ and Aristotle's criticism, Granite Hills Press, 2002. ISBN 1-929468-05-9
- Britannicus: A play in two acts, adapted from Jean Racine's Britannicus, Granite Hills Press, 2009. ISBN 978-1-929468-14-0
- The Golem: Man of Earth: A play in two acts based on historical events, a medieval Jewish legend, kabbalah, and the Yiddish dramatic poem by H. Leivick, Granite Hills Press, 2007. ISBN 978-1-929468-12-6 ISBN 1-929468-12-1
- Tony and Cleo: A play in two acts, Granite Hills Press, 2008. ISBN 978-1-929468-13-3
- Maccabee: An epic poem in free verse based upon the books of Maccabees, Granite Hills Press, 2004.ISBN 1929468083
