= Deokgasan (Goesan) =

Mountain in South Korea

Deokgasan (Chungcheongbuk-do)

Geography
- Location: North Chungcheong Province, South Korea

Korean name
- Hangul: 덕가산
- Hanja: 德加山
- RR: Deokgasan
- MR: Tŏkkasan

Deokgasan (Korean: 덕가산) is a mountain of North Chungcheong Province, South Korea. It has an altitude of 858 metres

== See also ==
- List of mountains of Korea
