= Yonsei University Mirae Campus =

University campus in MIRAE, South Korea

Coordinates: 37°16′45.9″N 127°54′5.4″E

- 연세대학교 미래캠퍼스
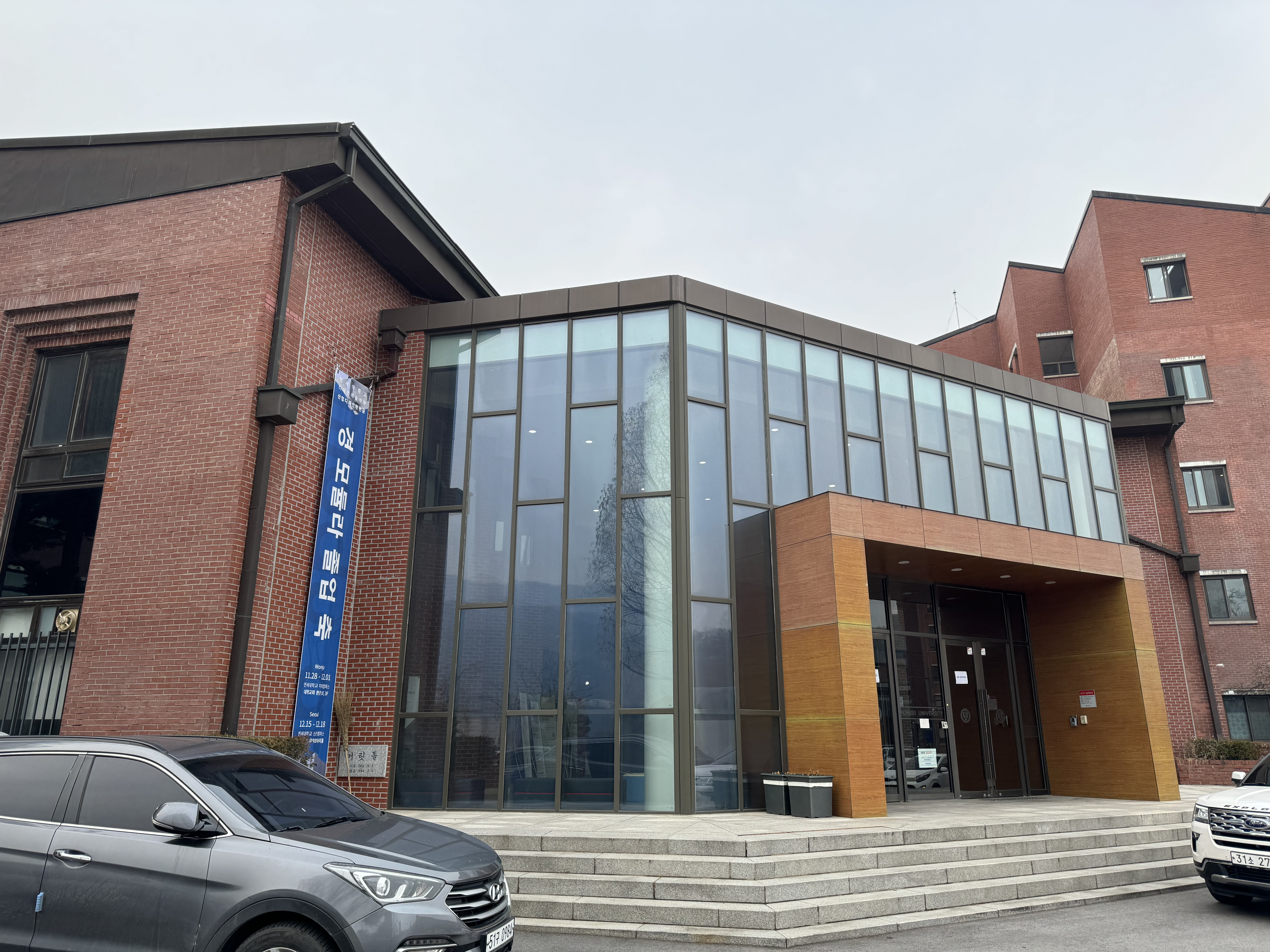
- Type: Private
- Established: 1978
- President: Yong-Hak Kim
- Academic staff: 383 (2018)
- Students: 7,414 (2018)
- Undergraduates: 6,993 (2018)
- Postgraduates: 421 (2018)
- Location: Wonju, Gangwon Province, South Korea
- Campus: suburban
- Colors: Royal blue
- Mascot: Eagle
- Website: www.yonsei.ac.kr/en_wj/

Yonsei University Mirae Campus is Yonsei University's satellite campus. It was established in Wonju, South Korea in 1978.

The campus was created from the merger of Wonju Christian Hospital and Yonsei University. The Wonju Christian Hospital was established from the reconstruction of the Swedish Methodist Hospital which was originally founded by Albin Garfield Anderson.
