= Wonju =

City in Gangwon, South Korea

- Municipal city
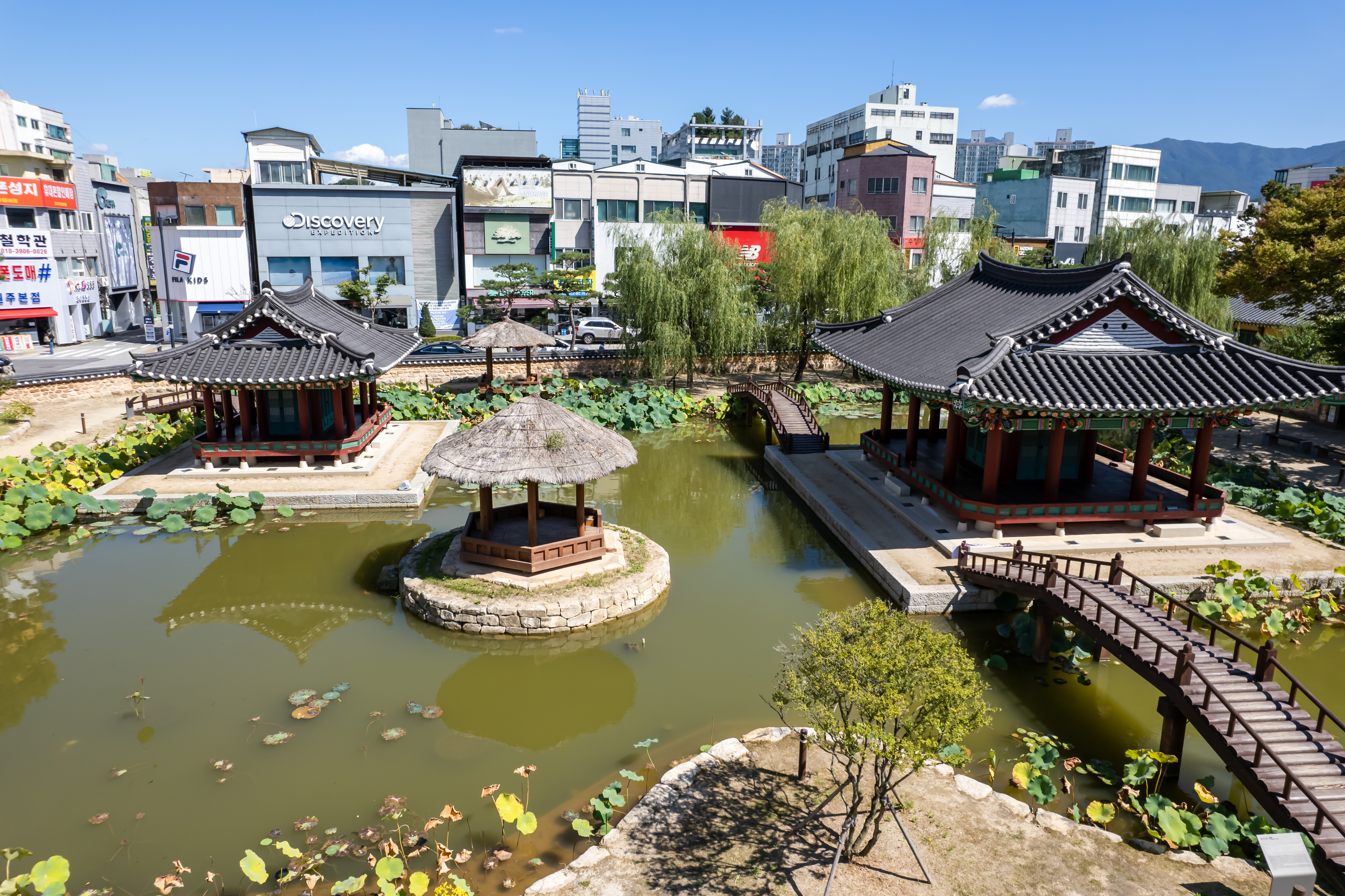
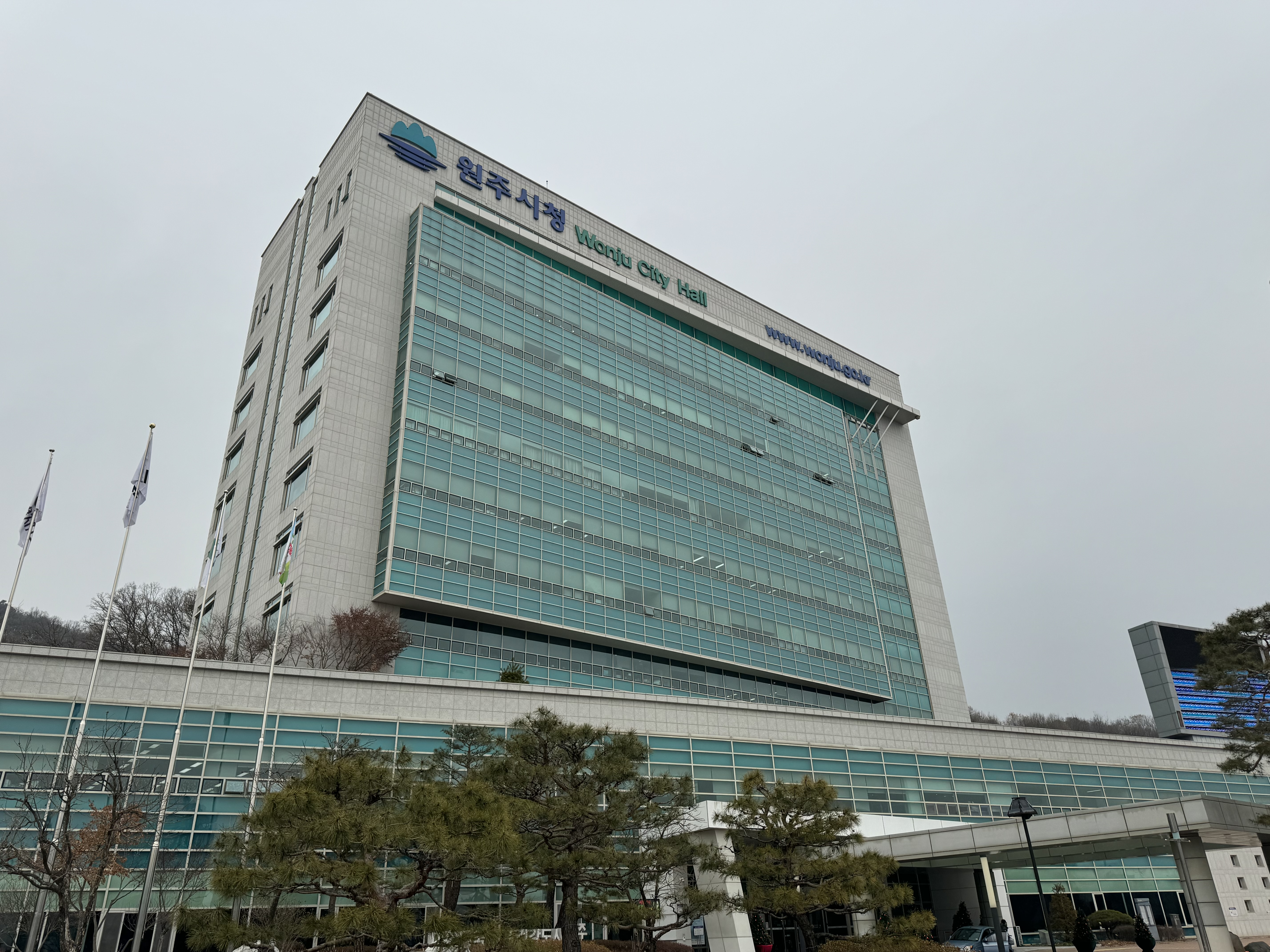
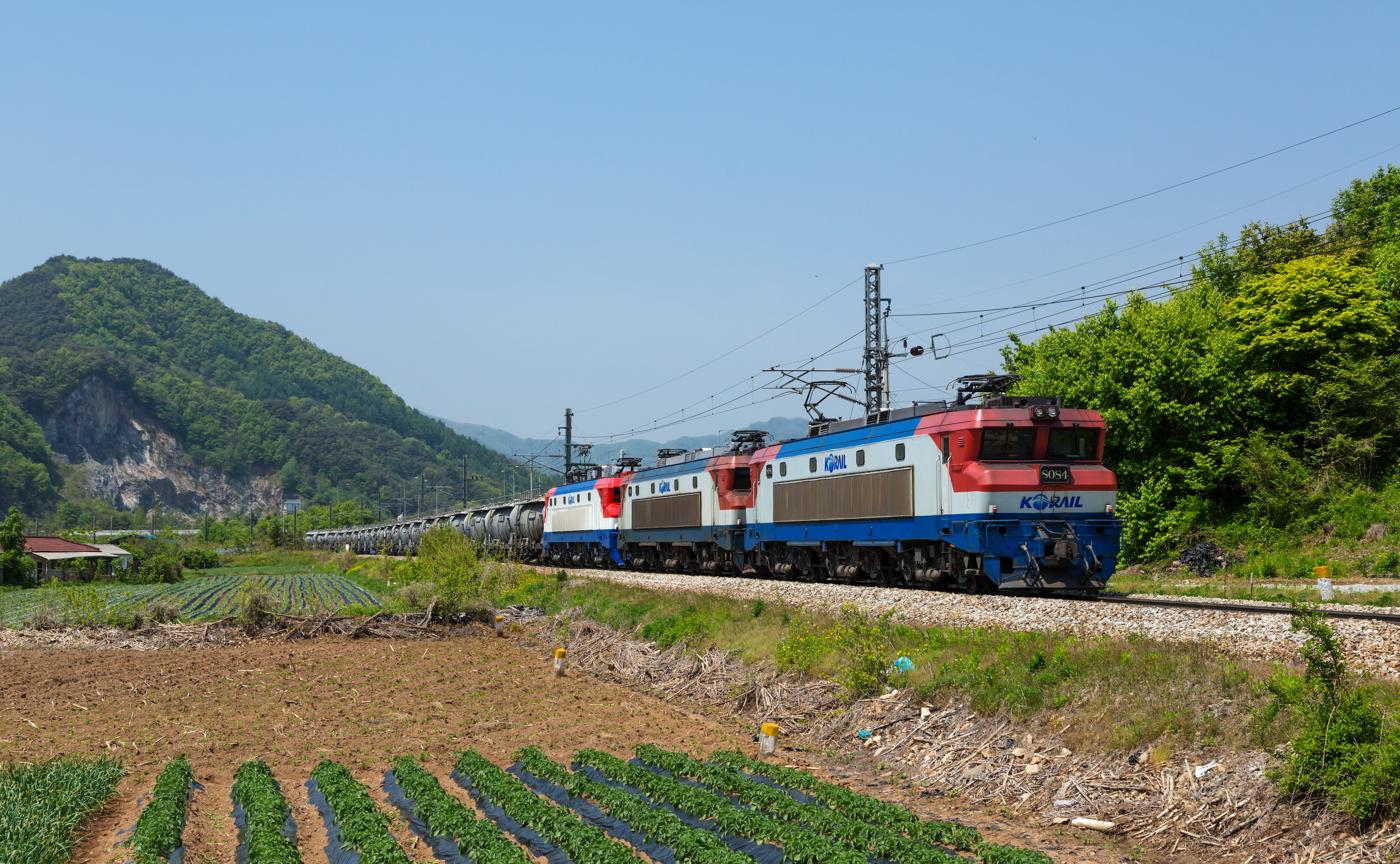
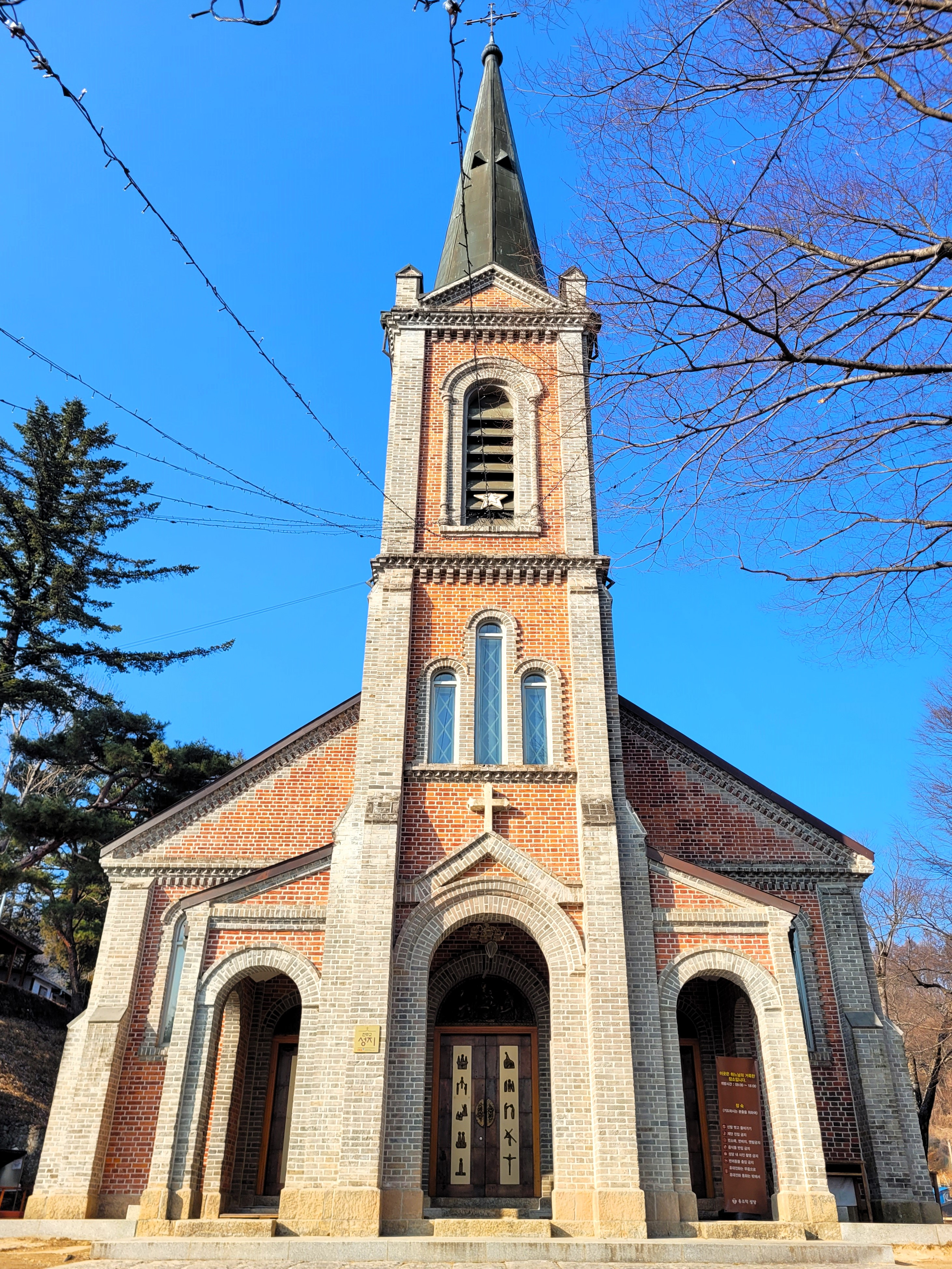
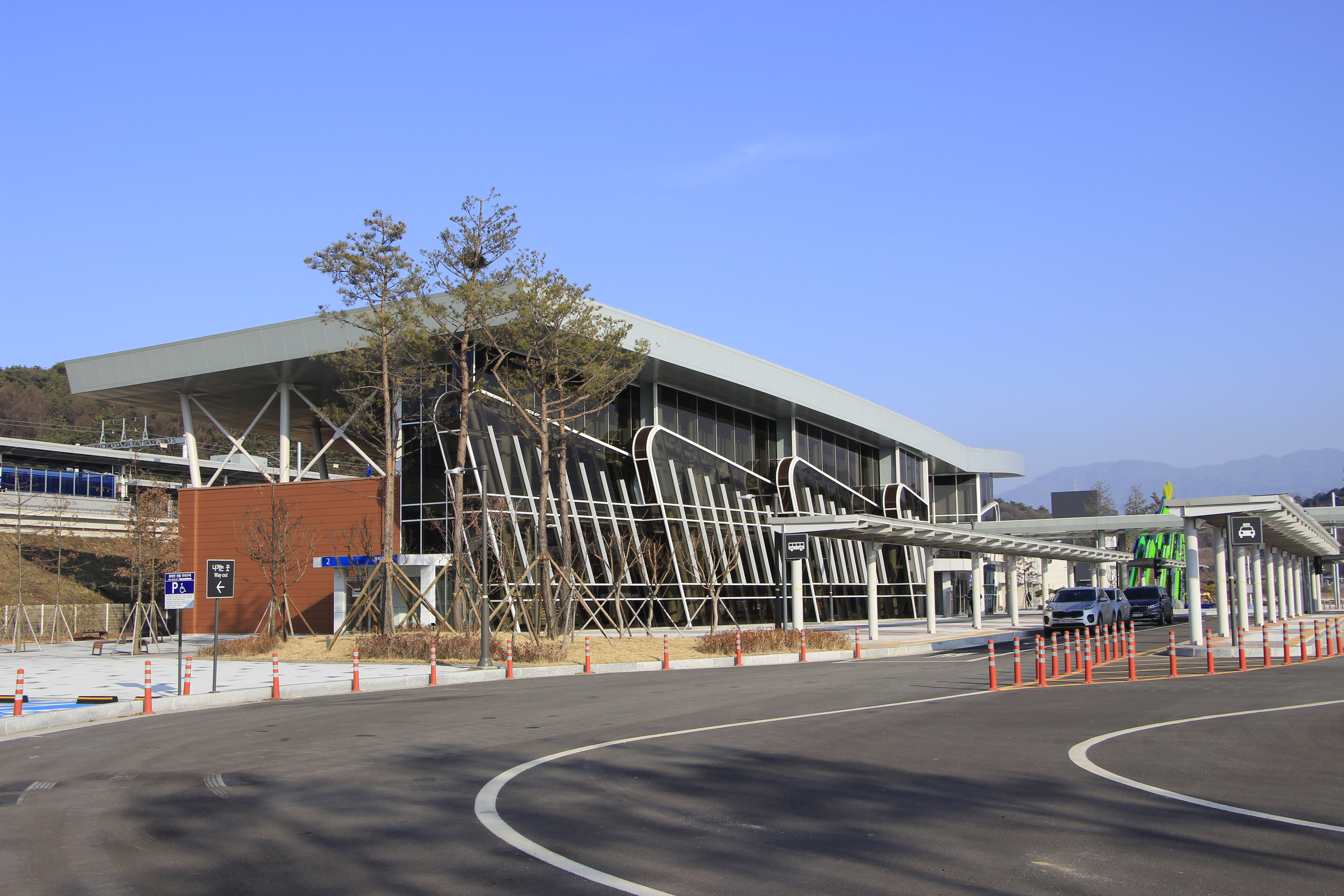
- From the left: Gangwon Gamyeong, Wonju City Hall, Korail Class 8000, Yongsomak Catholic Church, Wonju station

- Flag Logo

- Location in South Korea
- Coordinates: 37°20′30″N 127°55′15″E
- Country: South Korea
- State: Gangwon
- Administrative divisions: 1 eup, 8 myeon, 16 dong

Government
  - Mayor: Goo Ja-yeol (구자열)

Area
  - Total: 867.30 km^{2} (334.87 sq mi)

Population (September 2024)
  - Total: 362,017
  - Density: 421/km^{2} (1,090/sq mi)
  - Dialect: Gangwon
- Area code: +82-33-7xx
- ISO 3166 code: KR-42

Korean name
- Hangul: 원주시
- Hanja: 原州市
- RR: Wonju-si
- MR: Wŏnju-si

Wonju (Note: In the 19th century, Wonju was spelled Wen-tsiou.) (Korean: 원주; Korean pronunciation: [wʌn.dʑu]) is the most populous city in the state of Gangwon, South Korea, with a population of 364,860 as of 2023. The city is located approximately 140 kilometres (87 mi) east of Seoul.

== History ==
During the time of Great Joseon, Wonju was the capital of the historic Gangwon Province, one of the Eight Provinces of Korea.

=== Korean War ===
Wonju was the site of the first ever massacres conducted by the Republic of Korea Army against suspected communists that occurred on 30 June 1950. On 2 July of the same year, the Korean People's Army attacked Wonju before capturing it on 7 July.

Throughout the Korean War, Wonju was the site of three crucial battles.

== Geography ==
Wonju sits at the southwestern corner of Gangwon Province, bordering Gyeonggi Province to the west and North Chungcheong Province to the south. Within Gangwon, Wonju borders Yeongwol County to the east and Hoengseong County to the north. Unlike much of Gangwon Province, Wonju is not a mountainous area, but rather a basin along the wide plain created by the Seom River.

== Administrative divisions ==
Wonju is divided into 1 eup (town), 8 myeon (townships), and 16 dong (neighborhoods).

Name	Hangul	Hanja	Population	Area (km^{2})
Munmak-eup	문막읍	文幕邑	17,659	104.34
Socho-myeon	소초면	所草面	8,468	103.08
Hojeo-myeon	호저면	好楮面	3,687	76.97
Jijeong-myeon	지정면	地正面	28,438	89.70
Buron-myeon	부론면	富論面	2,261	82.67
Gwirea-myeon	귀래면	貴來面	2,177	76.55
Heungeop-myeon	흥업면	興業面	8,627	59.59
Panbu-myeon	판부면	板富面	7,269	67.72
Sillim-myeon	신림면	神林面	3,538	127.41
Jungang-dong	중앙동	中央洞	2,663	1.90
Wonin-dong	원인동	園仁洞	5,059	0.48
Gaeun-dong	개운동	開運洞	12,738	1.05
Myeongnyun il-dong	명륜1동	明倫1洞	8,525	0.92
Myeongnyun i-dong	명륜2동	明倫2洞	15,515	0.94
Dangu-dong	단구동	丹邱洞	44,364	3.91
Ilsan-dong	일산동	一山洞	8,583	0.80
Hakseong-dong	학성동	鶴城洞	4,713	0.73
Dangye-dong	단계동	丹溪洞	28,990	4.16
Usan-dong	우산동	牛山洞	13,507	7.40
Taejang il-dong	태장1동	台壯1洞	10,067	3.04
Taejang i-dong	태장2동	台壯2洞	24,736	8.94
Bongsan-dong	봉산동	鳳山洞	8,059	7.26
Haenggu-dong	행구동	杏邱洞	7,786	13.44
Musil-dong	무실동	茂實洞	32,906	8.59
BangokGwanseol-dong	반곡관설동	盤谷觀雪洞	44,433	21.00
Total			354,768	872.56

== Transportation ==
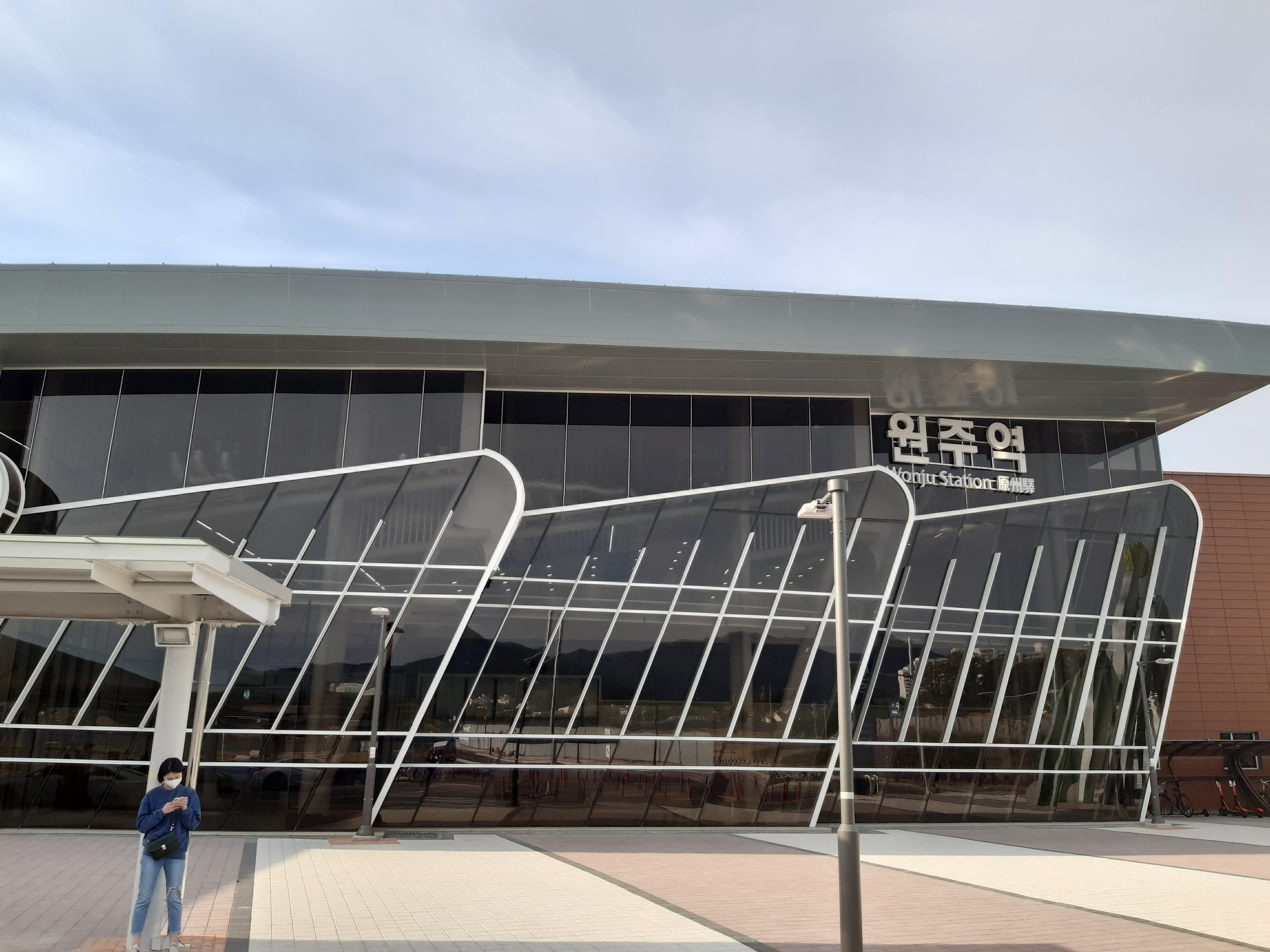
Jungang line Wonju station

- Wonju Bus Terminal
- Wonju Express Bus Terminal
- Manjong station
- Wonju station
- Seowonju station
- Wonju Airport

== Education ==
- Gangneung-Wonju National University
- Halla University
- Sangji University
- Yonsei University (Mirae Campus)
- Kyungdong University

There is one international school: Wonju Chinese Primary School (traditional Chinese: 原州華僑小學校; ; Korean: 원주화교소학교).

According to data released by Wonju City Hall in 2015, the number of kindergartens located in Wonju was 71.

There are 48 elementary and 22 middle schools.

In the case of high schools, there are 15 general high schools, 2 special purpose high schools, and 3 specialized high schools, a total of 20.

== Culture ==
A Rail Park has been built on the disused rail tracks connecting the stations of Pandae and Ganhyeon, for a total of 6.5 km (4.0 mi). The total ride journey is about 40 minutes, offering scenic views of the surrounding mountains while cycling.

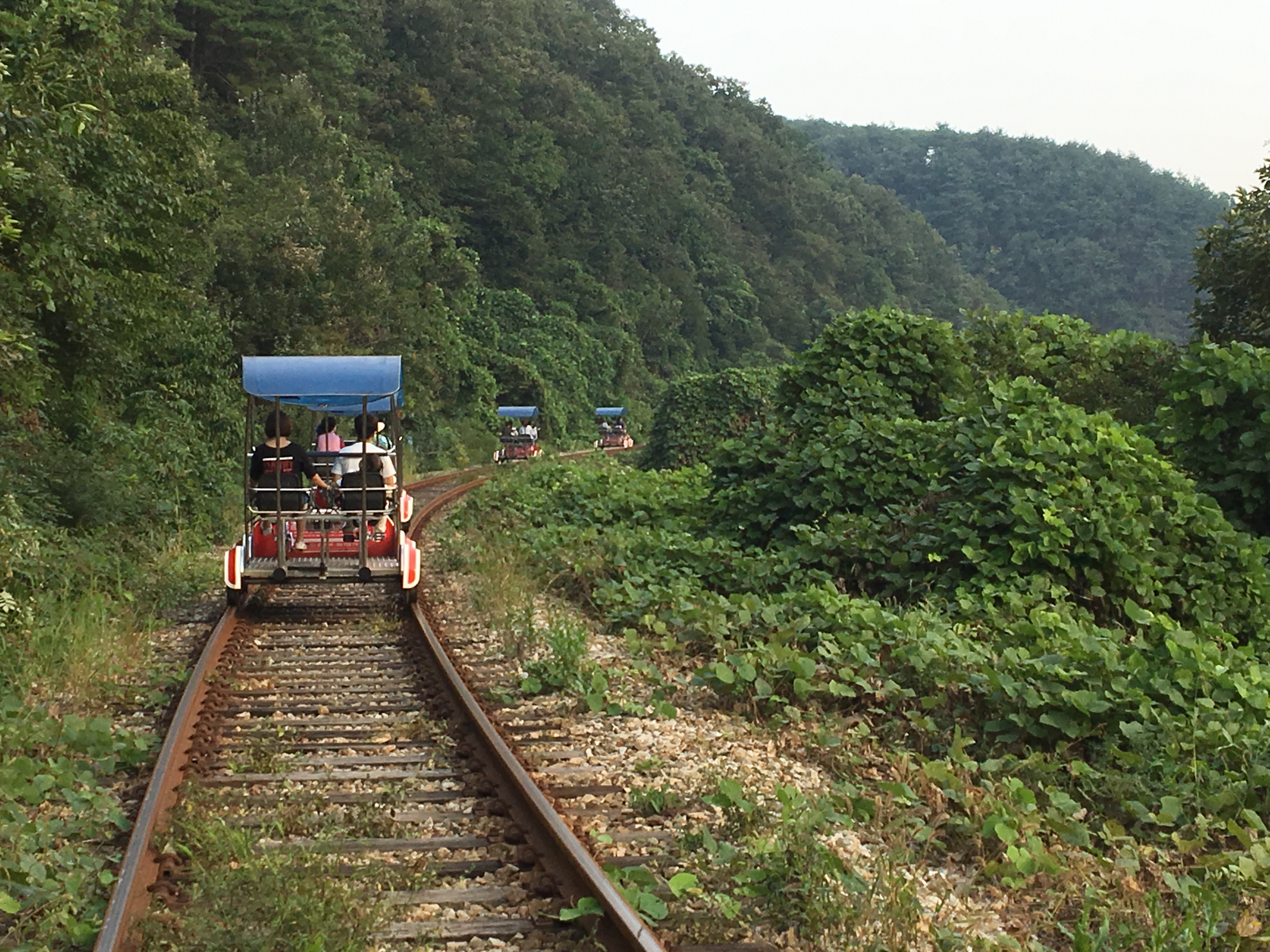
Section of the Wonju Rail Park

The Roman Catholic Diocese of Wonju is based in Wonju.

=== Museums ===
- Mureung Museum
- Yonsei University Wonju Museum
- Museum yetchaek towns
- Wonju City Museum
- Chiak Folk Museum
- Myeongjusa Chiaksan and Engraving Museum
- Toji Literature park
- Toji Cultural Center
- Hanji museum
- On Museum of the Arts
- Museum San

=== Libraries ===
- Wonju City Library
- Taejang Library
- Jungcheon Philosophical Library
- Wonju Education and Culture Center
- Munmak Library

== Climate ==
The climate of Wonju is a hot-Summer, monsoon-influenced Humid continental climate (Köppen: Dwa, Trewartha: Dcao).

Climate data for Wonju (1991–2020 normals, extremes 1971–present)
Month	Jan	Feb	Mar	Apr	May	Jun	Jul	Aug	Sep	Oct	Nov	Dec	Year
Record high °C (°F)	13.9 (57.0)	21.1 (70.0)	25.3 (77.5)	33.2 (91.8)	34.1 (93.4)	35.3 (95.5)	38.0 (100.4)	38.8 (101.8)	34.2 (93.6)	29.3 (84.7)	25.5 (77.9)	17.2 (63.0)	38.8 (101.8)
Mean daily maximum °C (°F)	2.4 (36.3)	5.6 (42.1)	11.8 (53.2)	19.1 (66.4)	24.4 (75.9)	28.1 (82.6)	29.7 (85.5)	30.3 (86.5)	25.9 (78.6)	20.0 (68.0)	12.0 (53.6)	4.3 (39.7)	17.8 (64.0)
Daily mean °C (°F)	−3.1 (26.4)	−0.3 (31.5)	5.5 (41.9)	12.2 (54.0)	17.9 (64.2)	22.4 (72.3)	25.1 (77.2)	25.3 (77.5)	20.2 (68.4)	13.3 (55.9)	6.0 (42.8)	−1.1 (30.0)	12.0 (53.6)
Mean daily minimum °C (°F)	−8.0 (17.6)	−5.6 (21.9)	−0.3 (31.5)	5.7 (42.3)	11.8 (53.2)	17.3 (63.1)	21.4 (70.5)	21.5 (70.7)	15.5 (59.9)	7.8 (46.0)	1.0 (33.8)	−5.7 (21.7)	6.9 (44.4)
Record low °C (°F)	−27.6 (−17.7)	−23.7 (−10.7)	−13.8 (7.2)	−6.7 (19.9)	0.9 (33.6)	5.5 (41.9)	11.5 (52.7)	9.8 (49.6)	2.0 (35.6)	−6.9 (19.6)	−15.1 (4.8)	−26.8 (−16.2)	−27.6 (−17.7)
Average precipitation mm (inches)	18.0 (0.71)	28.5 (1.12)	43.8 (1.72)	73.0 (2.87)	86.1 (3.39)	136.7 (5.38)	357.8 (14.09)	289.8 (11.41)	147.0 (5.79)	52.7 (2.07)	42.1 (1.66)	23.5 (0.93)	1,299 (51.14)
Average precipitation days (≥ 0.1 mm)	6.7	6.2	8.1	8.9	8.9	10.1	16.6	14.9	9.2	6.0	8.5	7.6	111.7
Average snowy days	8.2	6.6	3.9	0.2	0.0	0.0	0.0	0.0	0.0	0.1	2.0	6.2	27.1
Average relative humidity (%)	64.0	60.5	57.9	56.4	61.3	67.1	76.3	75.8	73.3	71.1	68.6	66.8	66.6
Mean monthly sunshine hours	162.5	164.5	189.5	199.7	217.2	186.2	132.4	153.7	166.2	188.4	148.7	154.2	2,063.2
Percentage possible sunshine	52.8	54.1	51.1	54.0	50.3	44.1	32.8	40.2	46.8	53.6	48.7	51.2	47.7
Source: Korea Meteorological Administration (snow and percent sunshine 1981–2010)

== Sports ==
Wonju is home city of the Wonju DB Promy, playing in the Korean Basketball League. Their home arena is Wonju Gymnasium, which is located in Myeongnyun il-dong, Wonju. The team has won the Championship three times (2002–03, 2004–05, and 2007–08).

== Sister cities ==
- Roanoke, Virginia, United States
- Edmonton, Alberta, Canada
- Yantai, Shandong, China
- Hefei, Anhui, China
- Ichikawa, Chiba, Japan
- Belfast, Northern Ireland

== Notable people from Wonju ==
- Kim Seon-dong (김선동), South Korean politician and Secretary-General of the United Future Party (UFP)
- Jee Yong-ju (지용주), South Korean amateur boxer
- Kim Jae-woong (김재웅), South Korean football midfielder
- Kim Ji-woong (김지웅), South Korean actor and singer
- Jang Mi-ran (장미란), South Korean weightlifter
- Yoon Jin-hee (윤진희), South Korean weightlifter
- Heechul (Real Name: Kim Hee-chul, 김희철), singer-songwriter, dancer, model, actor, speaker, MC and K-pop idol, member of K-pop boy group Super Junior, member of the project groups Universe Cowards
- Kim Do-yeon (김도연), actress and former member of disbanded K-pop girl group project I.O.I, K-pop girl group Weki Meki's lead vocalist and visual
- Yoon Ji-sung, South Korean singer and actor, former member of disbanded K-pop boy group project Wanna One
- Sojung (Real Name: Lee So-jung, 이소정), singer, dancer, model and K-pop idol, member of K-pop girlgroup Ladies' Code
- Joo Won Ahn (안주원), South Korean ballet dancer
- Ahn Young-mi (안영미), South Korean comedian and member of K-pop girl group Celeb Five
- Choi Kyu-hah (최규하), South Korean politician and former President of South Korea
- Chai-Sik Chung (정채식), Korean-American social ethicist and sociologist of religion
- Ham Deok-ju (함덕주), South Korean professional baseball pitcher (Doosan Bears, Korea Baseball Organization)
- Han Dong-jin (한동진), South Korean footballer (Jeju United FC, K League 2)
- Shin Yu-na (유나), member of K-pop girl group ITZY
- Park Sungho (박성호), member of K-pop boy group BoyNextDoor
