= Australian soccer clubs in continental competitions =

Records of the Australian A-League Men clubs in continental club football competitions organised by the Asian Football Confederation. The Western Sydney Wanderers and Central Coast Mariners are the only Australian sides to have won an AFC competition, having won the AFC Champions League and AFC Cup respectively. Adelaide United are the only other Australian side to have made a final. Melbourne Victory have the most tournament appearances in the AFC Champions League of any Australian club, with 9 appearances, and the most matches played of any Australian club, with 54 matches played.

Australia is the only nation in the AFC to have had clubs win both the AFC Champions League and AFC Cup.

== Overview (men) ==
=== AFC allocation ===
Since 2007, Australian clubs have participated in the AFC Champions League. There have been a different number of teams qualifying for the group stage and the play-off stage during this time. For several years, the AFC ruled that the A-League did not meet the criteria for full participation in the tournament, including the lack of promotion and relegation within a tiered league system was a major reason, and that the A-league was not run as a separate entity to the FFA.

With the new format for the competition, and based on the yearly AFC club competitions ranking, Australia has one entrant to the League stage of the AFC Champions League Elite and one entrant to the Group stage of the AFC Champions League Two.

AFC Champions League / AFC Champions League Elite
Year	Group stage	Playoff round	Preliminary round
2007	2	–	–
2008	2	–	–
2009	2	0	–
2010	2	0	–
2011	2	0	–
2012	2	1	–
2013	1	1	–
2014	2	1	0
2015	2	1	0
2016	2	1	0
2017	2	0	1
2018	2	0	1
2019	2	0	1
2020	2	0	1
2021	1	0	2
2022	1	0	2
2023–24	1	0	0
2024–25	1	0	–
2025–26	1	0	–
2026–27	1	1	–

AFC Cup / AFC Champions League Two
Year	Group stage	Playoff round	Preliminary round
2023–24	2	0	0
2024–25	1	0	–
2025–26	1	0	–
2026–27	1	0	–

=== Results ===
AFC Champions League / AFC Champions League Elite
Team	Qualified	2007	2008	2009	2010	2011	2012	2013	2014	2015	2016	2017	2018	2019	2020	2021	2022	2023–24	2024–25	2025–26	2026–27
Melbourne Victory	9	–	GS	–	GS	GS	–	–	GS	–	R16	–	GS	GS	R16	–	PO	–	–	–	–
Sydney FC	8	GS	–	–	–	GS	–	–	–	–	R16	–	GS	GS	GS	W	GS	–	–	–	–
Adelaide United	7	GS	RU	–	R16	–	QF	–	–	–	PO	GS	–	–	–	–	–	–	–	–	PO
Brisbane Roar	6	–	–	–	–	–	GS	PO	–	GS	–	GS	PR2	–	–	W	–	–	–	–	–
Central Coast Mariners	6	–	–	GS	–	–	GS	R16	GS	PO	–	–	–	–	–	–	–	–	LS	–	–
Western Sydney Wanderers	3	–	–	–	–	–	–	–	C	GS	–	GS	–	–	–	–	–	–	–	–	–
Melbourne City	4	–	–	–	–	–	–	–	–	–	–	–	–	–	–	W	GS	GS	–	R16	–
Newcastle Jets	3	–	–	R16	–	–	–	–	–	–	–	–	–	PO	–	–	–	–	–	–	LS
Perth Glory	1	–	–	–	–	–	–	–	–	–	–	–	–	–	GS	–	–	–	–	–	–

AFC Cup / AFC Champions League Two
Team	Qualified	2023–24	2024–25	2025–26	2026–27
Macarthur FC	2	ZF	–	R16	–
Central Coast Mariners	1	C	–	–	–
Sydney FC	1	–	SF	–	–
Adelaide United	1	–	–	–	GS
Melbourne Victory	1	–	–	–	GS

Legend

- Q : Qualified
- W : Withdrew
- PR2 : Preliminary round 2
- PO : Qualifying play-off round
- GS : Group stage
- LS : League stage
- ZSF: Zonal semi-finals (AFC Cup)
- ZF: Zonal finals (AFC Cup)
- IZSF: Inter-zone play-off semi-finals (AFC Cup)
- IZF: Inter-zone play-off finals (AFC Cup)
- R16 : Round of 16
- QF : Quarter-finals
- SF : Semi-finals
- RU : Runners-Up
- C : Champions

=== Statistics by club ===
#	Team	Pld	W	D	L	GF	GA	GD	Pts	Best Result CL and CL Elite	Best Result AFC Cup and CL2
1	Adelaide United	47	20	10	17	62	54	+8	70	Runners-up (ACL)	Group stage (ACL2)
2	Sydney FC	57	17	19	21	77	75	+2	70	Round of 16 (ACL)	Semifinals (ACL2)
3	Melbourne Victory	58	16	15	27	75	106	−31	64	Round of 16 (ACL)	Group stage (ACL2)
4	Central Coast Mariners	48	14	10	24	69	79	−10	52	Round of 16 (ACL)	Champions (AC)
5	Western Sydney Wanderers	26	12	4	10	38	39	−1	40	Champions (ACL)	
6	Melbourne City	22	9	10	3	28	17	+11	37	Group stage (ACL)	
7	Macarthur FC	16	10	2	4	41	18	+23	32		Zonal finals (AC)
8	Brisbane Roar	22	5	6	11	27	39	−11	21	Group stage (ACL)	
9	Newcastle Jets	13	4	1	8	16	35	−19	13	Round of 16 (ACL)	
10	Perth Glory	6	0	1	5	5	11	−6	1	Group stage (ACL)	

=== Statistics by season ===
Season	Pld	W	D	L	GF	GA	GD	Pts
2007	12	4	5	3	17	11	+6	17
2008	18	8	4	6	24	20	+4	28
2009	13	3	3	7	11	24	−13	12
2010	13	4	2	7	11	17	−6	14
2011	12	2	5	5	13	22	−9	11
2012	22	7	8	7	28	29	−1	29
2013	9	2	2	5	6	14	−8	8
2014	27	13	6	8	34	27	+7	45
2015	13	4	3	6	17	19	−2	15
2016	17	5	7	5	17	19	−2	22
2017	20	6	3	11	32	51	−19	21
2018	13	3	5	5	20	27	−7	14
2019	14	1	4	9	13	33	−20	7
2020	21	5	4	12	25	33	−8	19
2022	14	4	5	5	21	16	+5	17
2023–24 (ACL, AC)	27	17	6	4	73	24	+49	57
2024–25 (ACLE, ACL2)	20	8	2	10	37	35	+2	26
2025–26 (ACLE, ACL2)	18	8	6	4	23	18	+5	30
2026–27 (ACLE, ACL2)	13	3	1	9	16	34	−18	10
Total	316	107	81	128	438	473	–35	402

== Games by club (men) ==
Win Draw Loss Cancelled

=== Adelaide United ===
Adelaide United results
Season	Round	Result	Opponent	Venue
2007 AFC Champions League	Group stage	0–1	(China) Shandong Luneng Taishan	Adelaide, Australia
2007 AFC Champions League	Group stage	2–0	(Vietnam) Gach Dong Tam Long An	Tân An, Vietnam
2007 AFC Champions League	Group stage	2–2	(South Korea) Seongnam Ilhwa Chunma	Adelaide, Australia
2007 AFC Champions League	Group stage	0–1	(South Korea) Seongnam Ilhwa Chunma	Seongnam, South Korea
2007 AFC Champions League	Group stage	2–2	(China) Shandong Luneng Taishan	Jinan, China
2007 AFC Champions League	Group stage	3–0	(Vietnam) Gach Dong Tam Long An	Adelaide, Australia
2008 AFC Champions League	Group stage	2–0	(South Korea) Pohang Steelers	Pohang, South Korea
2008 AFC Champions League	Group stage	0–0	(China) Changchun Yatai	Adelaide, Australia
2008 AFC Champions League	Group stage	2–1	(Vietnam) Bình Dương F.C.	Thu Dao Mot, Vietnam
2008 AFC Champions League	Group stage	4–1	(Vietnam) Bình Dương F.C.	Adelaide, Australia
2008 AFC Champions League	Group stage	1–0	(South Korea) Pohang Steelers	Adelaide, Australia
2008 AFC Champions League	Group stage	0–0	(China) Changchun Yatai	Changchun, China
2008 AFC Champions League	Quarter-final	1–1	(Japan) Kashima Antlers	Kashima, Japan
2008 AFC Champions League	Quarter-final	1–0	(Japan) Kashima Antlers	Adelaide, Australia
2008 AFC Champions League	Semi-final	3–0	(Uzbekistan) FC Bunyodkor	Adelaide, Australia
2008 AFC Champions League	Semi-final	0–1	(Uzbekistan) FC Bunyodkor	Tashkent, Uzbekistan
2008 AFC Champions League	Final	0–3	(Japan) Gamba Osaka	Osaka, Japan
2008 AFC Champions League	Final	0–2	(Japan) Gamba Osaka	Adelaide, Australia
2010 AFC Champions League	Group stage	1–0	(South Korea) Pohang Steelers	Adelaide, Australia
2010 AFC Champions League	Group stage	2–0	(China) Shandong Luneng Taishan	Jinan, China
2010 AFC Champions League	Group stage	3–2	(Japan) Sanfrecce Hiroshima	Adelaide, Australia
2010 AFC Champions League	Group stage	0–1	(Japan) Sanfrecce Hiroshima	Hiroshima, Japan
2010 AFC Champions League	Group stage	0–0	(South Korea) Pohang Steelers	Pohang, South Korea
2010 AFC Champions League	Group stage	0–1	(China) Shandong Luneng Taishan	Adelaide, Australia
2010 AFC Champions League	Round of 16	2–3	(South Korea) Jeonbuk Hyundai Motors	Adelaide, Australia
2012 AFC Champions League	Qualifying play-off	3–0	(Indonesia) Persipura Jayapura	Adelaide, Australia
2012 AFC Champions League	Group stage	2–1	(Uzbekistan) FC Bunyodkor	Tashkent, Uzbekistan
2012 AFC Champions League	Group stage	2–0	(Japan) Gamba Osaka	Adelaide, Australia
2012 AFC Champions League	Group stage	0–1	(South Korea) Pohang Steelers	Pohang, South Korea
2012 AFC Champions League	Group stage	1–0	(South Korea) Pohang Steelers	Adelaide, Australia
2012 AFC Champions League	Group stage	0–0	(Uzbekistan) FC Bunyodkor	Adelaide, Australia
2012 AFC Champions League	Group stage	2–0	(Japan) Gamba Osaka	Osaka, Japan
2012 AFC Champions League	Round of 16	1–0	(Japan) Nagoya Grampus	Adelaide, Australia
2012 AFC Champions League	Quarter-final	2–2	(Uzbekistan) FC Bunyodkor	Adelaide, Australia
2012 AFC Champions League	Quarter-final	2–3 (a.e.t.)	(Uzbekistan) FC Bunyodkor	Tashkent, Uzbekistan
2016 AFC Champions League	Qualifying play-off	1–2	(China) Shandong Luneng Taishan	Adelaide, Australia
2017 AFC Champions League	Group stage	0–3	(Japan) Gamba Osaka	Adelaide, Australia
2017 AFC Champions League	Group stage	1–2	(China) Jiangsu Suning	Nanjing, China
2017 AFC Champions League	Group stage	3–3	(South Korea) Jeju United	Adelaide, Australia
2017 AFC Champions League	Group stage	3–1	(South Korea) Jeju United	Seogwipo, South Korea
2017 AFC Champions League	Group stage	3–3	(Japan) Gamba Osaka	Suita, Japan
2017 AFC Champions League	Group stage	0–1	(China) Jiangsu Suning	Adelaide, Australia
2026–27 AFC Champions League Elite	Qualifying play-off	0–2	(Vietnam) Công An Hà Nội	Adelaide, Australia
2026–27 AFC Champions League Two	Group stage	3–0	(Hong Kong) Tai Po	Adelaide, Australia
2026–27 AFC Champions League Two	Group stage	2–1	(Thailand) BG Pathum United	Pathum Thani, Thailand
2026–27 AFC Champions League Two	Group stage	0–2	(Singapore) Lion City Sailors	Adelaide, Australia
2026–27 AFC Champions League Two	Group stage	0–5	(Singapore) Lion City Sailors	Kallang, Singapore
2026–27 AFC Champions League Two	Group stage		(Hong Kong) Tai Po	Mong Kok, Hong Kong
2026–27 AFC Champions League Two	Group stage		(Thailand) BG Pathum United	Adelaide, Australia

=== Brisbane Roar ===
Brisbane Roar results
Season	Round	Result	Opponent	Venue
2012 AFC Champions League	Group stage	0–2	(Japan) FC Tokyo	Brisbane, Australia
2012 AFC Champions League	Group stage	1–1	(China) Beijing Guoan	Beijing, China
2012 AFC Champions League	Group stage	1–1	(South Korea) Ulsan Hyundai	Ulsan, South Korea
2012 AFC Champions League	Group stage	1–2	(South Korea) Ulsan Hyundai	Brisbane, Australia
2012 AFC Champions League	Group stage	2–4	(Japan) FC Tokyo	Tokyo, Japan
2012 AFC Champions League	Group stage	1–1	(China) Beijing Guoan	Brisbane, Australia
2013 AFC Champions League	Qualifying play-off	0–0 (a.e.t.) (0–3 (p))	(Thailand) Buriram United	Buriram, Thailand
2015 AFC Champions League	Group stage	0–1	(China) Beijing Guoan	Gold Coast, Australia
2015 AFC Champions League	Group stage	1–0	(Japan) Urawa Red Diamonds	Saitama, Japan
2015 AFC Champions League	Group stage	3–3	(South Korea) Suwon Samsung Bluewings	Gold Coast, Australia
2015 AFC Champions League	Group stage	1–3	(South Korea) Suwon Samsung Bluewings	Suwon, South Korea
2015 AFC Champions League	Group stage	1–0	(China) Beijing Guoan	Beijing, China
2015 AFC Champions League	Group stage	1–2	(Japan) Urawa Red Diamonds	Gold Coast, Australia
2017 AFC Champions League	Preliminary round 2	6–0	(Philippines) Global	Brisbane, Australia
2017 AFC Champions League	Qualifying play-off	2–0	(China) Shanghai Shenhua	Shanghai, China
2017 AFC Champions League	Group stage	0–0	(Thailand) Muangthong United	Brisbane, Australia
2017 AFC Champions League	Group stage	0–6	(South Korea) Ulsan Hyundai	Ulsan, South Korea
2017 AFC Champions League	Group stage	0–3	(Japan) Kashima Antlers	Kashima, Japan
2017 AFC Champions League	Group stage	2–1	(Japan) Kashima Antlers	Brisbane, Australia
2017 AFC Champions League	Group stage	0–3	(Thailand) Muangthong United	Pak Kret, Thailand
2017 AFC Champions League	Group stage	2–3	(South Korea) Ulsan Hyundai	Brisbane, Australia
2018 AFC Champions League	Preliminary round 2	2–3	(Philippines) Ceres–Negros	Brisbane, Australia

=== Central Coast Mariners ===
Central Coast Mariners results
Season	Round	Result	Opponent	Venue
2009 AFC Champions League	Group stage	0–0	(South Korea) Pohang Steelers	Gosford, Australia
2009 AFC Champions League	Group stage	2–2	(China) Tianjin Teda FC	Tianjin, China
2009 AFC Champions League	Group stage	0–5	(Japan) Kawasaki Frontale	Gosford, Australia
2009 AFC Champions League	Group stage	1–2	(Japan) Kawasaki Frontale	Kawasaki, Japan
2009 AFC Champions League	Group stage	2–3	(South Korea) Pohang Steelers	Pohang, South Korea
2009 AFC Champions League	Group stage	0–1	(China) Tianjin Teda FC	Gosford, Australia
2012 AFC Champions League	Group stage	0–0	(China) Tianjin Teda FC	Tianjin, China
2012 AFC Champions League	Group stage	1–1	(Japan) Nagoya Grampus	Gosford, Australia
2012 AFC Champions League	Group stage	1–1	(South Korea) Seongnam Ilhwa Chunma	Gosford, Australia
2012 AFC Champions League	Group stage	0–5	(South Korea) Seongnam Ilhwa Chunma	Seongnam, South Korea
2012 AFC Champions League	Group stage	5–1	(China) Tianjin Teda FC	Gosford, Australia
2012 AFC Champions League	Group stage	0–3	(Japan) Nagoya Grampus	Nagoya, Japan
2013 AFC Champions League	Group stage	0–0	(South Korea) Suwon Bluewings	Gosford, Australia
2013 AFC Champions League	Group stage	1–3	(Japan) Kashiwa Reysol	Kashiwa, Japan
2013 AFC Champions League	Group stage	2–1	(China) Guizhou Renhe	Gosford, Australia
2013 AFC Champions League	Group stage	1–2	(China) Guizhou Renhe	Guiyang, China
2013 AFC Champions League	Group stage	1–0	(South Korea) Suwon Bluewings	Suwon, South Korea
2013 AFC Champions League	Group stage	0–3	(Japan) Kashiwa Reysol	Gosford, Australia
2013 AFC Champions League	Round of 16	1–2	(China) Guangzhou Evergrande	Gosford, Australia
2013 AFC Champions League	Round of 16	0–3	(China) Guangzhou Evergrande	Guangzhou, China
2014 AFC Champions League	Group stage	0–2	(South Korea) FC Seoul	Seoul, South Korea
2014 AFC Champions League	Group stage	2–1	(Japan) Sanfrecce Hiroshima	Gosford, Australia
2014 AFC Champions League	Group stage	1–2	(China) Beijing Guoan	Beijing, China
2014 AFC Champions League	Group stage	1–0	(China) Beijing Guoan	Gosford, Australia
2014 AFC Champions League	Group stage	0–1	(South Korea) FC Seoul	Gosford, Australia
2014 AFC Champions League	Group stage	0–1	(Japan) Sanfrecce Hiroshima	Hiroshima, Japan
2015 AFC Champions League	Qualifying play-off	1–3	(China) Guangzhou R&F	Gosford, Australia
2023–24 AFC Cup	Group stage	0–1	(Malaysia) Terengganu	Kuala Terengganu, Malaysia
2023–24 AFC Cup	Group stage	9–1	(Philippines) Stallion Laguna	Gosford, Australia
2023–24 AFC Cup	Group stage	6–3	(Indonesia) Bali United	Gosford, Australia
2023–24 AFC Cup	Group stage	2–1	(Indonesia) Bali United	Gianyar, Indonesia
2023–24 AFC Cup	Group stage	1–1	(Malaysia) Terengganu	Gosford, Australia
2023–24 AFC Cup	Group stage	3–0	(Philippines) Stallion Laguna	Biñan, Philippines
2023–24 AFC Cup	Zonal semi-finals	4–0	(Cambodia) Phnom Penh Crown	Gosford, Australia
2023–24 AFC Cup	Zonal final	3–2	(Australia) Macarthur FC	Sydney, Australia
2023–24 AFC Cup	Inter-zone play-off semi-finals	4–0	(India) Odisha	Gosford, Australia
2023–24 AFC Cup	Inter-zone play-off semi-finals	0–0	(India) Odisha	Bhubaneswar, India
2023–24 AFC Cup	Inter-zone play-off final	1–1	(Kyrgyzstan) Abdysh-Ata Kant	Bishkek, Kyrgyzstan
2023–24 AFC Cup	Inter-zone play-off final	3–0	(Kyrgyzstan) Abdysh-Ata Kant	Gosford, Australia
2023–24 AFC Cup	Final	1–0	(Lebanon) Al Ahed	Muscat, Oman
2024–25 AFC Champions League Elite	League stage	~~1–3~~	(China) ~~Shandong Taishan~~ (Note: Shandong Taishan were considered withdrawn from the 2024–25 AFC Champions League Elite after the club confirmed that it did not intend to report for their last league stage match against Ulsan HD on 19 February 2025.)	Jinan, China
2024–25 AFC Champions League Elite	League stage	1–2	(Thailand) Buriram United	Gosford, Australia
2024–25 AFC Champions League Elite	League stage	2–3	(China) Shanghai Port	Shanghai, China
2024–25 AFC Champions League Elite	League stage	2–2	(China) Shanghai Shenhua	Gosford, Australia
2024–25 AFC Champions League Elite	League stage	2–3	(Japan) Vissel Kobe	Kobe, Japan
2024–25 AFC Champions League Elite	League stage	0–4	(Japan) Yokohama F. Marinos	Gosford, Australia
2024–25 AFC Champions League Elite	League stage	1–2	(Malaysia) Johor Darul Ta'zim	Gosford, Australia
2024–25 AFC Champions League Elite	League stage	0–2	(Japan) Kawasaki Frontale	Kawasaki, Japan

=== Macarthur FC ===
Macarthur FC results
Season	Round	Result	Opponent	Venue
2023–24 AFC Cup	Group stage	3–0	(Myanmar) Shan United	Yangon, Myanmar
2023–24 AFC Cup	Group stage	8–2	(Philippines) DH Cebu	Sydney, Australia
2023–24 AFC Cup	Group stage	0–3	(Cambodia) Phnom Penh Crown	Phnom Penh, Cambodia
2023–24 AFC Cup	Group stage	5–0	(Cambodia) Phnom Penh Crown	Sydney, Australia
2023–24 AFC Cup	Group stage	4–0	(Myanmar) Shan United	Pathum Thani, Thailand
2023–24 AFC Cup	Group stage	3–0	(Philippines) DH Cebu	Manila, Philippines
2023–24 AFC Cup	Zonal semi-finals	3–0	(Malaysia) Sabah	Sydney, Australia
2023–24 AFC Cup	Zonal final	2–3	(Australia) Central Coast Mariners	Sydney, Australia
2025–26 AFC Champions League Two	Group stage	1–2	(Hong Kong) Tai Po	Hong Kong
2025–26 AFC Champions League Two	Group stage	3–0	(China) Beijing Guoan	Sydney, Australia
2025–26 AFC Champions League Two	Group stage	1–1	(Vietnam) Công An Hà Nội	Hanoi, Vietnam
2025–26 AFC Champions League Two	Group stage	2–1	(Vietnam) Công An Hà Nội	Sydney, Australia
2025–26 AFC Champions League Two	Group stage	2–1	(Hong Kong) Tai Po	Sydney, Australia
2025–26 AFC Champions League Two	Group stage	2–1	(China) Beijing Guoan	Beijing, China
2025–26 AFC Champions League Two	Round of 16	0–2	(Thailand) Bangkok United	Pathum Thani, Thailand
2025–26 AFC Champions League Two	Round of 16	2–2	(Thailand) Bangkok United	Sydney, Australia

=== Melbourne City ===
Melbourne City results
Season	Round	Result	Opponent	Venue
2022 AFC Champions League	Group stage	1–1	(Thailand) BG Pathum United	Pathum Thani, Thailand
2022 AFC Champions League	Group stage	3–0	(Philippines) United City	Pathum Thani, Thailand
2022 AFC Champions League	Group stage	2–1	(South Korea) Jeonnam Dragons	Pathum Thani, Thailand
2022 AFC Champions League	Group stage	1–1	(South Korea) Jeonnam Dragons	Pathum Thani, Thailand
2022 AFC Champions League	Group stage	0–0	(Thailand) BG Pathum United	Pathum Thani, Thailand
2022 AFC Champions League	Group stage	3–0	(Philippines) United City	Pathum Thani, Thailand
2023–24 AFC Champions League	Group stage	0–0	(Japan) Ventforet Kofu	Melbourne, Australia
2023–24 AFC Champions League	Group stage	2–1	(China) Zhejiang	Hangzhou, China
2023–24 AFC Champions League	Group stage	2–0	(Thailand) Buriram United	Buriram, Thailand
2023–24 AFC Champions League	Group stage	0–1	(Thailand) Buriram United	Melbourne, Australia
2023–24 AFC Champions League	Group stage	3–3	(Japan) Ventforet Kofu	Tokyo, Japan
2023–24 AFC Champions League	Group stage	1–1	(China) Zhejiang	Melbourne, Australia
2025–26 AFC Champions League Elite	League stage	0–2	(Japan) Sanfrecce Hiroshima	Melbourne, Australia
2025–26 AFC Champions League Elite	League stage	0–1	(Japan) Vissel Kobe	Kobe, Japan
2025–26 AFC Champions League Elite	League stage	2–1	(Thailand) Buriram United	Melbourne, Australia
2025–26 AFC Champions League Elite	League stage	2–1	(Japan) Machida Zelvia	Machida, Japan
2025–26 AFC Champions League Elite	League stage	2–0	(Malaysia) Johor Darul Ta'zim	Melbourne, Australia
2025–26 AFC Champions League Elite	League stage	1–1	(South Korea) FC Seoul	Seoul, South Korea
2025–26 AFC Champions League Elite	League stage	2–1	(South Korea) Ulsan HD	Ulsan, South Korea
2025–26 AFC Champions League Elite	League stage	0–0	(South Korea) Gangwon FC	Melbourne, Australia
2025–26 AFC Champions League Elite	Round of 16	1–1	(Thailand) Buriram United	Melbourne, Australia
2025–26 AFC Champions League Elite	Round of 16	0–0	(Thailand) Buriram United	Buriram, Thailand

=== Melbourne Victory ===
Melbourne Victory results
Season	Round	Result	Opponent	Venue
2008 AFC Champions League	Group stage	2–0	(South Korea) Chunnam Dragons	Melbourne, Australia
2008 AFC Champions League	Group stage	1–3	(Thailand) Chonburi FC	Bangkok, Thailand
2008 AFC Champions League	Group stage	3–4	(Japan) Gamba Osaka	Melbourne, Australia
2008 AFC Champions League	Group stage	0–2	(Japan) Gamba Osaka	Suita, Japan
2008 AFC Champions League	Group stage	1–1	(South Korea) Chunnam Dragons	Gwangyang, South Korea
2008 AFC Champions League	Group stage	3–1	(Thailand) Chonburi FC	Melbourne, Australia
2010 AFC Champions League	Group stage	0–1	(China) Beijing Guoan	Beijing, China
2010 AFC Champions League	Group stage	0–2	(South Korea) Seongnam Ilhwa Chunma	Melbourne, Australia
2010 AFC Champions League	Group stage	0–4	(Japan) Kawasaki Frontale	Kawasaki, Japan
2010 AFC Champions League	Group stage	1–0	(Japan) Kawasaki Frontale	Melbourne, Australia
2010 AFC Champions League	Group stage	0–0	(China) Beijing Guoan	Melbourne, Australia
2010 AFC Champions League	Group stage	2–3	(South Korea) Seongnam Ilhwa Chunma	Seongnam, South Korea
2011 AFC Champions League	Group stage	1–5	(Japan) Gamba Osaka	Suita, Japan
2011 AFC Champions League	Group stage	1–2	(South Korea) Jeju United	Melbourne, Australia
2011 AFC Champions League	Group stage	1–1	(China) Tianjin Teda	Tianjin, China
2011 AFC Champions League	Group stage	2–1	(China) Tianjin Teda	Melbourne, Australia
2011 AFC Champions League	Group stage	1–1	(Japan) Gamba Osaka	Melbourne, Australia
2011 AFC Champions League	Group stage	1–1	(South Korea) Jeju United	Jeju, South Korea
2014 AFC Champions League	Qualifying play-off	2–1	(Thailand) Muangthong United	Geelong, Australia
2014 AFC Champions League	Group stage	2–4	(China) Guangzhou Evergrande	Guangzhou, China
2014 AFC Champions League	Group stage	2–2	(South Korea) Jeonbuk Hyundai Motors	Melbourne, Australia
2014 AFC Champions League	Group stage	1–0	(Japan) Yokohama F. Marinos	Melbourne, Australia
2014 AFC Champions League	Group stage	2–3	(Japan) Yokohama F. Marinos	Yokohama, Japan
2014 AFC Champions League	Group stage	2–0	(China) Guangzhou Evergrande	Melbourne, Australia
2014 AFC Champions League	Group stage	0–0	(South Korea) Jeonbuk Hyundai Motors	Jeonju, South Korea
2016 AFC Champions League	Group stage	2–1	(China) Shanghai SIPG	Melbourne, Australia
2016 AFC Champions League	Group stage	1–1	(Japan) Gamba Osaka	Suita, Japan
2016 AFC Champions League	Group stage	0–0	(South Korea) Suwon Samsung Bluewings	Melbourne, Australia
2016 AFC Champions League	Group stage	1–1	(South Korea) Suwon Samsung Bluewings	Suwon, South Korea
2016 AFC Champions League	Group stage	1–3	(China) Shanghai SIPG	Shanghai, China
2016 AFC Champions League	Group stage	2–1	(Japan) Gamba Osaka	Melbourne, Australia
2016 AFC Champions League	Round of 16	1–1	(South Korea) Jeonbuk Hyundai Motors	Melbourne, Australia
2016 AFC Champions League	Round of 16	1–2	(South Korea) Jeonbuk Hyundai Motors	Jeonju, South Korea
2018 AFC Champions League	Group stage	3–3	(South Korea) Ulsan Hyundai	Melbourne, Australia
2018 AFC Champions League	Group stage	1–4	(China) Shanghai SIPG	Shanghai, China
2018 AFC Champions League	Group stage	2–2	(Japan) Kawasaki Frontale	Kawasaki, Japan
2018 AFC Champions League	Group stage	1–0	(Japan) Kawasaki Frontale	Melbourne, Australia
2018 AFC Champions League	Group stage	2–6	(South Korea) Ulsan Hyundai	Ulsan, South Korea
2018 AFC Champions League	Group stage	2–1	(China) Shanghai SIPG	Melbourne, Australia
2019 AFC Champions League	Group stage	1–3	(South Korea) Daegu FC	Melbourne, Australia
2019 AFC Champions League	Group stage	1–2	(Japan) Sanfrecce Hiroshima	Hiroshima, Japan
2019 AFC Champions League	Group stage	0–4	(China) Guangzhou Evergrande	Guangzhou, China
2019 AFC Champions League	Group stage	1–1	(China) Guangzhou Evergrande	Melbourne, Australia
2019 AFC Champions League	Group stage	0–4	(South Korea) Daegu FC	Daegu, South Korea
2019 AFC Champions League	Group stage	1–3	(Japan) Sanfrecce Hiroshima	Melbourne, Australia
2020 AFC Champions League	Preliminary round 2	5–0	(Indonesia) Bali United	Melbourne, Australia
2020 AFC Champions League	Play-off round	1–0	(Japan) Kashima Antlers	Kashima, Japan
2020 AFC Champions League	Group stage	1–0	(Thailand) Chiangrai United	Melbourne, Australia
2020 AFC Champions League	Group stage	0–1	(South Korea) FC Seoul	Seoul, South Korea
2020 AFC Champions League	Group stage	1–3	(China) Beijing FC	Doha, Qatar
2020 AFC Champions League	Group stage	0–2	(China) Beijing FC	Doha, Qatar
2020 AFC Champions League	Group stage	2–2	(Thailand) Chiangrai United	Doha, Qatar
2020 AFC Champions League	Group stage	2–1	(South Korea) FC Seoul	Doha, Qatar
2020 AFC Champions League	Round of 16	0–3	(South Korea) Ulsan Hyundai	Doha, Qatar
2022 AFC Champions League	Play-off round	3–4	(Japan) Vissel Kobe	Kobe, Japan
2026–27 AFC Champions League Two	Group stage	1–1	(Vietnam) Thể Công–Viettel	Hanoi, Vietnam
2026–27 AFC Champions League Two	Group stage	3–0	(South Korea) FC Seoul	Melbourne, Australia
2026–27 AFC Champions League Two	Group stage	0–2	(Indonesia) Persib	Soreang, Indonesia
2026–27 AFC Champions League Two	Group stage	1–2	(Indonesia) Persib	Melbourne, Australia
2026–27 AFC Champions League Two	Group stage		(Vietnam) Thể Công–Viettel	Melbourne, Australia
2026–27 AFC Champions League Two	Group stage		(South Korea) FC Seoul	Seoul, South Korea

=== Newcastle Jets ===
Newcastle Jets results
Season	Round	Result	Opponent	Venue
2009 AFC Champions League	Group stage	0–2	(China) Beijing Guoan	Beijing, China
2009 AFC Champions League	Group stage	2–0	(South Korea) Ulsan Hyundai FC	Newcastle, Australia
2009 AFC Champions League	Group stage	1–1	(Japan) Nagoya Grampus	Nagoya, Japan
2009 AFC Champions League	Group stage	0–1	(Japan) Nagoya Grampus	Newcastle, Australia
2009 AFC Champions League	Group stage	2–1	(China) Beijing Guoan	Newcastle, Australia
2009 AFC Champions League	Group stage	1–0	(South Korea) Ulsan Hyundai FC	Ulsan, South Korea
2009 AFC Champions League	Round of 16	0–6	(South Korea) Pohang Steelers	Pohang, South Korea
2019 AFC Champions League	Preliminary round 2	3–1	(Indonesia) Persija Jakarta	Newcastle, Australia
2019 AFC Champions League	Play-off round	1–4	(Japan) Kashima Antlers	Kashima, Japan
2026–27 AFC Champions League Elite	League stage	1–7	(Japan) Kashima Antlers	Kashima, Japan
2026–27 AFC Champions League Elite	League stage	1–3	(Japan) Gamba Osaka	Newcastle, Australia
2026–27 AFC Champions League Elite	League stage	2–5	(Japan) Kyoto Sanga	Kameoka, Japan
2026–27 AFC Champions League Elite	League stage	2–4	(China) Shanghai Port	Newcastle, Australia
2026–27 AFC Champions League Elite	League stage		(Japan) Kashiwa Reysol	Gosford, Australia
2026–27 AFC Champions League Elite	League stage		(Japan) Vissel Kobe	Kobe, Japan
2026–27 AFC Champions League Elite	League stage		(Malaysia) Johor Darul Ta'zim	Newcastle, Australia
2026–27 AFC Champions League Elite	League stage		(China) Beijing Guoan	Beijing, China

=== Perth Glory ===
Perth Glory results
Season	Round	Result	Opponent	Venue
2020 AFC Champions League	Group stage	0–1	(Japan) FC Tokyo	Tokyo, Japan
2020 AFC Champions League	Group stage	1–2	(China) Shanghai Shenhua	Doha, Qatar
2020 AFC Champions League	Group stage	1–2	(South Korea) Ulsan Hyundai	Doha, Qatar
2020 AFC Champions League	Group stage	0–2	(South Korea) Ulsan Hyundai	Doha, Qatar
2020 AFC Champions League	Group stage	3–3	(China) Shanghai Shenhua	Doha, Qatar
2020 AFC Champions League	Group stage	0–1	(Japan) FC Tokyo	Doha, Qatar

=== Sydney FC ===
Sydney FC results
Season	Round	Result	Opponent	Venue
2007 AFC Champions League	Group stage	2–1	(China) Shanghai Shenhua	Shanghai, China
2007 AFC Champions League	Group stage	2–2	(Japan) Urawa Red Diamonds	Sydney, Australia
2007 AFC Champions League	Group stage	1–2	(Indonesia) Persik Kediri	Surakarta, Indonesia
2007 AFC Champions League	Group stage	3–0	(Indonesia) Persik Kediri	Sydney, Australia
2007 AFC Champions League	Group stage	0–0	(China) Shanghai Shenhua	Sydney, Australia
2007 AFC Champions League	Group stage	0–0	(Japan) Urawa Red Diamonds	Saitama, Japan
2011 AFC Champions League	Group stage	0–0	(South Korea) Suwon Samsung Bluewings	Sydney, Australia
2011 AFC Champions League	Group stage	1–1	(China) Shanghai Shenhua	Sydney, Australia
2011 AFC Champions League	Group stage	0–3	(Japan) Kashima Antlers	Sydney, Australia
2011 AFC Champions League	Group stage	3–2	(China) Shanghai Shenhua	Shanghai, China
2011 AFC Champions League	Group stage	1–3	(South Korea) Suwon Samsung Bluewings	Suwon, South Korea
2011 AFC Champions League	Group stage	1–2	(Japan) Kashima Antlers	Tokyo, Japan
2016 AFC Champions League	Group stage	0–2	(Japan) Urawa Red Diamonds	Saitama, Japan
2016 AFC Champions League	Group stage	2–1	(China) Guangzhou Evergrande Taobao	Sydney, Australia
2016 AFC Champions League	Group stage	1–0	(South Korea) Pohang Steelers	Pohang, South Korea
2016 AFC Champions League	Group stage	1–0	(South Korea) Pohang Steelers	Sydney, Australia
2016 AFC Champions League	Group stage	0–0	(Japan) Urawa Red Diamonds	Sydney, Australia
2016 AFC Champions League	Group stage	0–1	(China) Guangzhou Evergrande Taobao	Guangzhou, China
2016 AFC Champions League	Round of 16	1–1	(China) Shandong Luneng Taishan	Jinan, China
2016 AFC Champions League	Round of 16	2–2	(China) Shandong Luneng Taishan	Sydney, Australia
2018 AFC Champions League	Group stage	0–2	(South Korea) Suwon Samsung Bluewings	Sydney, Australia
2018 AFC Champions League	Group stage	2–2	(China) Shanghai Shenhua	Shanghai, China
2018 AFC Champions League	Group stage	0–2	(Japan) Kashima Antlers	Sydney, Australia
2018 AFC Champions League	Group stage	1–1	(Japan) Kashima Antlers	Kashima, Japan
2018 AFC Champions League	Group stage	4–1	(South Korea) Suwon Samsung Bluewings	Suwon, South Korea
2018 AFC Champions League	Group stage	0–0	(China) Shanghai Shenhua	Sydney, Australia
2019 AFC Champions League	Group stage	0–0	(South Korea) Ulsan Hyundai	Sydney, Australia
2019 AFC Champions League	Group stage	0–1	(Japan) Kawasaki Frontale	Kawasaki, Japan
2019 AFC Champions League	Group stage	3–3	(China) Shanghai SIPG	Sydney, Australia
2019 AFC Champions League	Group stage	2–2	(China) Shanghai SIPG	Shanghai, China
2019 AFC Champions League	Group stage	0–1	(South Korea) Ulsan Hyundai	Ulsan, South Korea
2019 AFC Champions League	Group stage	0–4	(Japan) Kawasaki Frontale	Sydney, Australia
2020 AFC Champions League	Group stage	0–4	(Japan) Yokohama F. Marinos	Yokohama, Japan
2020 AFC Champions League	Group stage	2–2	(South Korea) Jeonbuk Hyundai Motors	Sydney, Australia
2020 AFC Champions League	Group stage	1–2	(China) Shanghai SIPG	Doha, Qatar
2020 AFC Champions League	Group stage	0–1	(South Korea) Jeonbuk Hyundai Motors	Al Wakrah, Qatar
2020 AFC Champions League	Group stage	4–0	(China) Shanghai SIPG	Al Wakrah, Qatar
2020 AFC Champions League	Group stage	1–1	(Japan) Yokohama F. Marinos	Al Wakrah, Qatar
2022 AFC Champions League	Preliminary round	5–0	(Philippines) Kaya–Iloilo	Sydney, Australia
2022 AFC Champions League	Group stage	0–0	(South Korea) Jeonbuk Hyundai Motors	Ho Chi Minh City, Vietnam
2022 AFC Champions League	Group stage	1–1	(Vietnam) Hoàng Anh Gia Lai	Ho Chi Minh City, Vietnam
2022 AFC Champions League	Group stage	0–1	(Japan) Yokohama F. Marinos	Ho Chi Minh City, Vietnam
2022 AFC Champions League	Group stage	0–3	(Japan) Yokohama F. Marinos	Ho Chi Minh City, Vietnam
2022 AFC Champions League	Group stage	2–3	(South Korea) Jeonbuk Hyundai Motors	Ho Chi Minh City, Vietnam
2022 AFC Champions League	Group stage	0–1	(Vietnam) Hoàng Anh Gia Lai	Ho Chi Minh City, Vietnam
2024–25 AFC Champions League Two	Group stage	5–0	(Hong Kong) Eastern	Sydney, Australia
2024–25 AFC Champions League Two	Group stage	4–1	(Philippines) Kaya–Iloilo	Manila, Philippines
2024–25 AFC Champions League Two	Group stage	1–2	(Japan) Sanfrecce Hiroshima	Hiroshima, Japan
2024–25 AFC Champions League Two	Group stage	0–1	(Japan) Sanfrecce Hiroshima	Sydney, Australia
2024–25 AFC Champions League Two	Group stage	4–1	(Hong Kong) Eastern	Hong Kong
2024–25 AFC Champions League Two	Group stage	3–1	(Philippines) Kaya–Iloilo	Sydney, Australia
2024–25 AFC Champions League Two	Round of 16	2–2	(Thailand) Bangkok United	Sydney, Australia
2024–25 AFC Champions League Two	Round of 16	3–2 (a.e.t.)	(Thailand) Bangkok United	Rangsit, Thailand
2024–25 AFC Champions League Two	Quarter-finals	2–0	(South Korea) Jeonbuk Hyundai Motors	Jeonju, South Korea
2024–25 AFC Champions League Two	Quarter-finals	3–2	(South Korea) Jeonbuk Hyundai Motors	Sydney, Australia
2024–25 AFC Champions League Two	Semi-finals	0–2	(Singapore) Lion City Sailors	Singapore
2024–25 AFC Champions League Two	Semi-finals	1–0	(Singapore) Lion City Sailors	Sydney, Australia

=== Western Sydney Wanderers ===
Western Sydney Wanderers results
Season	Round	Result	Opponent	Venue
2014 AFC Champions League	Group stage	1–3	(South Korea) Ulsan Hyundai	Sydney, Australia
2014 AFC Champions League	Group stage	1–0	(China) Guizhou Renhe	Guiyang, China
2014 AFC Champions League	Group stage	1–0	(Japan) Kawasaki Frontale	Sydney, Australia
2014 AFC Champions League	Group stage	1–2	(Japan) Kawasaki Frontale	Kawasaki, Japan
2014 AFC Champions League	Group stage	2–0	(South Korea) Ulsan Hyundai	Ulsan, South Korea
2014 AFC Champions League	Group stage	5–0	(China) Guizhou Renhe	Sydney, Australia
2014 AFC Champions League	Round of 16	1–3	(Japan) Sanfrecce Hiroshima	Hiroshima, Japan
2014 AFC Champions League	Round of 16	2–0	(Japan) Sanfrecce Hiroshima	Sydney, Australia
2014 AFC Champions League	Quarter-final	1–0	(China) Guangzhou Evergrande	Sydney, Australia
2014 AFC Champions League	Quarter-final	1–2	(China) Guangzhou Evergrande	Guangzhou, China
2014 AFC Champions League	Semi-final	0–0	(South Korea) FC Seoul	Seoul, South Korea
2014 AFC Champions League	Semi-final	2–0	(South Korea) FC Seoul	Sydney, Australia
2014 AFC Champions League	Final	1–0	(Saudi Arabia) Al-Hilal	Sydney, Australia
2014 AFC Champions League	Final	0–0	(Saudi Arabia) Al-Hilal	Riyadh, Saudi Arabia
2015 AFC Champions League	Group stage	3–1	(Japan) Kashima Antlers	Kashima, Japan
2015 AFC Champions League	Group stage	2–3	(China) Guangzhou Evergrande Taobao	Sydney, Australia
2015 AFC Champions League	Group stage	0–0	(South Korea) FC Seoul	Seoul, South Korea
2015 AFC Champions League	Group stage	1–1	(South Korea) FC Seoul	Sydney, Australia
2015 AFC Champions League	Group stage	1–2	(Japan) Kashima Antlers	Sydney, Australia
2015 AFC Champions League	Group stage	2–0	(China) Guangzhou Evergrande Taobao	Guangzhou, China
2017 AFC Champions League	Group stage	0–4	(Japan) Urawa Red Diamonds	Sydney, Australia
2017 AFC Champions League	Group stage	1–5	(China) Shanghai SIPG	Shanghai, China
2017 AFC Champions League	Group stage	3–2	(South Korea) FC Seoul	Seoul, South Korea
2017 AFC Champions League	Group stage	2–3	(South Korea) FC Seoul	Sydney, Australia
2017 AFC Champions League	Group stage	1–6	(Japan) Urawa Red Diamonds	Saitama, Japan
2017 AFC Champions League	Group stage	3–2	(China) Shanghai SIPG	Sydney, Australia

== Statistics by opponent's league (men) ==
=== Australia ===
Against A-League Men clubs
Team	Pld	W	D	L	GF	GA	GD	Pts
Central Coast Mariners	1	1	0	0	3	2	+1	3
Macarthur FC	1	0	0	1	2	3	−1	0
Total	2	1	0	1	5	5	0	3

=== Cambodia ===
Against Cambodian Premier League clubs
Team	Pld	W	D	L	GF	GA	GD	Pts
Central Coast Mariners	1	1	0	0	4	0	+4	3
Macarthur FC	2	1	0	1	5	3	+2	3
Total	3	2	0	1	9	3	+6	6

=== China ===
Against Chinese Super League clubs
Team	Pld	W	D	L	GF	GA	GD	Pts
Sydney FC	14	4	8	2	22	17	+5	20
Western Sydney Wanderers	8	5	0	3	16	12	+4	15
Melbourne Victory	14	4	3	7	15	26	−11	15
Central Coast Mariners	14	3	3	8	19	25	−6	12
Brisbane Roar	5	2	2	1	5	3	+2	8
Macarthur FC	2	2	0	0	5	1	+4	6
Adelaide United	9	1	3	5	6	9	−3	6
Melbourne City	2	1	1	0	3	2	+1	4
Newcastle Jets	3	1	0	2	4	7	−3	3
Perth Glory	2	0	1	1	4	5	−1	1
Total	73	23	21	29	99	107	−8	90

=== Hong Kong ===
Against Hong Kong Premier League clubs
Team	Pld	W	D	L	GF	GA	GD	Pts
Sydney FC	2	2	0	0	9	1	+8	6
Adelaide United	1	1	0	0	3	0	+3	3
Macarthur FC	2	1	0	1	3	3	0	3
Total	5	4	0	1	15	4	+11	12

=== India ===
Against Indian Super League clubs
Team	Pld	W	D	L	GF	GA	GD	Pts
Central Coast Mariners	2	1	1	0	4	0	+4	4
Total	2	1	1	0	4	0	+4	4

=== Indonesia ===
Against Liga 1 clubs
Team	Pld	W	D	L	GF	GA	GD	Pts
Central Coast Mariners	2	2	0	0	8	4	+4	6
Adelaide United	1	1	0	0	3	0	+3	3
Melbourne Victory	3	1	0	2	6	4	+2	3
Sydney FC	2	1	0	1	4	2	+2	3
Newcastle Jets	1	1	0	0	3	1	+2	3
Total	9	6	0	3	24	11	+13	18

=== Japan ===
Against J1 League clubs
Team	Pld	W	D	L	GF	GA	GD	Pts
Melbourne Victory	16	5	3	8	21	32	−11	18
Adelaide United	11	5	2	4	13	15	−2	17
Western Sydney Wanderers	8	3	0	5	10	18	−8	9
Brisbane Roar	6	2	0	4	6	12	−6	6
Melbourne City	5	1	2	2	5	7	–2	5
Sydney FC	16	0	5	16	6	29	−23	5
Central Coast Mariners	11	1	1	9	7	28	−21	4
Newcastle Jets	6	0	1	5	6	21	−15	1
Perth Glory	2	0	0	2	0	2	−2	0
Total	81	17	14	50	74	164	−90	65

=== Kyrgyzstan ===
Against Kyrgyz Premier League clubs
Team	Pld	W	D	L	GF	GA	GD	Pts
Central Coast Mariners	2	1	1	0	4	1	+3	4
Total	2	1	1	0	4	1	+3	4

=== Lebanon ===
Against Lebanese Premier League clubs
Team	Pld	W	D	L	GF	GA	GD	Pts
Central Coast Mariners	1	1	0	0	1	0	+1	3
Total	1	1	0	0	1	0	+1	3

=== Malaysia ===
Against Malaysia Super League clubs
Team	Pld	W	D	L	GF	GA	GD	Pts
Macarthur FC	1	1	0	0	3	0	+3	3
Melbourne City	1	1	0	0	2	0	+2	3
Central Coast Mariners	3	0	1	2	2	4	−2	1
Total	5	2	1	2	7	4	+3	7

=== Myanmar ===
Against Myanmar National League clubs
Team	Pld	W	D	L	GF	GA	GD	Pts
Macarthur FC	2	2	0	0	7	0	+7	6
Total	2	2	0	0	7	0	+7	6

=== Philippines ===
Against Philippines Football League clubs
Team	Pld	W	D	L	GF	GA	GD	Pts
Sydney FC	3	3	0	0	12	2	+10	9
Central Coast Mariners	2	2	0	0	12	1	+11	6
Macarthur FC	2	2	0	0	11	2	+9	6
Melbourne City	2	2	0	0	6	0	+6	6
Brisbane Roar	2	1	0	1	8	3	+5	3
Total	11	10	0	1	49	8	+41	30

=== Saudi Arabia ===
Against Saudi Professional League clubs
Team	Pld	W	D	L	GF	GA	GD	Pts
Western Sydney Wanderers	2	1	1	0	1	0	+1	4
Total	2	1	1	0	1	0	+1	4

=== Singapore ===
Against Singapore Premier League clubs
Team	Pld	W	D	L	GF	GA	GD	Pts
Sydney FC	2	1	0	1	1	2	−1	3
Adelaide United	2	0	0	2	0	7	−7	0
Total	4	1	0	3	1	9	−8	3

=== South Korea ===
Against K League clubs
Team	Pld	W	D	L	GF	GA	GD	Pts
Sydney FC	14	5	4	5	16	15	+1	19
Adelaide United	11	5	3	3	15	11	+4	18
Melbourne Victory	20	3	8	9	23	36	−13	17
Western Sydney Wanderers	8	3	3	2	11	9	+2	12
Melbourne City	5	2	3	0	6	4	+2	9
Newcastle Jets	3	2	0	1	3	6	−3	6
Central Coast Mariners	8	1	3	4	4	12	−8	6
Brisbane Roar	6	0	2	4	8	18	−10	2
Perth Glory	2	0	0	2	1	4	−3	0
Total	77	21	26	30	87	115	−28	86

=== Thailand ===
Against Thai League 1 clubs
Team	Pld	W	D	L	GF	GA	GD	Pts
Melbourne Victory	5	3	1	1	9	7	+2	10
Melbourne City	7	2	4	1	6	4	+2	10
Sydney FC	2	1	1	0	5	4	+1	4
Adelaide United	1	1	0	0	2	1	+1	3
Brisbane Roar	3	0	2	1	0	3	−3	2
Macarthur FC	2	0	1	1	2	4	−2	1
Central Coast Mariners	1	0	0	1	1	2	−1	0
Total	21	7	9	5	25	25	0	30

=== Uzbekistan ===
Against Uzbekistan Super League clubs
Team	Pld	W	D	L	GF	GA	GD	Pts
Adelaide United	6	2	2	2	9	7	+2	8
Total	6	2	2	2	9	7	+2	8

=== Vietnam ===
Against V.League 1 clubs
Team	Pld	W	D	L	GF	GA	GD	Pts
Adelaide United	5	4	0	1	11	4	+7	12
Macarthur FC	2	1	1	0	3	2	+1	4
Melbourne Victory	1	0	1	0	1	1	0	1
Sydney FC	2	0	1	1	1	2	−1	1
Total	10	5	3	2	16	9	+7	18

== Records (men) ==
- Best Finish: Western Sydney Wanderers 2014, Champions
- Biggest Crowd: 26,857 (in 2008) Melbourne Victory vs Gamba Osaka
- Best Result: Brisbane Roar in 2017, 6–0 vs Global
- Worst Result: Newcastle Jets in 2009, 0–6 vs Pohang Steelers, Brisbane Roar in 2017, 0–6 vs Ulsan Hyundai
- Most Appearances: 9 – Melbourne Victory (2008, 2010, 2011, 2014, 2016, 2018, 2019, 2020, 2022)

=== Top scorers ===
==== Asian Champions League / AFC Champions League Elite ====
As of 11 February 2025 (not including qualifying rounds).

Club lists clubs for which continental goals were scored.

Rank	Footballer	Club	2007	2008	2009	2010	2011	2012	2013	2014	2015	2016	2017	2018	2019	2020	2022	2023–24	2024–25	Total
Reference:																				Total
1	(Albania) / (Kosovo) Besart Berisha	Brisbane Roar; Melbourne Victory						2				4		2						8
1	(Australia) Travis Dodd	Adelaide United	4	3		1														8
3	(Malta) Trent Buhagiar	Sydney FC														5	1			6
3	(Australia) Jamie Maclaren	Brisbane Roar; Melbourne City											3				2	1		6
3	(Australia) Kevin Muscat	Melbourne Victory		2		1	3													6
6	(New Zealand) Kosta Barbarouses	Melbourne Victory; Sydney FC								2		1		2						5
6	(Australia) Mark Bridge	Sydney FC; Western Sydney Wanderers					1			2	2									5
8	(Australia) Danny Allsopp	Melbourne Victory		3			1													4
8	(Australia) Alex Brosque	Sydney FC	1											2	1					4
8	(Australia) Steve Corica	Sydney FC	4																	4
8	(Australia) Robert Cornthwaite	Adelaide United		2		2														4
8	(Brazil) Diego	Adelaide United		4																4
8	(Australia) Tomi Juric	Western Sydney Wanderers								3		1								4
8	(England) Adam Le Fondre	Sydney FC													2	1	1			4

==== AFC Cup / AFC Champions League Two ====
As of 19 February 2026 (not including qualifying rounds).

Club lists clubs for which continental goals were scored.

Rank	Footballer	Club	2023–24	2024–25	2025–26	Total
Reference						Total
1	(Brazil) Marco Túlio	Central Coast Mariners	8			8
2	(Poland) Patryk Klimala	Sydney FC		6		6
3	(Morocco) Anas Ouahim	Sydney FC		5		5
3	(Croatia) Adrian Segecic	Sydney FC		5		5
5	(Mexico) Ulises Dávila	Macarthur FC	4			4
5	(Australia) Jed Drew	Macarthur FC	4			4
5	(Brazil) Mikael Doka	Central Coast Mariners	4			4
5	(France) Valère Germain	Macarthur FC	4			4
9	(England) Joe Lolley	Sydney FC		3		3
9	(Australia) Tomislav Uskok	Macarthur FC	1		2	3

== Overview (women) ==
=== AFC allocation ===
AFC Women's Club Championship
Year	Group stage
2019	1
2021	0
2022	0
2023	1

AFC Women's Champions League
Year	Group stage	Playoff round
2024–25	1	0
2025–26	1	0
2026–27	1	0

=== Results ===
==== AFC Women's Club Championship ====
Team	Qualified	2019	2021	2022	2023
Melbourne Victory	1	4th	–	–	–
Sydney FC	1	–	–	–	GS

==== AFC Women's Champions League ====
Team	Qualified	2024–25	2025–26	2026–27
Melbourne City	3	RU	SF	QF

Legend:

- 4th : Fourth Place (2019 AFC women's club championship)
- GS : Group stage
- QF: Quarter-finals
- SF: Semi-finals
- F: Final
- RU: Runners-up

=== Statistics by club ===
==== AFC Women's Club Championship ====
#	Team	Pld	W	D	L	GF	GA	GD	Pts	Best Finish
1	Sydney FC	3	2	0	1	5	4	+1	6	Group stage
2	Melbourne Victory	3	0	1	2	1	10	−9	1	Group stage

==== AFC Women's Champions League ====
#	Team	Pld	W	D	L	GF	GA	GD	Pts	Best Finish
1	Melbourne City	14	11	1	2	41	8	+33	34	Runners-up

=== Statistics by season ===
Season	Pld	W	D	L	GF	GA	GD	Pts
2019	3	0	1	2	1	10	−9	1
2023	3	2	0	1	5	4	+1	6
2024–25	6	5	1	0	14	2	+12	16
2025–26	5	4	0	1	18	4	+14	12
2026–27	3	2	0	1	9	2	+7	6
Total	20	13	2	5	47	22	+25	41

== Games by club (women) ==
Win Draw Loss

=== Melbourne City ===
Melbourne City results
Season	Round	Result	Opponent	Venue
2024–25 AFC Women's Champions League	Group stage	2–1	(Iran) Bam Khatoon	Pathum Thani, Thailand
2024–25 AFC Women's Champions League	Group stage	3–0	(Thailand) College of Asian Scholars	Pathum Thani, Thailand
2024–25 AFC Women's Champions League	Group stage	4–0	(Philippines) Kaya–Iloilo	Pathum Thani, Thailand
2024–25 AFC Women's Champions League	Quarter-final	3–0	(Chinese Taipei) Taichung Blue Whale	Melbourne, Australia
2024–25 AFC Women's Champions League	Semi-final	1–0	(South Korea) Incheon Red Angels	Wuhan, China
2024–25 AFC Women's Champions League	Final	1–1 (a.e.t.) (4–5 (p))	(China) Wuhan Jiangda	Wuhan, China
2025–26 AFC Women's Champions League	Group stage	5–0	(Singapore) Lion City Sailors	Ho Chi Minh City, Vietnam
2025–26 AFC Women's Champions League	Group stage	7–0	(Philippines) Stallion Laguna	Ho Chi Minh City, Vietnam
2025–26 AFC Women's Champions League	Group stage	3–0	(Vietnam) Hồ Chí Minh City	Ho Chi Minh City, Vietnam
2025–26 AFC Women's Champions League	Quarter-final	2–1	(Uzbekistan) Nasaf	Melbourne, Australia
2025–26 AFC Women's Champions League	Semi-final	1–3	(Japan) Tokyo Verdy Beleza	Suwon, South Korea
2026–27 AFC Women's Champions League	Group stage	0–2	(Uzbekistan) Nasaf	Qarshi, Uzbekistan
2026–27 AFC Women's Champions League	Group stage	7–0	(Philippines) Kaya–Iloilo	Qarshi, Uzbekistan
2026–27 AFC Women's Champions League	Group stage	2–0	(China) Beijing Jingtan	Qarshi, Uzbekistan

=== Melbourne Victory ===
Melbourne Victory results
Season	Round	Result	Opponent	Venue
2019 AFC Women's Club Championship	Group stage	0–4	(South Korea) Incheon Hyundai WFC	Yongin, South Korea
2019 AFC Women's Club Championship	Group stage	1–1	(China) Jiangsu Suning	Yongin, South Korea
2019 AFC Women's Club Championship	Group stage	0–5	(Japan) Nippon TV Beleza	Yongin, South Korea

=== Sydney FC ===
Sydney FC results
Season	Round	Result	Opponent	Venue
2023 AFC Women's Club Championship	Group stage	3–0	(Iran) Bam Khatoon	Tashkent, Uzbekistan
2023 AFC Women's Club Championship	Group stage	2–1	(Uzbekistan) FC Nasaf	Tashkent, Uzbekistan
2023 AFC Women's Club Championship	Group stage	0–3	(South Korea) Incheon Hyundai WFC	Tashkent, Uzbekistan

== Statistics by opponent's league (women) ==
=== China ===
Against Chinese Women's Super League clubs
Team	Pld	W	D	L	GF	GA	GD	Pts
Melbourne City	2	1	1	0	3	1	+2	4
Melbourne Victory	1	0	1	0	1	1	0	1
Total	3	1	2	0	4	2	+2	5

=== Chinese Taipei ===
Against Taiwan Mulan Football League clubs
Team	Pld	W	D	L	GF	GA	GD	Pts
Melbourne City	1	1	0	0	3	0	+3	3
Total	1	1	0	0	3	0	+3	3

=== Iran ===
Against Kowsar Women Football League clubs
Team	Pld	W	D	L	GF	GA	GD	Pts
Sydney FC	1	1	0	0	3	0	+3	3
Melbourne City	1	1	0	0	2	1	+1	3
Total	2	2	0	0	5	1	+4	6

=== Japan ===
Against WE League clubs
Team	Pld	W	D	L	GF	GA	GD	Pts
Melbourne City	1	0	0	1	1	3	−2	0
Melbourne Victory	1	0	0	1	0	5	−5	0
Total	2	0	0	2	1	8	−7	0

=== Philippines ===
Against PFF Women's League clubs
Team	Pld	W	D	L	GF	GA	GD	Pts
Melbourne City	3	3	0	0	18	0	+18	9
Total	3	3	0	0	18	0	+18	9

=== Singapore ===
Against Women's Premier League clubs
Team	Pld	W	D	L	GF	GA	GD	Pts
Melbourne City	1	1	0	0	5	0	+5	3
Total	1	1	0	0	5	0	+5	3

=== South Korea ===
Against WK League clubs
Team	Pld	W	D	L	GF	GA	GD	Pts
Melbourne City	1	1	0	0	1	0	+1	3
Sydney FC	1	0	0	1	0	3	−3	0
Melbourne Victory	1	0	0	1	0	4	−4	0
Total	3	1	0	2	1	7	–6	3

=== Thailand ===
Against Thai Women's League clubs
Team	Pld	W	D	L	GF	GA	GD	Pts
Melbourne City	1	1	0	0	3	0	+3	3
Total	1	1	0	0	3	0	+3	3

=== Uzbekistan ===
Against Uzbekistan Women's League clubs
Team	Pld	W	D	L	GF	GA	GD	Pts
Sydney FC	1	1	0	0	2	1	+1	3
Melbourne City	2	1	0	1	2	3	–1	3
Total	3	2	0	1	4	4	0	6

=== Vietnam ===
Against Women's National League clubs
Team	Pld	W	D	L	GF	GA	GD	Pts
Melbourne City	1	1	0	0	3	0	+3	3
Total	1	1	0	0	3	0	+3	3

== Records (women) ==
- Best Finish: Melbourne City 2024–25, Runners-up (Champions League)
- Biggest Crowd: 310 (in 2019) Melbourne Victory vs Incheon Hyundai WFC
- Best Result: Melbourne City in 2025, 7–0 vs Stallion Laguna
- Worst Result: Melbourne Victory in 2009, 0–5 vs Nippon TV Beleza
- Most Appearances: 1 – Melbourne City (2023) (Champions League)

=== Top scorers ===
==== AFC Women's Club Championship / AFC Women's Champions League ====
As of 20 May 2026 (not including qualifying rounds).

Rank	Footballer	Club	2019	2023	2024–25	2025–26	Total
Reference:							Total
1	(Australia) Holly McNamara	Melbourne City			1	4	5
2	(Venezuela) Mariana Speckmaier	Melbourne City			4		4
2	(England) Fiona Worts	Sydney FC		4			4
4	(Mexico) Lourdes Bosch	Melbourne City			3		3
4	(Australia) Aideen Keane	Sydney FC; Melbourne City		1		2	3
4	(Australia) Shelby McMahon	Melbourne City			2	1	3
7	(Australia) Alexia Apostolakis	Melbourne City				2	2
7	(Australia) Danella Butrus	Melbourne City				2	2
7	(New Zealand) Deven Jackson	Melbourne City				2	2
7	(Australia) Leticia McKenna	Melbourne City				2	2

== See also ==
- Central Coast Mariners in Asian football
- Sydney FC in international competition
- Western Sydney Wanderers in Asian football
