= Hwanggeum-dong =

Hwanggeum-dong, meaning "Gold District" in Korean can refer to several administrative wards in South Korean cities:

- Hwanggeum-dong, Gimcheon, Gyeongsangbuk-do
- Hwanggeum-dong, Gwangyang, Jeollabuk-do
- Hwanggeum-dong, Gwangju, Dong-gu, Gwangju
- Hwanggeum-dong, Daegu, Suseong-gu, Daegu
