= Hoengcheon station =

Railway station in South Korea

횡천
Hoengcheon
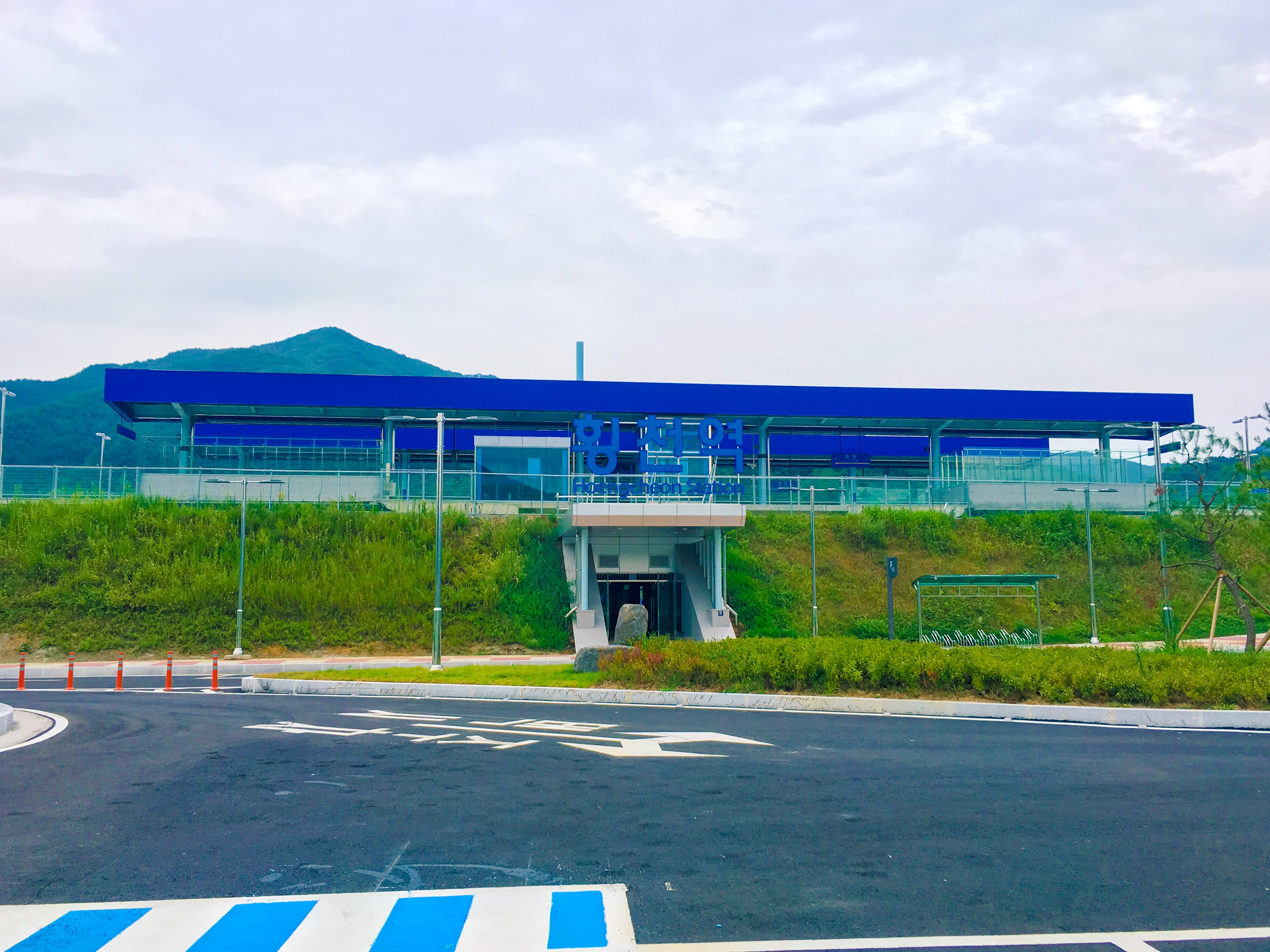

General information
- Location: South Korea
- Coordinates: 35°5′58″N 127°48′5″E
- Operator: Korail
- Line: Gyeongjeon Line

Construction
- Structure type: Aboveground

Services
Preceding station	Korail	Following station
Bukcheon towards Bujeon	Mugunghwa-ho Gyeongjeon Line	Hadong towards Suncheon
Bukcheon towards Bujeon	Mugunghwa-ho Mokpo–Boseong Line	Hadong towards Mokpo
Location
Location within South Korea

Hoengcheon Station is a railway station in South Korea. It is on the Gyeongjeon Line.
