= Hadong station =

Railway station in South Korea

하동
Hadong
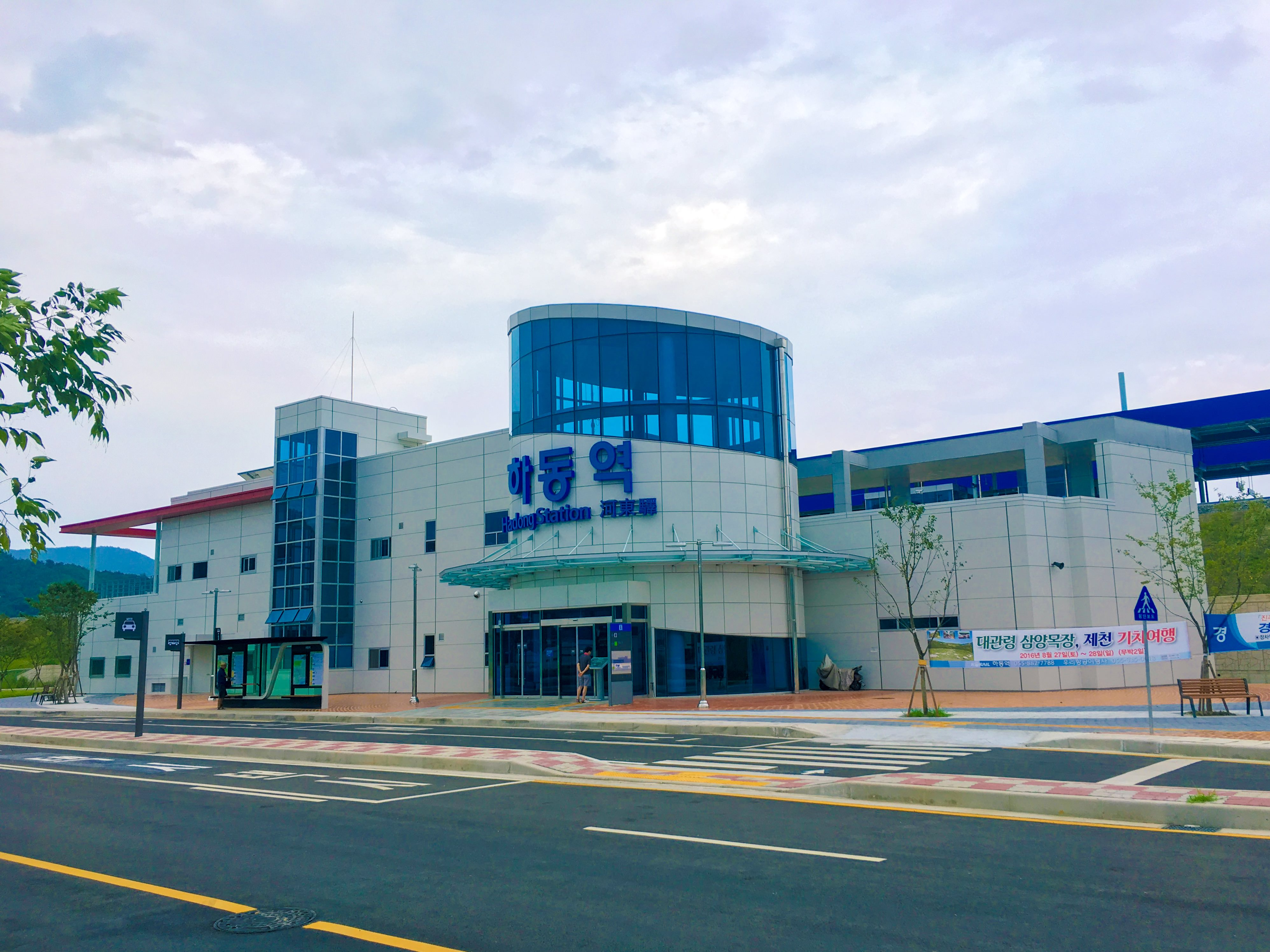

General information
- Location: South Korea
- Coordinates: 35°3′49″N 127°45′42″E
- Operator: Korail
- Line: Gyeongjeon Line

Construction
- Structure type: Aboveground

Services
Preceding station	Korail	Following station
Gwangyang towards Mokpo	Saemaeul-ho Mokpo–Boseong Line	Jinju towards Bujeon
Hoengcheon towards Bujeon	Mugunghwa-ho Gyeongjeon Line	Jinsang towards Suncheon
Hoengcheon towards Bujeon	Mugunghwa-ho Mokpo–Boseong Line	Jinsang towards Mokpo
Jinju towards Busan	S-Train East	Suncheon towards Mokpo
Location
Location within South Korea

Hadong Station is a railway station in South Korea located at Bipa-ri, Hadong-eup, Hadong-gun, South Gyeongsang Province. It is on the Gyeongjeon Line. As of 2016 the Mugunghwa-ho train stops at the station eight times a day. From September 27, 2013, the S-Train made four round trips per day, but this was changed in December 2013 to two round trips per day.

Many cherry blossom trees have been planted in a row on the south side of the platform, and in early April, when the cherry blossoms begin to bloom, many tourists flock to the station to take pictures, or for a date.

== History ==
- October 5, 1967: Construction started on the station
- February 7, 1968: Operation commenced as a regular station
- February 29, 1968: Construction completed on the station
- March 26, 1973: Designated as the arrival processing station for civilian-use coal
- May 1, 2006: Handling of parcels suspended
- October 31, 2009: Handling of freight suspended
- September 27, 2013: Became a stop for the S-Train
