= Western Sydney Wanderers FC in international football =

Western Sydney Wanderers in international football
- Club: Western Sydney Wanderers FC
- Most appearances: Shannon Cole & Labinot Haliti (21)
- Top scorer: Tomi Juric & Mark Bridge (4)
- First entry: 2014 AFC Champions League
- Latest entry: 2017 AFC Champions League

Titles
- Champions League: 1: 2014

Western Sydney Wanderers Football Club is an Australian professional association football club based in Rooty Hill, New South Wales. They play in the A-League and their home ground is Bankwest Stadium. They have qualified for the AFC Champions League three times, in 2014, 2015 and 2017. They won in their first attempt, defeating Al Hilal SFC 1–0 over the two legged final, becoming the first Australian team to win the tournament. In the other two occasions, they got knocked out in the group stage of the tournament.

After their Champions League win in 2014, they went on to represent the Asian Football Confederation at the 2014 FIFA Club World Cup. They lost to Mexican club Cruz Azul in the quarter-finals 3–1 after extra time and in the fifth placed playoff, they lost to Algerian side ES Sétif 2–2 (5–4 on penalties).

== Tournaments ==
=== 2014 AFC Champions League ===
==== Group H ====
Pos	Team	Pld	W	D	L	GF	GA	GD	Pts	Qualification	(Australia) WSW	(Japan) KAW	(South Korea) ULS	(China) GUI
1	(Australia) Western Sydney Wanderers	6	4	0	2	11	5	+6	12	Advanced to Round of 16		1–0	1–3	5–0
2	(Japan) Kawasaki Frontale	6	4	0	2	7	5	+2	12	Advanced to Round of 16	2–1		3–1	1–0
3	(South Korea) Ulsan Hyundai	6	2	1	3	8	10	−2	7		0–2	2–0		1–1
4	(China) Guizhou Renhe	6	1	1	4	4	10	−6	4		0–1	0–1	3–1	

Legend: Blue = home team win; Yellow = draw; Red = away team win.

26 February 2014	Western Sydney Wanderers (Australia)	1–3	(South Korea) Ulsan Hyundai	Parramatta Stadium, Sydney
19:30 UTC+11	Šantalab 1'	Report	Kim Shin-wook 35'; Ko Chang-hyun 43'; Kang Min-soo 66'	Attendance: 11,212; Referee: Abdullah Al Hilali (Oman)

12 March 2014	Guizhou Renhe (China)	0–1	(Australia) Western Sydney Wanderers	Guiyang Olympic Sports Center, Guiyang
20:00 UTC+8		Report	Bridge 10'	Attendance: 21,184; Referee: Muhammad Taqi Aljaafari Bin Jahari (Singapore)

19 March 2014	Western Sydney Wanderers (Australia)	1–0	(Japan) Kawasaki Frontale	Parramatta Stadium, Sydney
19:30 UTC+11	Haliti 3'	Report		Attendance: 9,292; Referee: Ng Kai Lam (Hong Kong)

1 April 2014	Kawasaki Frontale (Japan)	2–1	(Australia) Western Sydney Wanderers	Todoroki Athletics Stadium, Kawasaki
19:00 UTC+9	Nakamura 74'; Oshima 88'	Report	Haliti 24'	Attendance: 10,943; Referee: Fahad Al-Mirdasi (Saudi Arabia)

15 April 2014	Ulsan Hyundai (South Korea)	0–2	(Australia) Western Sydney Wanderers	Ulsan Munsu Football Stadium, Ulsan
19:30 UTC+9		Report	Bridge 60'; Šantalab 80'	Attendance: 2,500; Referee: Abdullah Balideh (Qatar)

22 April 2014	Western Sydney Wanderers (Australia)	5–0	(China) Guizhou Renhe	Parramatta Stadium, Sydney
20:00 UTC+10	Cole 7'; Haliti 75'; Mooy 81' (pen.); Ono 85'; Topor-Stanley 88'	Report		Attendance: 11,099; Referee: Alireza Faghani (Iran)

==== Knockout stage ====
===== Round of 16 =====
7 May 2014	Sanfrecce Hiroshima (Japan)	3–1	(Australia) Western Sydney Wanderers	Hiroshima Big Arch, Hiroshima
19:00 UTC+9	Ishihara 51', 65'; Shibasaki 90+1'	Report	Juric 78' (pen.)	Attendance: 8,423; Referee: Abdullah Al Hilali (Oman)

14 May 2014	Western Sydney Wanderers (Australia)	2–0	(Japan) Sanfrecce Hiroshima	Parramatta Stadium, Sydney
19:30 UTC+10	Cole 55'; Šantalab 85'	Report		Attendance: 10,639; Referee: Nawaf Shukralla (Bahrain)

3–3 on aggregate. Western Sydney Wanderers won on away goals.

===== Quarter-final =====
20 August 2014	Western Sydney Wanderers (Australia)	1–0	(China) Guangzhou Evergrande	Parramatta Stadium, Sydney
19:30 UTC+10	Golec 60'	Report		Attendance: 17,093; Referee: Abdulla Hassan Mohamed (United Arab Emirates)

27 August 2014	Guangzhou Evergrande (China)	2–1	(Australia) Western Sydney Wanderers	Tianhe Stadium, Guangzhou
20:00 UTC+8	Diamanti 61'; Elkeson 90+1'	Report	Juric 58' (pen.)	Attendance: 39,874; Referee: Ryuji Sato (Japan)

2–2 on aggregate. Western Sydney Wanderers won on away goals.

===== Semi-final =====
17 September 2014	FC Seoul (South Korea)	0–0	(Australia) Western Sydney Wanderers	Seoul World Cup Stadium, Seoul
19:30 UTC+9		Report		Attendance: 12,901; Referee: Nawaf Shukralla (Bahrain)

1 October 2014	Western Sydney Wanderers (Australia)	2–0	(South Korea) FC Seoul	Parramatta Stadium, Sydney
19:30 UTC+10	Poljak 3'; Cole 64'	Report		Attendance: 18,896; Referee: Abdulrahman Abdou (Qatar)

Western Sydney Wanderers won 2–0 on aggregate.

===== Final =====
25 October 2014	Western Sydney Wanderers (Australia)	1–0	(Saudi Arabia) Al-Hilal	Parramatta Stadium, Sydney
19:30 UTC+11	Juric 64'	Report		Attendance: 20,053; Referee: Alireza Faghani (Iran)

1 November 2014	Al-Hilal (Saudi Arabia)	0–0	(Australia) Western Sydney Wanderers	King Fahd International Stadium, Riyadh
20:30 UTC+3		Report		Attendance: 63,763; Referee: Yuichi Nishimura (Japan)

Western Sydney Wanderers won 1–0 on aggregate.

=== 2014 FIFA Club World Cup ===
13 December 2014 Quarter-final	Cruz Azul (Mexico)	3–1 (a.e.t.)	(Australia) Western Sydney Wanderers	Prince Moulay Abdellah Stadium, Rabat
19:30	Torrado 89' (pen.), 118' (pen.); Pavone 108'	Report	La Rocca 65'	Attendance: 22,153; Referee: Noumandiez Doué (Ivory Coast)

17 December 2014 5th place play-off	ES Sétif (Algeria)	2–2 (5–4 p)	(Australia) Western Sydney Wanderers	Stade de Marrakech, Marrakesh
16:30	Mullen 50' (o.g.); Ziaya 57'	Report	Castelen 5'; Saba 89'	Attendance: 18,458; Referee: Norbert Hauata (Tahiti)
	Penalties
	Djahnit (penalty missed); Gasmi (penalty scored); Belameiri (penalty scored); Ziaya (penalty missed); Mellouli (penalty scored); Arroussi (penalty missed); Megateli (penalty scored); Zerara (penalty scored)		(penalty scored) Saba; (penalty missed) Haliti; (penalty scored) Trifiro; (penalty scored) Juric; (penalty missed) Bouzanis; (penalty missed) Mullen; (penalty scored) Fofanah; (penalty missed) Adeleke

=== 2015 AFC Champions League ===
==== Group H ====
Pos	Team	Pld	W	D	L	GF	GA	GD	Pts	Qualification	GET	SEO	WSW	KSM
1	(China) Guangzhou Evergrande	6	3	1	2	9	9	0	10	Advance to knockout stage	—	1–0	0–2	4–3
2	(South Korea) FC Seoul	6	2	3	1	5	4	+1	9	Advance to knockout stage	0–0	—	0–0	1–0
3	(Australia) Western Sydney Wanderers	6	2	2	2	9	7	+2	8		2–3	1–1	—	1–2
4	(Japan) Kashima Antlers	6	2	0	4	10	13	−3	6		2–1	2–3	1–3	—

Source: AFC

25 February 2015	Kashima Antlers (Japan)	1–3	(Australia) Western Sydney Wanderers	Kashima Soccer Stadium, Kashima
19:00 UTC+9	Doi 68'	Report	Shoji 54' (o.g.); Takahagi 86'; Bridge 90+3'	Attendance: 7,736; Referee: Fahad Al-Mirdasi (Saudi Arabia)

4 March 2015	Western Sydney Wanderers (Australia)	2–3	(China) Guangzhou Evergrande	Parramatta Stadium, Sydney
19:30 UTC+11	La Rocca 57'; Castelen 90+5'	Report	Goulart 19', 58', 64'	Attendance: 11,418; Referee: Nagor Amir Noor Mohamed (Malaysia)

18 March 2015	FC Seoul (South Korea)	0–0	(Australia) Western Sydney Wanderers	Seoul World Cup Stadium, Seoul
19:30 UTC+9		Report		Attendance: 5,645; Referee: Ammar Al-Jeneibi (United Arab Emirates)

7 April 2015	Western Sydney Wanderers (Australia)	1–1	(South Korea) FC Seoul	Parramatta Stadium, Sydney
19:30 UTC+10	Bulut 12'	Report	Go Yo-han 72'	Attendance: 7,073; Referee: Valentin Kovalenko (Uzbekistan)

21 April 2015	Western Sydney Wanderers (Australia)	1–2	(Japan) Kashima Antlers	Parramatta Stadium, Sydney
19:30 UTC+10	Rukavytsya 24'	Report	Doi 66'; Kanazaki 90+1'	Attendance: 5,221; Referee: Khamis Al-Marri (Qatar)

5 May 2015	Guangzhou Evergrande (China)	0–2	(Australia) Western Sydney Wanderers	Tianhe Stadium, Guangzhou
19:00 UTC+8		Report	Bridge 33'; Juric 90+3'	Attendance: 35,641; Referee: Nawaf Shukralla (Bahrain)

=== 2017 AFC Champions League ===
==== Group F ====
Pos	Team	Pld	W	D	L	GF	GA	GD	Pts	Qualification	URA	SSI	SEO	WSW
1	(Japan) Urawa Red Diamonds	6	4	0	2	18	7	+11	12 (Note: Head-to-head results: Shanghai SIPG 3–2 Urawa Red Diamonds, Urawa Red Diamonds 1–0 Shanghai SIPG (Urawa Red Diamonds won on away goals).)	Round of 16	—	1–0	5–2	6–1
2	(China) Shanghai SIPG	6	4	0	2	15	9	+6	12	Round of 16	3–2	—	4–2	5–1
3	(South Korea) FC Seoul	6	2	0	4	10	15	−5	6 (Note: Head-to-head results: FC Seoul 2–3 Western Sydney Wanderers, Western Sydney Wanderers 2–3 FC Seoul (tied on head-to-head results, ranked on total goal difference).)		1–0	0–1	—	2–3
4	(Australia) Western Sydney Wanderers	6	2	0	4	10	22	−12	6		0–4	3–2	2–3	—

Source: AFC
Rules for classification: Group stage tiebreakers
Notes:

21 February 2017	Western Sydney Wanderers (Australia)	0–4	(Japan) Urawa Red Diamonds	Campbelltown Stadium, Sydney
19:00 UTC+11		Report	Koroki 56'; Lee 58'; Makino 68'; Rafael Silva 86'	Attendance: 5,590; Referee: Ravshan Irmatov (Uzbekistan)

28 February 2017	Shanghai SIPG (China)	5–1	(Australia) Western Sydney Wanderers	Shanghai Stadium, Shanghai
19:30 UTC+8	Hulk 2'; Oscar 17'; Shi Ke 25'; Elkeson 27'; Wu Lei 75'	Report	Nichols 20'	Attendance: 28,090; Referee: Ahmed Al-Kaf (Oman)

15 March 2017	FC Seoul (South Korea)	2–3	(Australia) Western Sydney Wanderers	Seoul World Cup Stadium, Seoul
19:30 UTC+9	Yun Il-lok 66', 71'	Report	Scott 24'; Antonis 40' (pen.); Sotirio 63'	Attendance: 4,769; Referee: Ammar Al-Jeneibi (United Arab Emirates)

11 April 2017	Western Sydney Wanderers (Australia)	2–3	(South Korea) FC Seoul	Campbelltown Stadium, Sydney
20:00 UTC+10	Antonis 77'; Scott 90+2'	Report	Lee Seok-hyun 4'; Damjanović 42' (pen.), 71'	Attendance: 5,356; Referee: Nivon Robesh Gamini (Sri Lanka)

26 April 2017	Urawa Red Diamonds (Japan)	6–1	(Australia) Western Sydney Wanderers	Saitama Stadium 2002, Saitama
19:30 UTC+9	Sekine 14'; Ljubijankić 18'; Lee 43'; Rafael Silva 71', 80'; Koroki 90+4'	Report	Kusukami 66'	Attendance: 19,467; Referee: Khamis Al-Marri (Qatar)

10 May 2017	Western Sydney Wanderers (Australia)	3–2	(China) Shanghai SIPG	Campbelltown Stadium, Sydney
20:00 UTC+10	Kusukami 3'; Lustica 6'; Sotirio 89'	Report	Wu Lei 1'; Elkeson 23' (pen.)	Attendance: 5,271; Referee: Turki Al-Khudhayr (Saudi Arabia)

== Statistics ==
=== By competition ===
Western Sydney Wanderers FC in Asian football by competition
Competition	Played	Won	Drawn	Lost	For	Against	Win%
AFC Champions League	26	12	4	10	37	39	46.15
Club World Cup	2	0	0	2	3	5	0.00
Total	28	12	4	12	40	44	42.86

=== By league ===
Western Sydney Wanderers FC in International football by league
League	Played	Won	Drawn	Lost	For	Against	Win%
(Algeria) ALG	1	0	0	1	2	2	0.00
(China) CHN	8	5	0	3	16	12	62.5
(Japan) JPN	8	3	0	5	10	18	37.5
(Mexico) MEX	1	0	0	1	1	3	0.00
(Saudi Arabia) SAU	2	1	1	0	1	0	50.00
(South Korea) KOR	8	3	3	2	11	9	37.5

=== By club ===
Western Sydney Wanderers FC in Asian football by club
Opposition	Played	Won	Drawn	Lost	For	Against	Win%
(Saudi Arabia) Al Hilal	2	1	1	0	1	0	50.00
(Mexico) Cruz Azul	1	0	0	1	1	3	0.00
(Algeria) ES Sétif	1	0	1	0	2	2	0.00
(South Korea) FC Seoul	6	2	3	1	8	6	33.33
(China) Guangzhou Evergrande Taobao	4	2	0	2	6	5	50.00
(China) Guizhou Renhe	2	2	0	0	6	0	100.00
(Japan) Kashima Antlers	2	1	0	1	4	3	50.00
(Japan) Kawasaki Frontale	2	1	0	1	2	2	50.00
(Japan) Sanfrecce Hiroshima	2	1	0	1	3	3	50.00
(China) Shanghai SIPG	2	1	0	1	4	7	50.00
(South Korea) Ulsan Hyundai	2	1	0	1	3	3	50.00
(Japan) Urawa Red Diamonds	2	0	0	2	1	10	0.00

=== By season ===
Western Sydney Wanderers FC in Asian football by season
Season	Competition	Played	Won	Drawn	Lost	For	Against	Win%	Round
2014	AFC Champions League	14	8	2	4	19	10	57.14	Champions
2014	FIFA Club World Cup	2	0	0	2	3	5	0.00	Sixth
2015	AFC Champions League	6	2	2	2	9	7	33.33	Group stage
2017	AFC Champions League	6	2	0	4	10	22	33.33	Group stage

== Honours ==
- AFC Champions League Champions: 2014

== See also ==
- Australian soccer clubs in continental competitions
