= Gwangyang station =

Railway station in South Korea

광양
Gwangyang
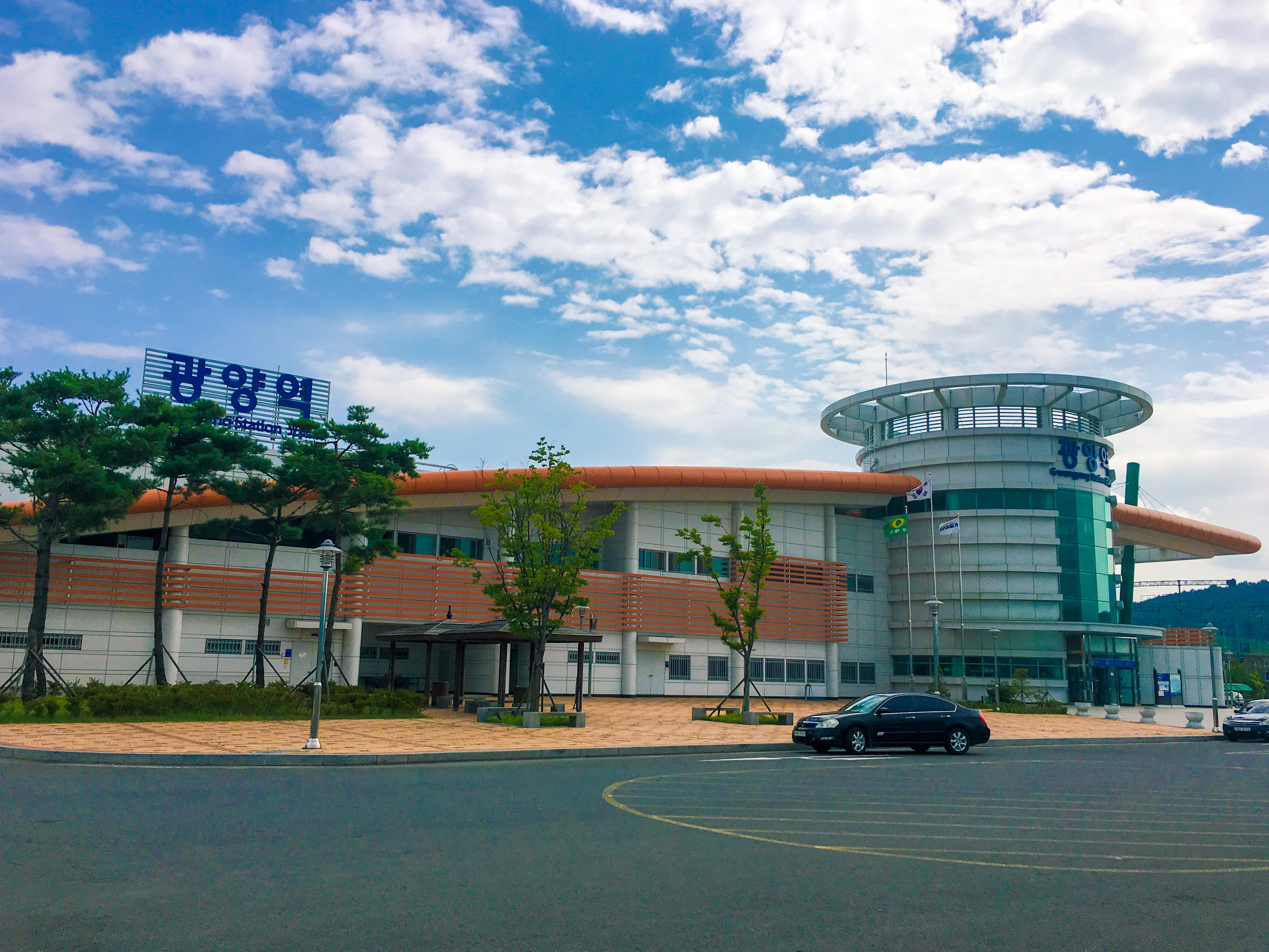

General information
- Location: South Korea
- Coordinates: 34°58′3.94″N 127°35′20.48″E
- Operator: Korail
- Line: Gyeongjeon Line

Construction
- Structure type: Aboveground

Services
Preceding station	Korail	Following station
Suncheon towards Mokpo	Saemaeul-ho Mokpo–Boseong Line	Hadong towards Bujeon
Jinsang towards Bujeon	Mugunghwa-ho Gyeongjeon Line	Suncheon Terminus
Jinsang towards Bujeon	Mugunghwa-ho Mokpo–Boseong Line	Suncheon towards Mokpo
Location
Location within South Korea

Gwangyang Station is a railway station in on the Gyeongjeon Line located in Gwangyang, South Korea. The Mugunghwa-ho train stops eight times each day.
