= Wansa station =

Railway station in South Korea

완사
Wansa
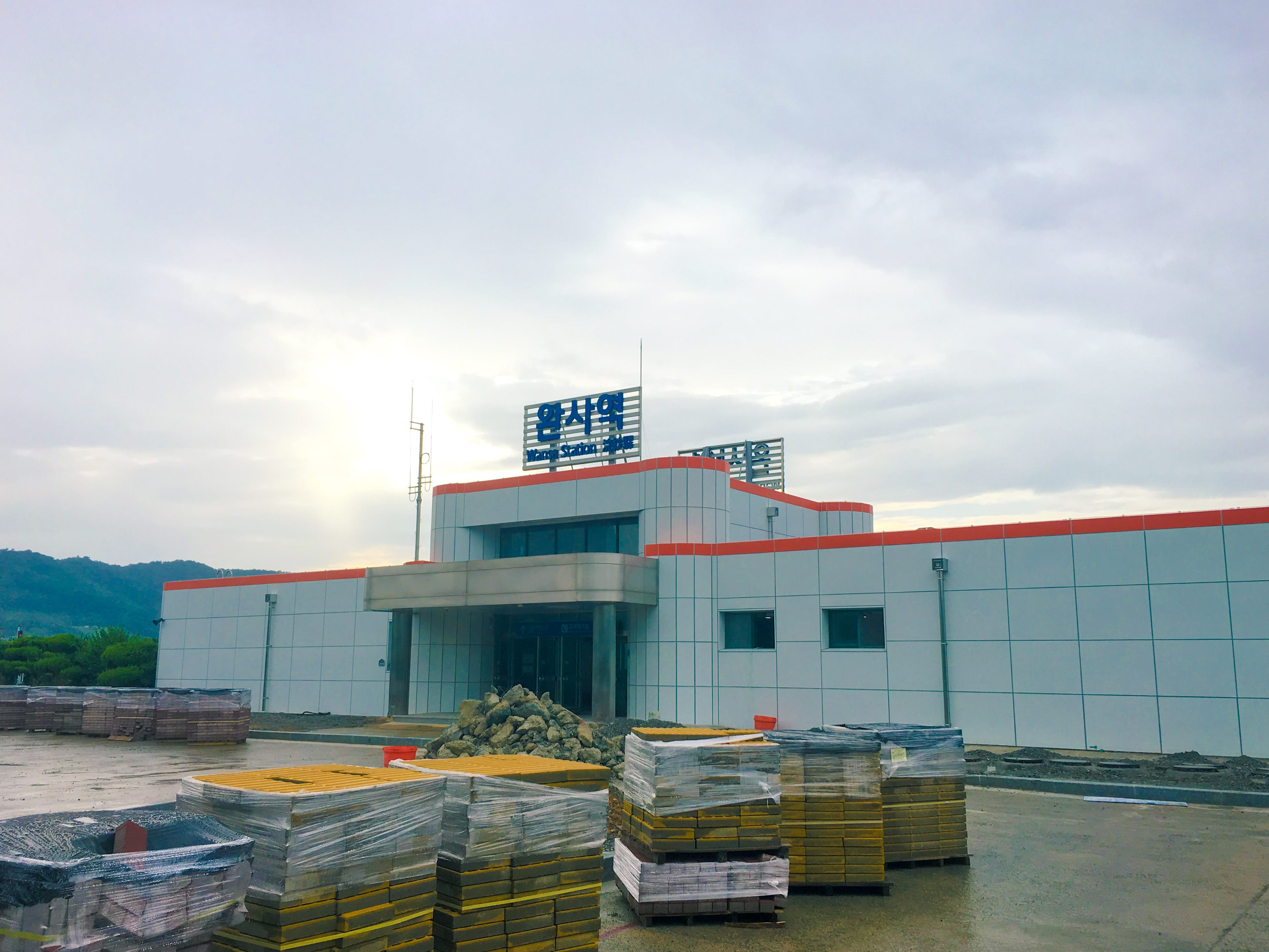

General information
- Location: South Korea
- Coordinates: 35.1341°N 127.9774°E
- Operator: Korail
- Line: Gyeongjeon Line

Construction
- Structure type: Aboveground

Services
Preceding station	Korail	Following station
Jinju towards Bujeon	Mugunghwa-ho Gyeongjeon Line	Bukcheon towards Suncheon
Jinju towards Bujeon	Mugunghwa-ho Mokpo–Boseong Line	Bukcheon towards Mokpo
Location
Location within South Korea

Wansa Station is a railway station on the Gyeongjeon Line in South Korea.

In 1999, it was relocated to its current location due to repair work on the Namgang Dam, and the platform and station were upgraded as part of the Jinju-Gwangyang double-tracking project.
