= Central Coast Mariners FC in international football =

- Club: Central Coast Mariners
- First entry: 2009 AFC Champions League
- Latest entry: 2024–25 AFC Champions League Elite

Titles
- AFC Cup: 1: 2024

Central Coast Mariners Football Club is an Australian professional football club based in Gosford, on the Central Coast of New South Wales. The first Asian football match played by the Mariners was against Pohang Steelers on 11 March 2009. They have since participated in the AFC Champions League on four occasions and the AFC Cup on one occasion, both organised by the Asian Football Confederation. The team won the 2023–24 AFC Cup and has made the knockout stage of Asian competition on one other occasion (2013 AFC Champions League).

Qualification for Asian club competitions is determined by a team's performance in the domestic league, the A-League Men, and domestic cup, the Australia Cup. The winners of the A-League Men Premiership (regular season) have always qualified, with the winners of the A-League Men Championship (finals series), Australia Cup winners and the next-best team(s) in the A-League Men regular season occasionally receiving a place.

John Hutchinson holds the club record for most appearances with 24. Marco Túlio is the club's record goalscorer in Asian football with eight goals. The Mariners' biggest winning margin in Asia is a 9–1 scoreline, this was achieved at home against Stallion Laguna in the 2023–24 AFC Cup.

== History ==
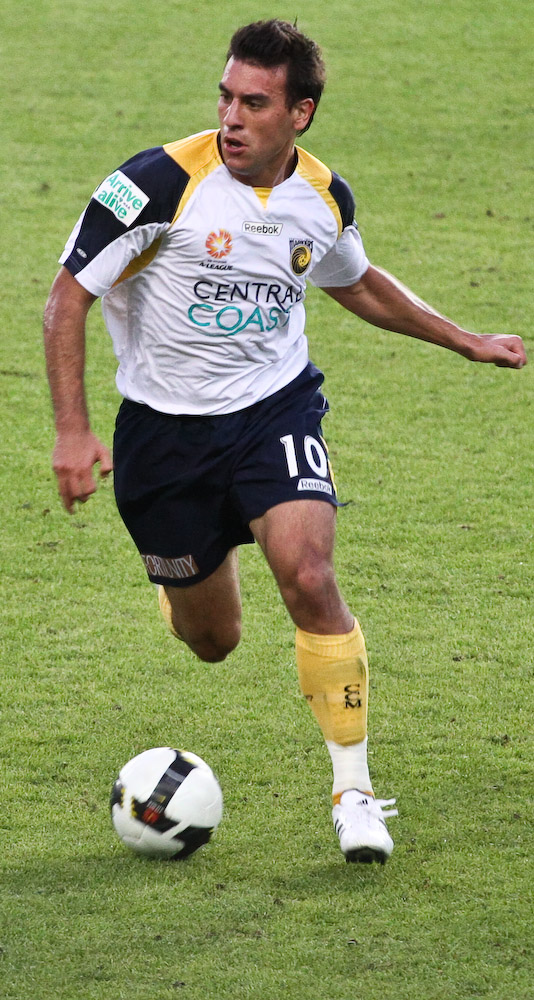
Adrian Caceres was the first Mariners player to score in Asian competition.

=== 2009 AFC Champions League ===
The Mariners qualified for the 2009 AFC Champions League after finishing first in the 2007–08 A-League regular season. They played their first ever match in Asia against K-League side Pohang Steelers, finishing in a scoreless draw at Central Coast Stadium. In the next match, against Tianjin Teda, Adrian Caceres became the club's first ever goalscorer in Asian football when he deflected a shot from Shane Huke into the goal; the match finished in a 2-all draw. After picking up two points from their first two games, the team had a run of four consecutive losses which saw them eliminated in the group stage.

Season	Competition	Round	Opposition	Score
2009	AFC Champions League	Group stage	(South Korea) Pohang Steelers	0–0 (H), 3–2 (A)
2009	AFC Champions League	Group stage	(China) Tianjin Teda	2–2 (A), 0–1 (H)
2009	AFC Champions League	Group stage	(Japan) Kawasaki Frontale	0–5 (H), 2–1 (A)

=== 2012 AFC Champions League ===
Central Coast returned to Asian competition in the 2012 AFC Champions League after finishing second in the 2010–11 A-League. The club drew their first three matches against Tianjin Teda, Nagoya Grampus and Seongnam Ilhwa Chunma, before suffering a 5-goal loss away to Seongnam. In the following match, against Tianjin Teda, the mariners produced their best-ever Champions League result to date, winning 5–1 at home in what was their first ever win in the competition. Needing an away win in their final group game against Nagoya Grampus to progress to the next round, the club suffered a 3–0 loss and were eliminated from the competition.

Season	Competition	Round	Opposition	Score
2012	AFC Champions League	Group stage	(China) Tianjin Teda	0–0 (A), 5–1 (H)
2012	AFC Champions League	Group stage	(Japan) Nagoya Grampus	1–1 (H), 3–0 (A)
2012	AFC Champions League	Group stage	(South Korea) Seongnam Ilhwa Chunma	1–1 (H), 5–0 (A)

=== 2013 AFC Champions League ===
The Mariners were the only team to receive direct qualification to the 2014 AFC Champions League after winning the 2011–12 A-League Premiership. This campaign included a 2–1 win over Guizhou Renhe, as well as an away win against Suwon Bluewings only two days after winning the 2013 A-League Grand Final. A loss to Kashiwa Reysol in the final group game was not enough to prevent the Mariners from qualifying for the round of sixteen for the first time. In the next round, Central Coast came up against Chinese Super League champions Guangzhou Evergrande and lost 5–1 over two legs. Evergrande went on to win the competition.

Season	Competition	Round	Opposition	Score
2013	AFC Champions League	Group stage	(South Korea) Suwon Bluewings	0–0 (H), 0–1 (A)
2013	AFC Champions League	Group stage	(Japan) Kashiwa Reysol	3–1 (A), 0–3 (H)
2013	AFC Champions League	Group stage	(China) Guizhou Renhe	2–1 (H), 2–1 (A)
2013	AFC Champions League	Round of 16	(China) Guangzhou Evergrande	1–2 (H), 3–0 (A)

=== 2014 AFC Champions League ===
The club qualified for the 2014 AFC Champions League after winning the 2013 A-League Grand Final, but were forced to deny rumours that they were considering withdrawing from the competition for financial reasons. A double from Mile Sterjovski gave the club a victory over Sanfrecce Hiroshima at home – the Mariners' first victory against Japanese opposition. The club also defeated Beijing Guoan. A loss in their final match against Sanfrecce eliminated the Mariners from the tournament.

Season	Competition	Round	Opposition	Score
2014	AFC Champions League	Group stage	(South Korea) FC Seoul	2–0 (A), 1–2 (H)
2014	AFC Champions League	Group stage	(Japan) Sanfrecce Hiroshima	2–1 (H), 1–0 (A)
2014	AFC Champions League	Group stage	(China) Beijing Guoan	2–1 (A), 1–0 (H)

=== 2015 AFC Champions League ===
The Mariners participated in the 2015 AFC Champions League after coming third in the 2013–14 A-League. They entered in the qualifying play-off, where they lost at home to Guangzhou R&F, and were therefore eliminated.

Season	Competition	Round	Opposition	Score
2015	AFC Champions League	Qualifying play-off round	(China) Guangzhou R&F	1–3 (H)

=== 2023–24 AFC Cup ===
Central Coast qualified for the 2023–24 AFC Cup after finishing second in the 2022–23 A-League Men regular season.

Season	Competition	Round	Opposition	Score
2023–24	AFC Cup	Group stage	(Malaysia) Terengganu	1–0 (A), 1–1 (H)
2023–24	AFC Cup	Group stage	(Philippines) Stallion Laguna	9–1 (H), 0–3 (A)
2023–24	AFC Cup	Group stage	(Indonesia) Bali United	6–3 (H), 1–2 (A)
2023–24	AFC Cup	Zonal semi-final	(Cambodia) Phnom Penh Crown	4–0 (H)
2023–24	AFC Cup	Zonal final	(Australia) Macarthur	2–3 (A)
2023–24	AFC Cup	Inter-zone semi-final	(India) Odisha	4–0 (H), 0–0 (A)
2023–24	AFC Cup	Inter-zone final	(Kyrgyzstan) Abdysh-Ata Kant	1–1 (A), 3–0 (H)
2023–24	AFC Cup	Final	(Lebanon) Al Ahed	0–1 (A)

=== 2024–25 AFC Champions League Elite ===
The Mariners qualified for the 2024–25 AFC Champions League Elite as Premiers of the 2023–24 A-League Men. The Mariners lost several key players before the competition commenced and were elimiated in the league stage after losing seven of their eight games. The Mariners' sole positive result in the tournament was a 2–2 draw against Shanghai Shenhua, coming from two goals down through goals to Sabit Ngor and Bailey Brandtman. The Mariners' loss to Shandong Taishan was later expunged after the Chinese side withdrew from the competition.

Season	Competition	Round	Opposition	Score
2024–25	AFC Champions League Elite	League stage	(China) Shandong Taishan	~~3–1 (A)~~
2024–25	AFC Champions League Elite	League stage	(Thailand) Buriram United	1–2 (H)
2024–25	AFC Champions League Elite	League stage	(China) Shanghai Port	3–2 (A)
2024–25	AFC Champions League Elite	League stage	(China) Shanghai Shenhua	2–2 (H)
2024–25	AFC Champions League Elite	League stage	(Japan) Vissel Kobe	3–2 (A)
2024–25	AFC Champions League Elite	League stage	(Japan) Yokohama F. Marinos	0–4 (H)
2024–25	AFC Champions League Elite	League stage	(Malaysia) Johor Darul Ta'zim	1–2 (H)
2024–25	AFC Champions League Elite	League stage	(Japan) Kawasaki Frontale	2–0 (A)

== Overall record ==
=== By season ===
Central Coast Mariners FC record in Asian football by season
Season	Pld	W	D	L	GF	GA	GD	Round
2009	6	0	2	4	5	13	−8	Group stage
2012	6	1	3	2	7	11	−4	Group stage
2013	8	2	1	5	6	14	−8	Round of 16
2014	6	2	0	4	4	7	−3	Group stage
2015	1	0	0	1	1	3	−2	Qualifying play-off round
2023–24	13	9	3	1	37	10	+27	Winners
2024–25	7	0	1	6	8	18	–10	League stage
Total	47	14	10	23	67	75	–8	

=== By country ===
Central Coast Mariners record in Asian football by country
Country	League	Pld	W	D	L	GF	GA	GD	Win%
Australia	A-League Men	1	1	0	0	3	2	+1	100%
Cambodia	Cambodian Premier League	1	1	0	0	4	0	+4	100%
China	Chinese Super League	13	3	3	7	18	22	−4	23%
India	Indian Super League	2	1	1	0	4	0	+4	50%
Indonesia	Liga 1	2	2	0	0	8	4	+4	100%
Japan	J1 League	11	1	1	9	7	28	−21	9%
Kyrgyzstan	Kyrgyz Premier League	2	1	1	0	4	1	+3	50%
Lebanon	Lebanese Premier League	1	1	0	0	1	0	+1	100%
Malaysia	Malaysia Super League	3	0	1	2	2	4	–2	0%
Philippines	Philippines Football League	2	2	0	0	12	1	+11	100%
South Korea	K League	8	1	3	4	4	12	−8	12.5%
Thailand	Thai League 1	1	0	0	1	1	2	–1	0%

== See also ==
- Australian soccer clubs in continental competitions
