= Bukcheon station =

Railway station in South Korea

북천
Bukcheon
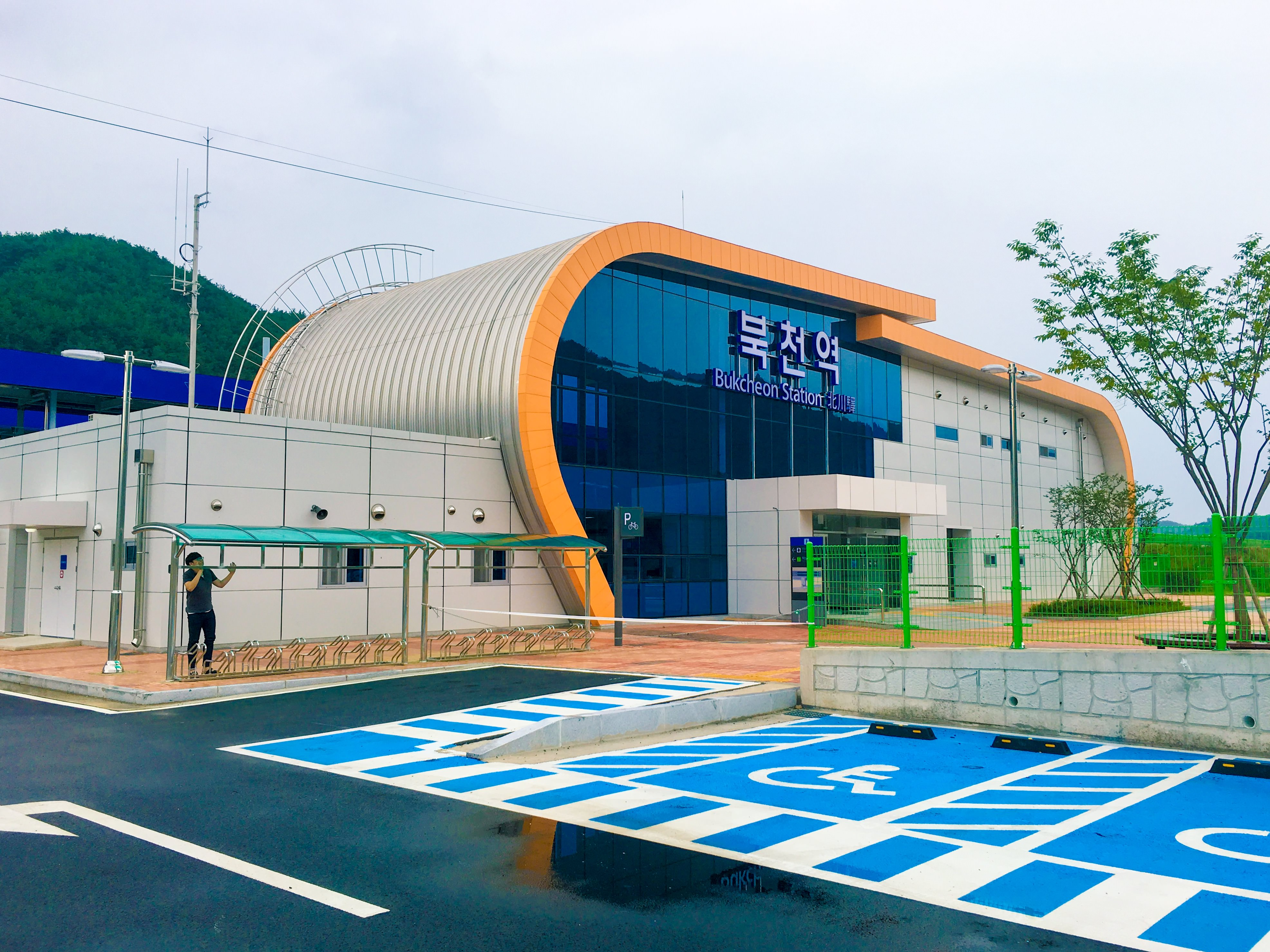

General information
- Location: South Korea
- Coordinates: 35°6′42″N 127°53′1″E
- Operator: Korail
- Line: Gyeongjeon Line

Construction
- Structure type: Aboveground

Services
Preceding station	Korail	Following station
Wansa towards Bujeon	Mugunghwa-ho Gyeongjeon Line	Hoengcheon towards Suncheon
Wansa towards Bujeon	Mugunghwa-ho Mokpo–Boseong Line	Hoengcheon towards Mokpo
Location
Location within South Korea

Bukcheon Station is a railway station in South Korea. It is located on the Gyeongjeon Line.
