= Jinsang station =

Automated railway station in South Korea

진상
Jinsang
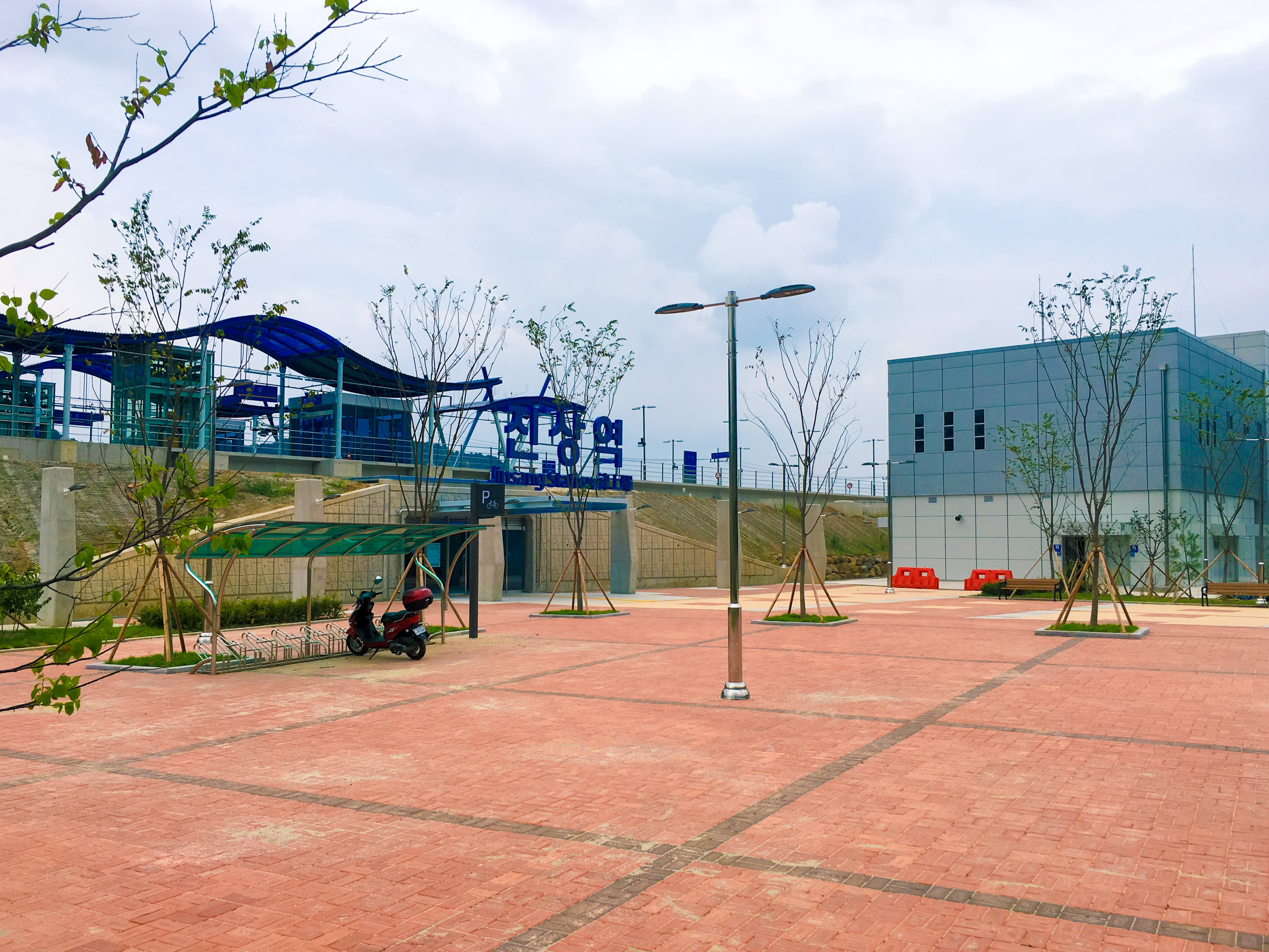

General information
- Location: South Korea
- Coordinates: 35.0165°N 127.7198°E
- Operator: Korail
- Line: Gyeongjeon Line

Construction
- Structure type: Aboveground

Services
Preceding station	Korail	Following station
Hadong towards Bujeon	Mugunghwa-ho Gyeongjeon Line	Gwangyang towards Suncheon
Hadong towards Bujeon	Mugunghwa-ho Mokpo–Boseong Line	Gwangyang towards Mokpo
Location
Location within South Korea

Jinsang Station is an automated railway station in South Korea on the Gyeongjeon Line. The station building was rebuilt and the old building was leased to a restaurant in 2009.
