= Goryak-dong =

- Interactive map of Goryak-dong
- Country: South Korea
- Website: gwangyang.go.kr

Korean name
- Hangul: 골약동
- Hanja: 骨若洞
- RR: Goryak-dong
- MR: Koryak-tong

Goryak-dong (Korean: 골약동) is a ward of Gwangyang, North Jeolla Province, South Korea.

Administrative neighborhood Goryak-dong holds five legal-status neighborhoods Hwanggeum-dong, Hwanggil-dong, Doi-dong, Seonghwang-dong, and Junggun-dong.
