= Gwangyang =

City in Jeonnam-Gwangju, South Korea

Coordinates: 34°56′N 127°41′E

- Municipal City
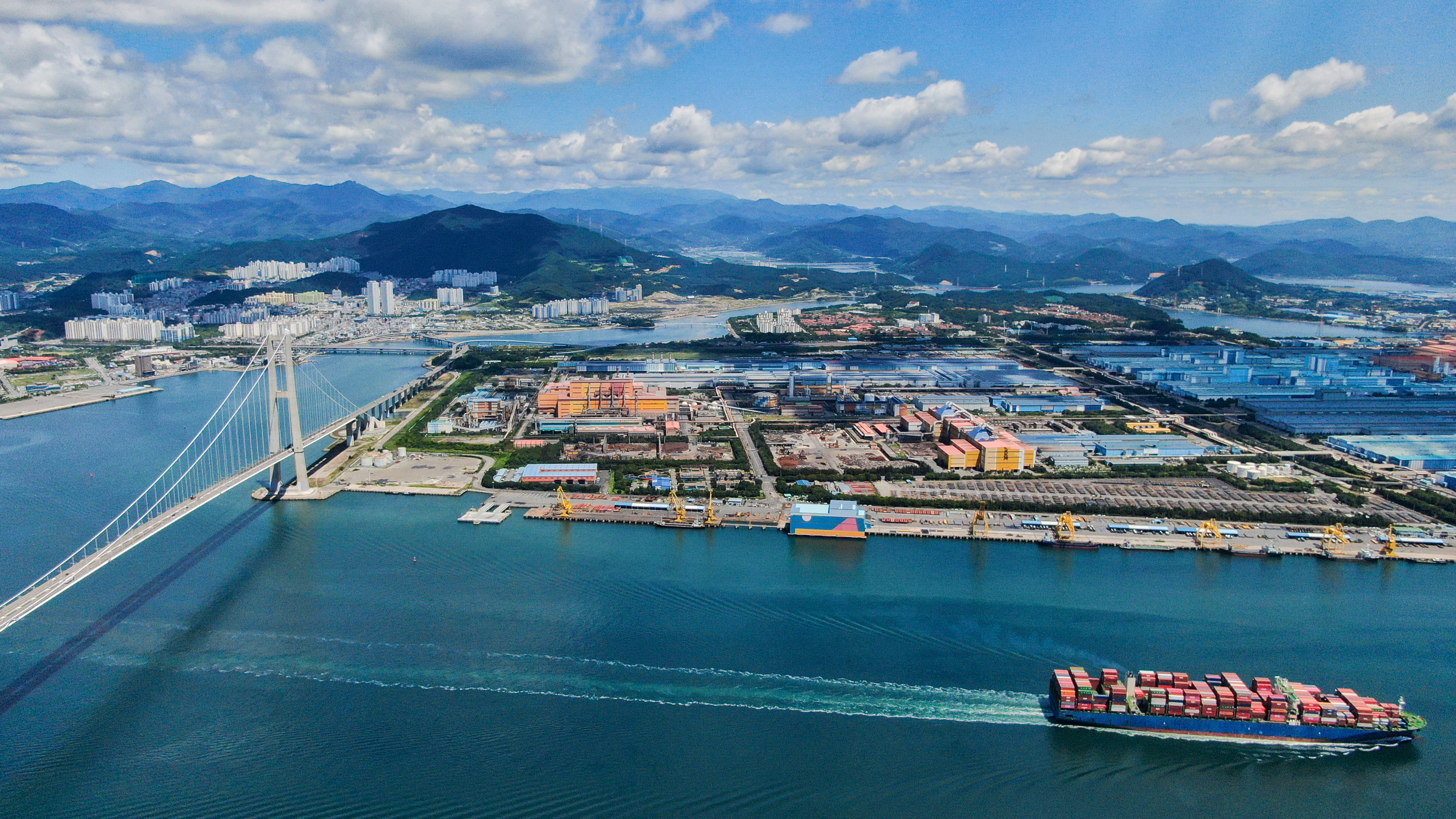
- A POSCO shipping terminal in front, with the city to the left (2021)

- Flag Emblem of Gwangyang

- Location in South Korea
- Country: South Korea
- Region: Honam
- Provincial-level city: Jeonnam-Gwangju
- Administrative divisions: 1 eup, 6 myeon, 5 dong

Government
  - Mayor: Jeong In-hwa (정인화)

Area
  - Total: 446.08 km^{2} (172.23 sq mi)

Population (September 2024)
  - Total: 154,266
  - Density: 345.83/km^{2} (895.68/sq mi)
  - Dialect: Jeolla
- Time zone: UTC+9 (Korea Standard Time)
- Area code: +82-61

Korean name
- Hangul: 광양시
- Hanja: 光陽市
- RR: Gwangyang-si
- MR: Kwangyang-si

Gwangyang (Korean: 광양; Korean pronunciation: [kwaŋ.jaŋ]) is a city in Jeonnam-Gwangju, South Korea. Gwangyang is the home of POSCO's Gwangyang Steel Works, the largest facility of its kind in the world. The city is also home to K League Classic football side Jeonnam Dragons.

Gwangyang is at the centre of development for the Gwangyang Bay Area Free Economic Zone (GFEZ), the third-largest among the six free economic zones of South Korea, covering 92.7 square kilometers. The Free Economic Zone focus on port container handling, steel production, shipbuilding as well as leisure facilities. The area has become a mega business hub, exploiting its accessibility to China.

Famous people from Gwangyang include National Intelligence Service head Kim Seung-kew. To the north of the city is the county of Gurye, to the east along the Seomjin River is the county of Hadong in Gyeongsangnam-do, and to the south is the Gwangyang Bay. Mountains in the city include Baegunsan (백운산, 1,217m), to the south is Gayasan (가야산, 497m) and Gubonghwasan (구봉화산, 473m). Baegunsan is the second-highest mountain in Jeonnam-Gwangju with the exception of Jirisan (지리산, 1,915 m).

The average yearly temperature is 13.7 °C (56.7 °F), the average in January is 0.1 °C (32.2 °F), and the average in July is 27.8 °C (82.0 °F). The average yearly precipitation is 1,296 mm (51.02 in)

As of October 14, 2007, plans are being set up and a referendum is being planned for a merging of the cities of Yeosu, Suncheon and Gwangyang into a new metropolitan city, taking advantage of the Gwangyang Bay Free Economic Zone, Yeosu's Expo 2012 bid and port facilities, Suncheon's educational institutes and Gwangyang's POSCO plant.

== Symbols ==
- Tree : Gorosoe
- Bird : Sea gull
- Flower : Camellia

== Gwangyang Steel Works ==
The Steel Works in Gwangyang is POSCO's second mill in the country after the mill in Pohang. The mill boasts having the largest steel plant in the world, the most modern technology, and the best facilities for steel manufacturing. It presently produces coil used for making bridges, iron structures, cars, refrigerators, and more. Its production capacity averages about 18 million tons per year. This plant is also a tourist destination for many people, attracting more than 300,000 people from around the globe.

== Location ==
Gwangyang is a strategically important city situated in the southern center of the Korean peninsula. For these geopolitical reasons, Gwangyang is a city which functions as an axis for the balanced development of the country covering Jeonnam-Gwangju area with western parts of Mokpo and Muan.

== Places of interest ==
Gwangyang is home to many unique natural and cultural sites as well as many different festivals during the four seasons. Points of interest include:

- The Baegun mountains
- Maehwa Village
- Yudang Park
- The Natural Resort Park
- Gwangyang Cultural Center

The festivals include:

- The Baegun Mountain Medicinal Water Festival
- The Maehwa Culture Festival
- The Jeoneo Fish Festival
Gallery, Gwangyang

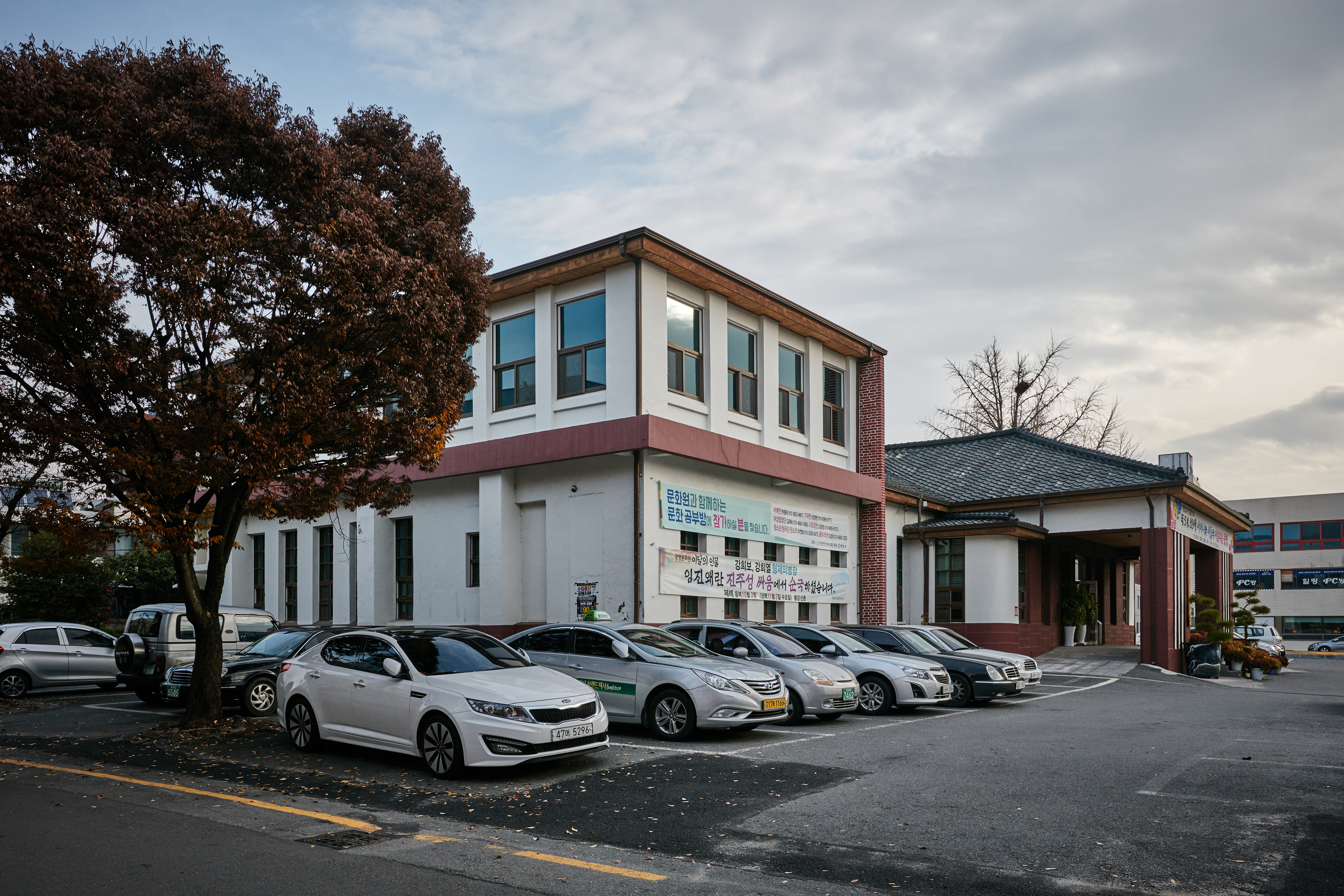
Gwangyang Cultural Center

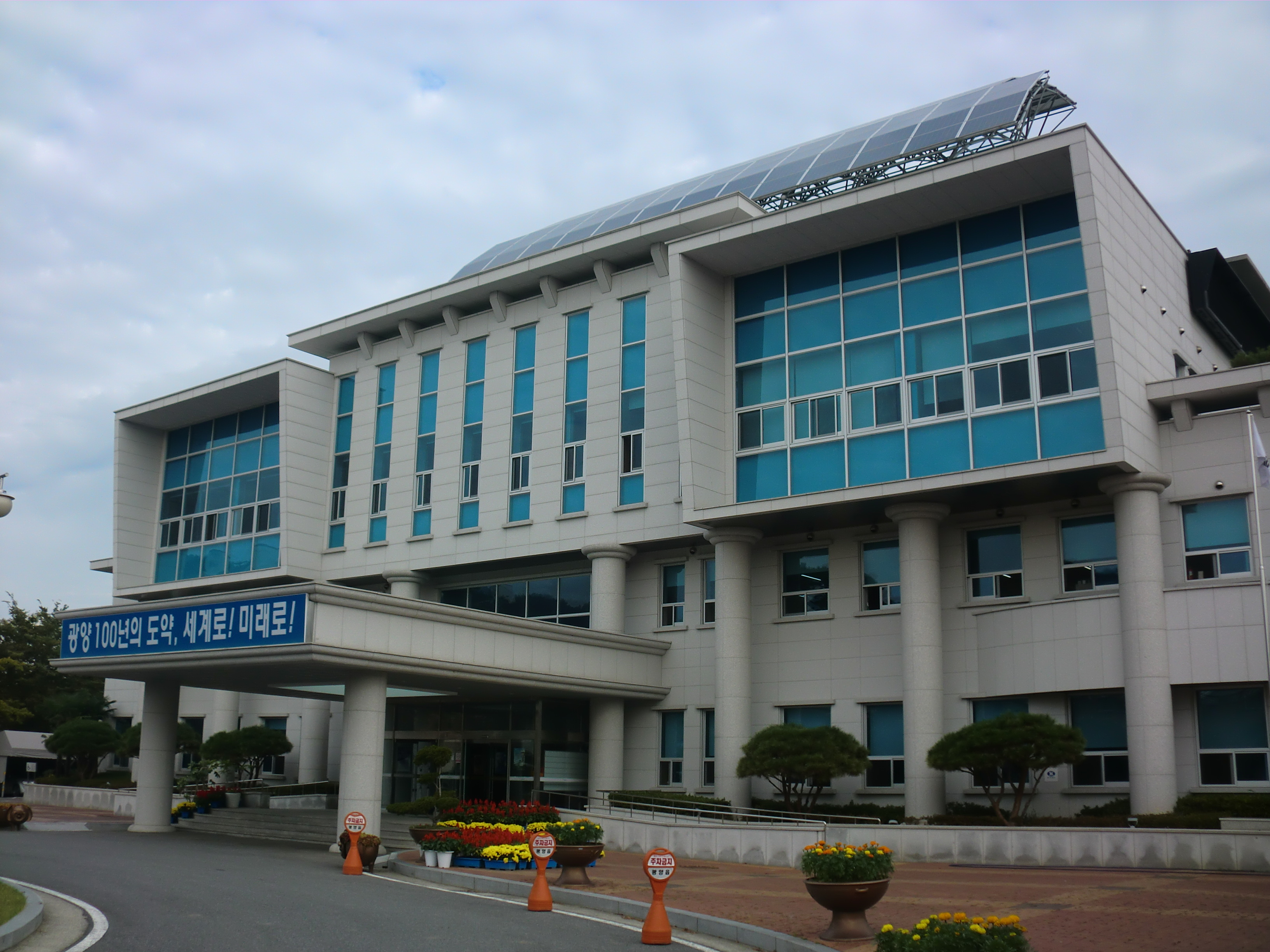
Gwangyang-eup office

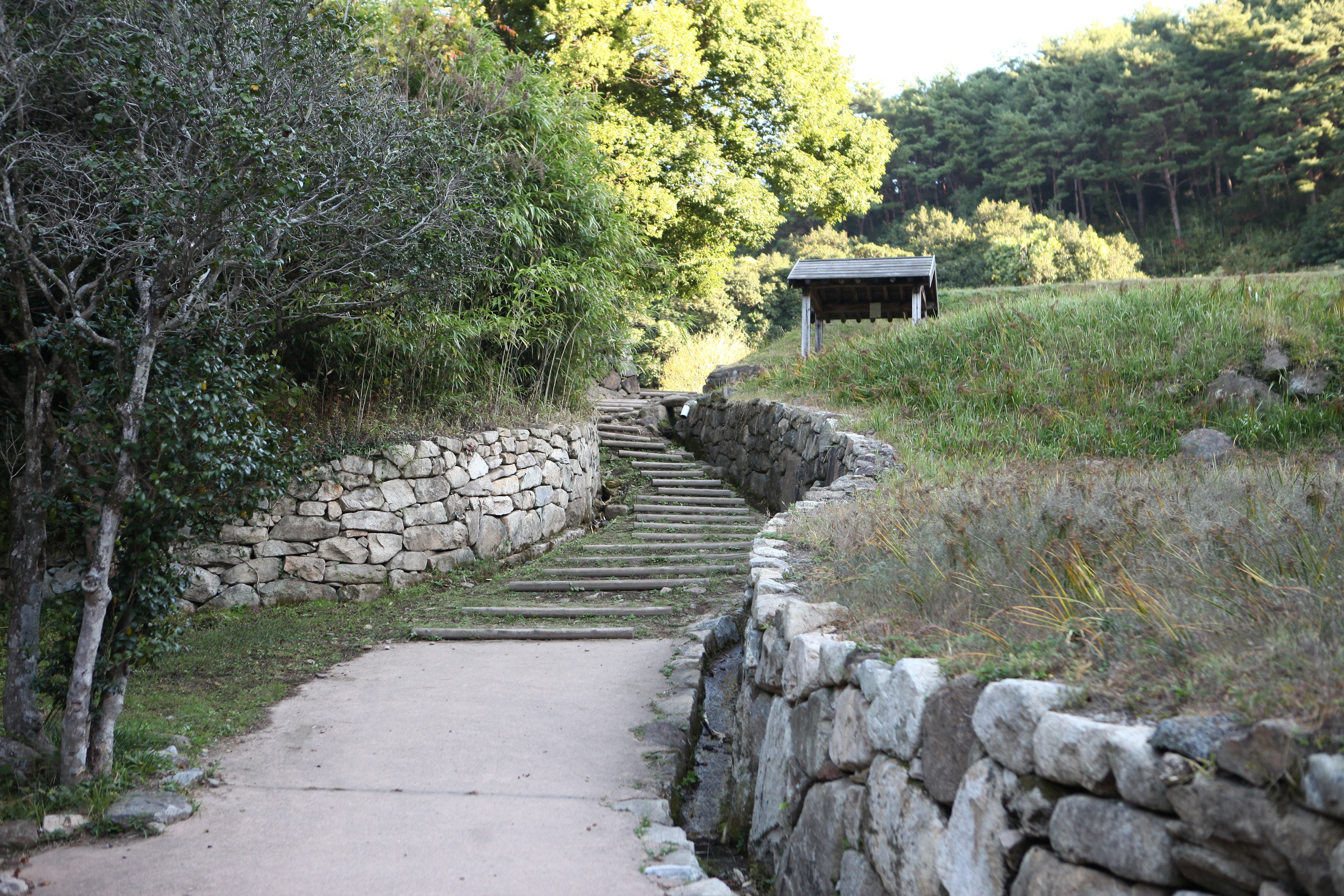
Okryongsa Camellia Forest

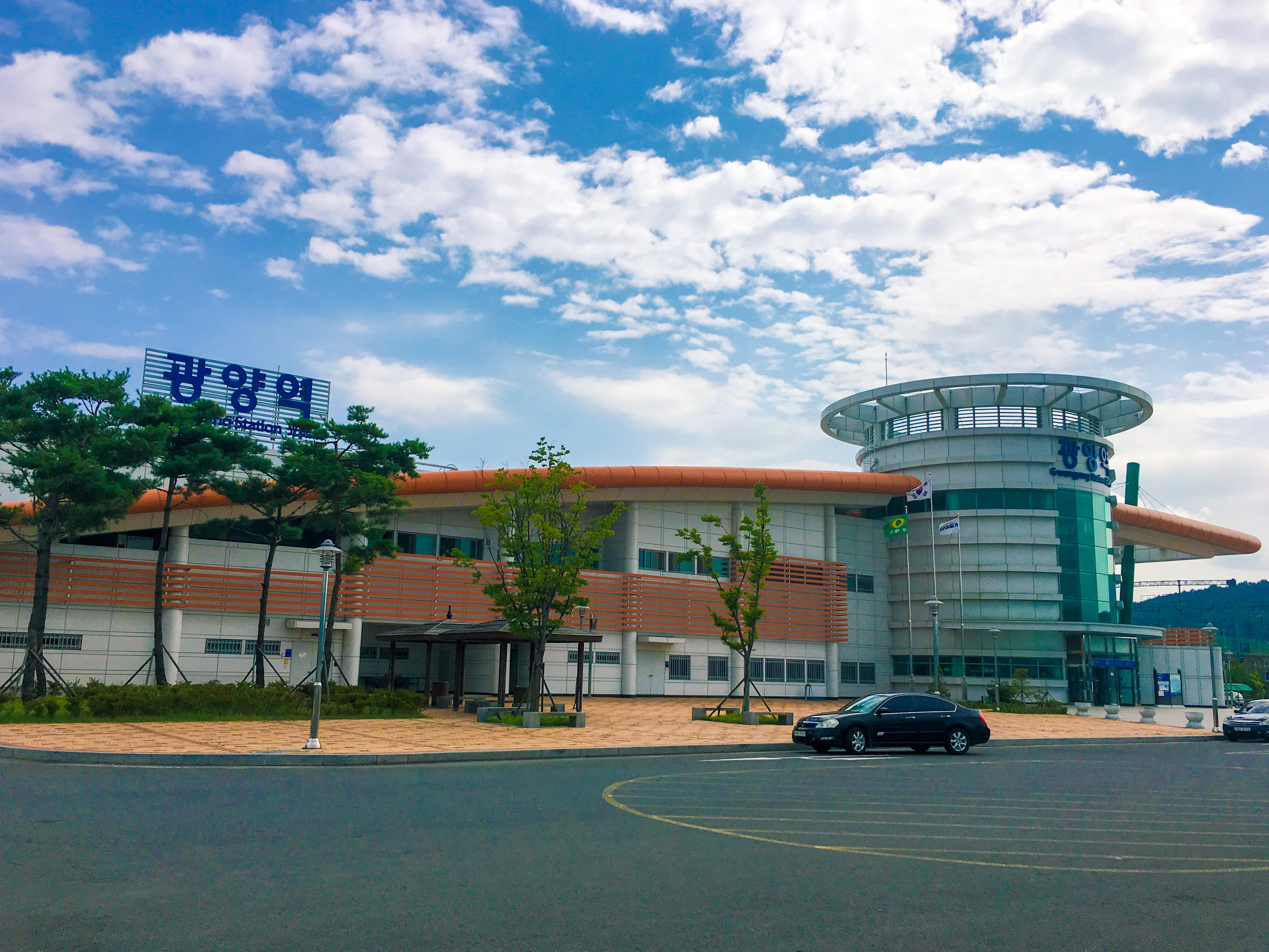
Gwangyang Station

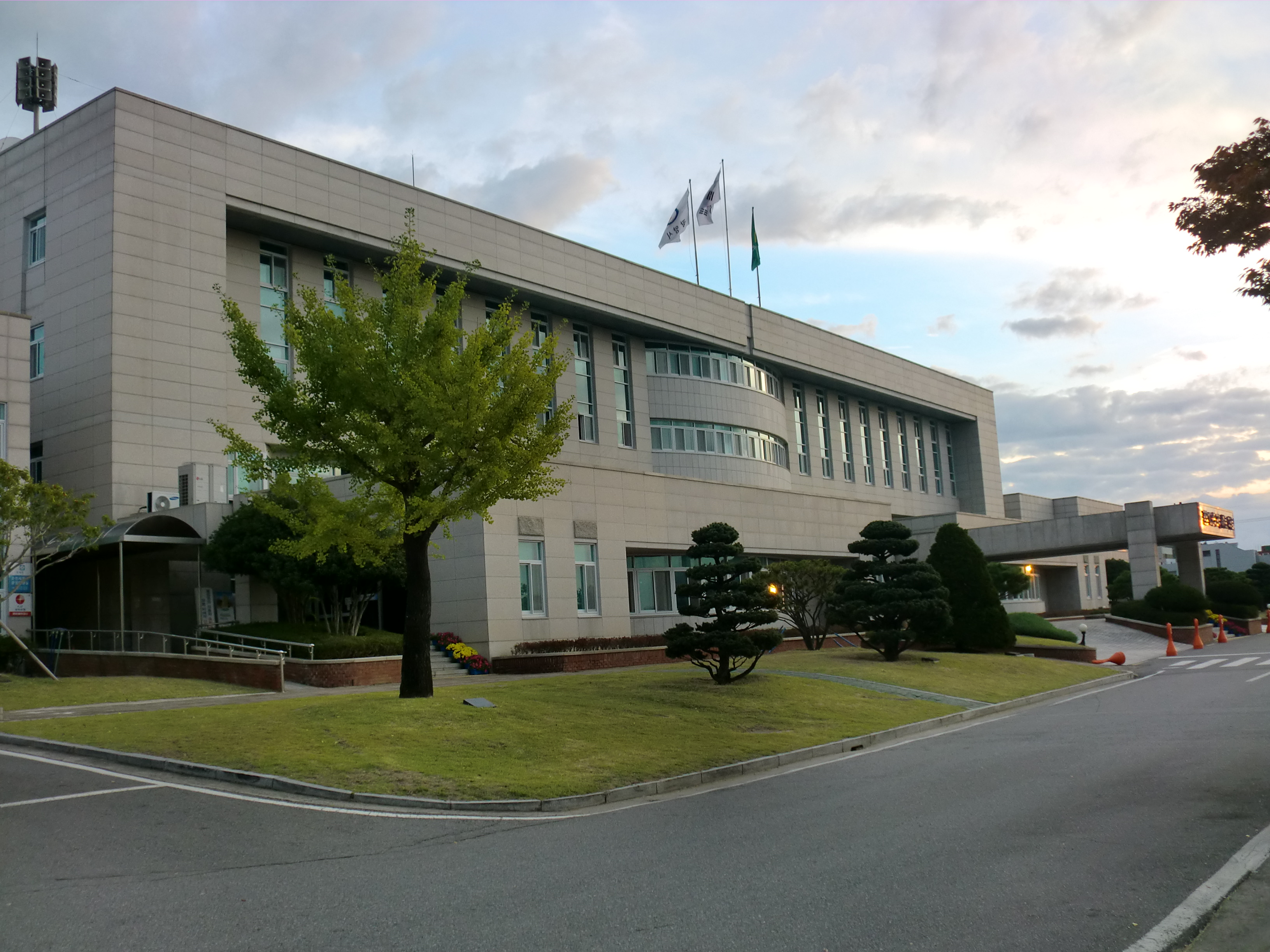
Gwangyang City Hall

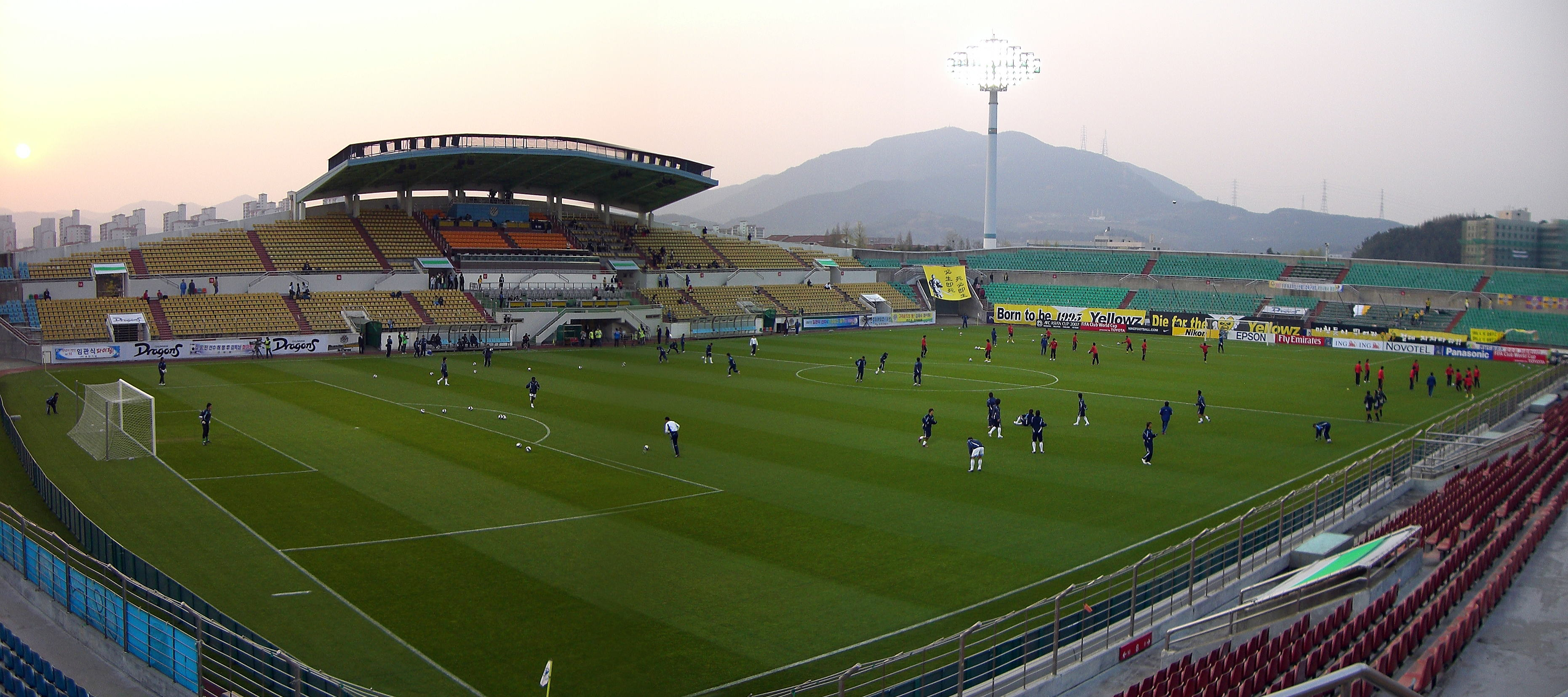
Gwangyang Stadium

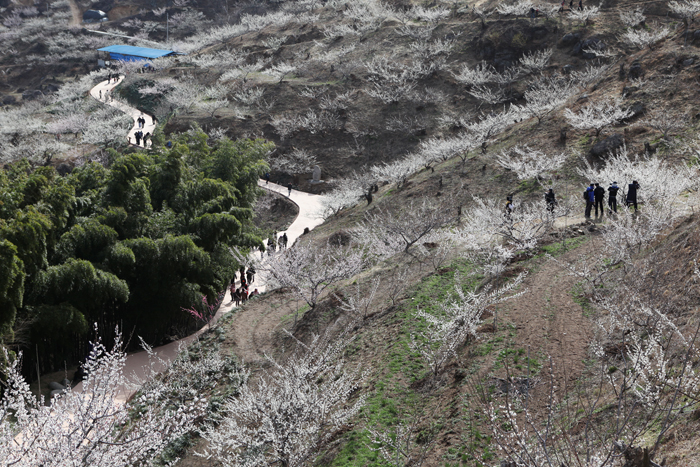
The Maehwa Culture Festival

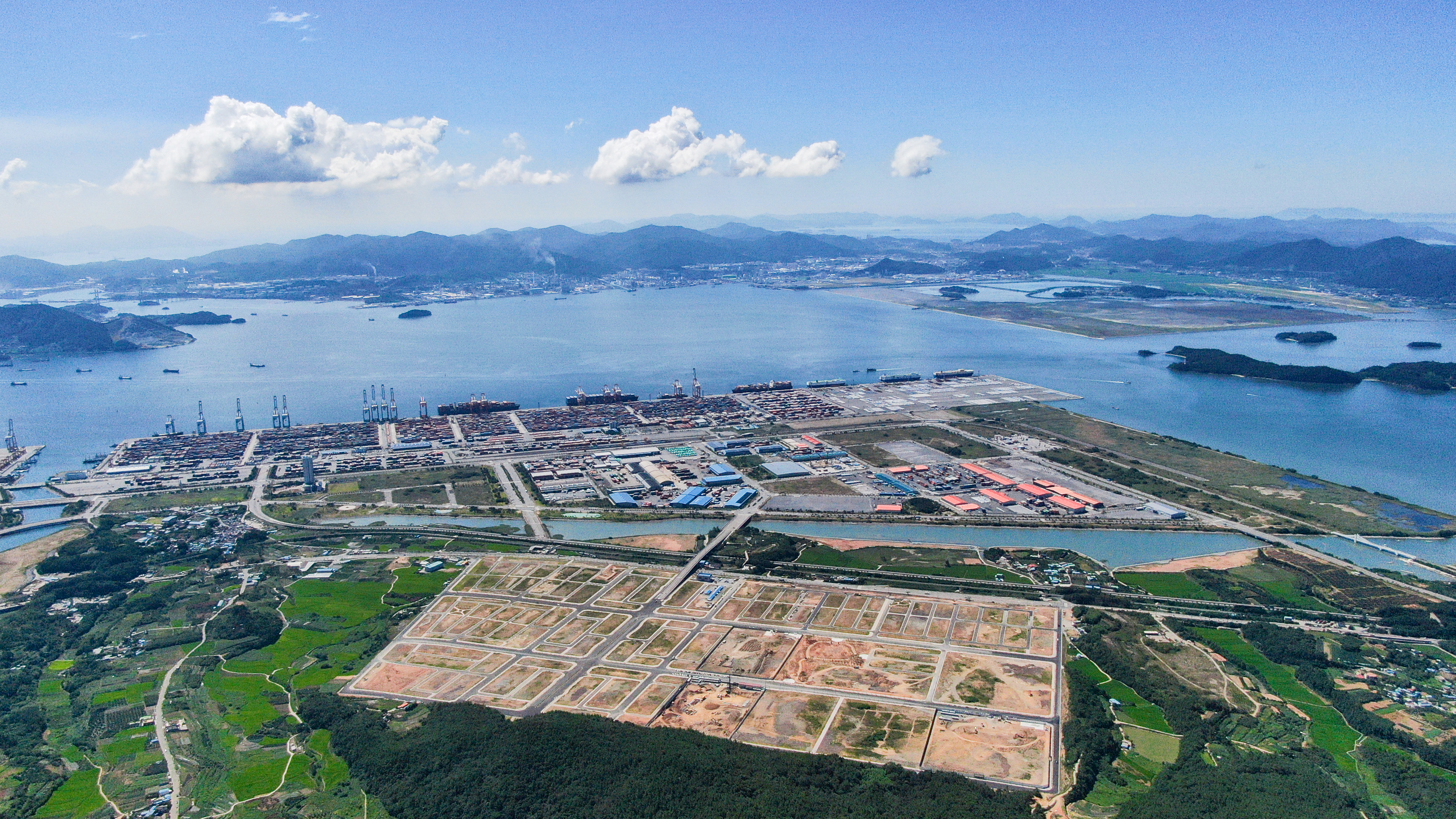

== Festival ==
Gwangyang is famous for its beautiful apricot trees. In Korean, the ume flower is called maehwa (매화) and it has been honored for its early blooming. Because of its characteristic, the Gwangyang Maehwa Festival is the earliest opened festival in the whole Jeonnam-Gwangju area.

Other festivals in Gwangyang are the Baegunsan Mountain Gorosoe Festival, Seomjingang Culture Festival and the Gwangyang Sutbulgui Festival.

== International relations ==
=== Twin towns – Sister cities ===
Gwangyang is twinned with:

Songpa District, Seoul; Pohang, North Gyeongsang Province; Hadong, South Gyeongsang Province; Cagayan de Oro, Philippines	Linz, Austria; Dalian, China; Shenzhen, China; Chengdu, China; Astrakhan, Russia

== See also ==
- Hwanggeum-dong, Gwangyang
- List of cities in South Korea
