= National Route 14 (South Korea) =

Road in South Korea

National Route 14
- 국도 제14호선

Route information
- Length: 315.9 km (196.3 mi)
- Existed: 31 August 1971–present

Major junctions
- East end: Geoje, South Gyeongsang Province
- West end: Pohang, North Gyeongsang Province

Location
- Country: South Korea

Highway system
- Highway systems of South Korea; Expressways; National; Local
| ← National Route 13 | → National Route 15 |

National Route 14 (Korean: 국도 제14호선; RR: gukdo je14hoseon) is a national highway in South Korea connecting Geoje to Pohang. It was established on 31 August 1971.

== History ==
- August 31, 1971: The Geoje–Ulsan line was designated as National Route 14 under the General National Highway Route Designation Decree.
- November 30, 1972: Due to route improvement, road zone changed from 750m section in Songhak-dong ~ Dongui-dong, Goseong-eup, Goseong-gun, and 1.63 km section in Yongjeon-ri ~ Sodap-ri, Changwon-myeon, Changwon-gun to 1.43km
- July 4, 1975: A 510 m section from Seoksan-ri to Cheonggang-ri, Gijang-myeon, Yangsan-gun, was opened, and the existing 520 m section was abolished.
- October 2, 1980: Total 2.093 km section from Icheon-ri, Ilgwang-myeon, Yangsan-gun ~ Dongcheon-ri, Cheongnyangmyeon, Ulju-gun opened, existing 2.356 km section abolished
- March 14, 1981: Starting point extended from 'Jangseungpo-eup, Geoje-gun, Gyeongsangnam-do' to 'Dongbu-myeon, Geoje-gun, Gyeongsangnam-do'.
- May 12, 1981: 26.361 km section from Dapo-ri, Dongbu-myeon, Geoje-gun ~ Jangseungpo-ri, Geoje-eup upgraded to national highway opened
- May 30, 1981: Road zone changed to the modified 27 km section according to the amendment of Presidential Decree No. 10247 General National Highway Route Designation Decree
- August 5, 1981: 7.328 km section from city boundary at Bansong-dong, Dongnae-gu, Busan Direct Control City ~ Gijang-myeon, Yangsan-gun, Gyeongsangnam-do upgraded to national highway opened, existing designated 6.53 km section from city boundary at Songjeong-dong, Haeundae-gu, Busan Direct Control City ~ Gijang-myeon, Yangsan-gun abolished
- August 12, 1981: Road zone changed to the modified 18 km section according to the amendment of Presidential Decree No. 10371 General National Highway Route Designation Decree
- September 2, 1981: Existing nationally designated 277m section in Seolchang-ri, Jinyeong-eup, Gimhae-gun abolished
- May 13, 1986: Starting point extended from 'Dongbu-myeon, Geoje-gun, Gyeongsangnam-do' to 'Nambu-myeon, Geoje-gun, Gyeongsangnam-do'.
- March 11, 1989: Old road sites in Myeongye-ri, Jangan-myeon, Icheon-ri, Ilgwang-myeon, and Samseong-ri area of Yangsan-gun abolished
- September 5, 1989: Old road sites in Seolchang-ri and Jinyeong-ri, Jinyeong-myeon, Gimhae-si, and Seolchang-ri, Yongjam-ri, and Bongsan-ri, Dong-myeon, Uichang-gun area abolished
- July 1, 1995: 16.42 km section from Bansong-dong, Haeundae-gu, Busan Metropolitan City ~ Giryong-ri, Gijang-eup, Gijang-gun opened
- July 1, 1996: Starting point changed from 'Nambu-myeon, Geoje-gun, Gyeongsangnam-do' to 'Nambu-myeon, Geoje-si, Gyeongsangnam-do', end point extended from 'Ulsan-si, Gyeongsangnam-do' to 'Pohang-si, Gyeongsangbuk-do'. Accordingly became the 'Geoje ~ Pohang Line'.
- December 27, 1997: Jwacheon ~ Ulsan Road (Giryong-ri, Jangan-eup, Gijang-gun, Busan Metropolitan City ~ Gaegok-ri, Cheongnyangmyeon, Ulju-gun, Ulsan Metropolitan City) 17.12 km section opened, existing 17.52 km section abolished
- November 18, 1998: Sinhyeon ~ Sadeung Road (Suwol-ri ~ Oryang-ri, Sinhyeon-eup, Geoje-si) 16.14 km section expansion opening
- April 22, 1999: Singeoje Bridge (Oryang-ri, Sadeung-myeon, Geoje-si ~ Wonpyeong-ri, Yongnam-myeon, Tongyeong-si) 3.86 km section of Sadeung ~ Chungmu Road temporarily opened
- February 24, 2000: 19.0 km section from Toe-rae-ri ~ Buram-dong, Hallim-myeon, Gimhae-si, Gyeongsangnam-do designated as automobile-only road
- July 20, 2000: Sadeung ~ Chungmu Road (Oryang-ri, Sadeung-myeon, Geoje-si ~ Mujeon-dong, Tongyeong-si) 9.3 km section expansion opening and existing section abolished
- September 3, 2005: Gimhae-si National Highway Alternative Bypass Road (Toe-rae ~ Nongso Road, Deokam-ri ~ Nongso-ri, Juchon-myeon, Gimhae-si) 5.0 km section opened
- October 13, 2005: Daesin 1,2 District dangerous road (Dusan-ri, Beomseo-eup, Ulju-gun) 460m section improvement opening, existing 200m section abolished
- October 31, 2005: 6.182 km section from Duwang-dong, Nam-gu, Ulsan Metropolitan City ~ Yul-ri, Cheongnyangmyeon, Ulju-gun designated as automobile-only road, 11.02 km section from Aju-dong ~ Jangpyeong-ri, Sinhyeon-eup, Geoje-si designated as automobile-only road
- December 29, 2006: Duwang ~ Mugeo Road (Duwang-dong, Nam-gu, Ulsan Metropolitan City ~ Yul-ri, Cheongnyangmyeon, Ulju-gun) 6.18 km section newly opened
- December 26, 2007: Gimhae-si National Highway Alternative Bypass Road (Toe-rae ~ Nongso Road, Toe-rae-ri, Hallim-myeon ~ Nongso-ri, Juchon-myeon, Gimhae-si) 10.5 km section expansion opening, existing 6.5 km section from Toe-rae-ri ~ Sincheon-ri, Hallim-myeon, Gimhae-si abolished
- May 31, 2010: 8.45 km section from Oseo-ri, Jinjeon-myeon ~ Ingok-ri, Jindong-myeon, Masan-si designated as automobile-only road
- December 13, 2010: Geoje-si National Highway Alternative Bypass Road (Aju-dong ~ Sangdong-dong, Geoje-si) 4.92 km section temporarily opened, Geoje-si National Highway Alternative Bypass Road (Sangdong-dong ~ Jangpyeong-dong, Geoje-si) 6.41 km section temporarily opened
- December 28, 2010: Jindong Bypass Road (Bonggok-ri ~ Imgok-ri, Jinjeon-myeon, Masan Happo-gu, Changwon-si 1.09 km section and Oseo-ri, Jinjeon-myeon ~ Ingok-ri, Jindong-myeon, Masan Happo-gu, Changwon-si 9.18 km section) expansion opening and existing Oseo-ri ~ Imgok-ri, Jinjeon-myeon, Masan Happo-gu, Changwon-si 1.6 km section and Geungok-ri, Jinjeon-myeon ~ Ingok-ri, Jindong-myeon, Masan Happo-gu, Changwon-si 6.75 km section abolished
- February 17, 2012: Dongjeong-ri ~ Usan-dong, Jindong-myeon, Masan Happo-gu, Changwon-si 3.5 km section temporarily opened
- February 27, 2012: 8.14 km section from Deoksan-ri, Dong-eup, Uichang-gu, Changwon-si ~ Jinyeong-ri, Jinyeong-eup, Gimhae-si designated as automobile-only road
- March 27, 2012: Changwon ~ Gimhae Dong-eup Bypass Road (Namsan Intersection ~ Deoksan Bridge, Deoksan-ri, Dong-eup, Uichang-gu, Changwon-si) 830m section temporarily opened
- November 30, 2012: Dongjeong-ri ~ Usan-dong, Jindong-myeon, Masan Happo-gu, Changwon-si 6.56 km section expansion opening, existing Hyeon-dong ~ Usan-dong, Masan Happo-gu, Changwon-si 1.05 km section abolished
- May 3, 2013: Changwon ~ Gimhae Dong-eup Bypass Road (Namsan Intersection ~ Deokcheon 2nd Bridge, Yongjam-ri, Deoksan-ri, Dong-eup, Uichang-gu, Changwon-si) 800m section expansion opening
- July 13, 2013: Geoje-si National Highway Alternative Bypass Road (Aju-dong ~ Sangdong-dong, Geoje-si) 4.92 km section expansion opening
- December 26, 2013: Changwon ~ Gimhae Dong-eup Bypass Road (Dogye Three-way Intersection, Dogye-dong, Uichang-gu, Changwon-si ~ Jinyeong Intersection, Jinyeong-ri, Jinyeong-eup, Gimhae-si) 11.14 km section expansion opening
- February 27, 2014: Namsan Intersection ~ Dong-eup Intersection section opened.
- April 7, 2014: Due to Dong-eup Bypass Road opening, existing 7.4 km section from Deoksan-ri, Dong-eup, Uichang-gu, Changwon-si ~ Jinyeong-ri, Jinyeong-eup, Gimhae-si abolished
- July 28, 2014: Seongnae Village Intersection (Sadeung-ri, Sadeung-myeon, Geoje-si) grade separation improvement opening
- March 31, 2015: Geoje-si National Highway Alternative Bypass Road Sangdong ~ Sinhyeon section (Mundong-dong ~ Jangpyeong-dong, Geoje-si) 6.41 km section expansion opening, existing Songjeong-ri ~ Yeonsa-ri, Yeoncho-myeon, Geoje-si 5.6 km section abolished
- July 21, 2016: Due to Donghae Expressway construction, Dusan-ri, Beomseo-eup, Ulju-gun, Ulsan Metropolitan City 920m section relocation opening, existing 840m section abolished
- August 9, 2016: 7.29 km section from Jinyeong-ri, Jinyeong-eup ~ Toe-rae-ri, Hallim-myeon, Gimhae-si designated as automobile-only road
- December 28, 2016: Geoje-si National Highway Alternative Bypass Road Irun ~ Aju section (Ongnim-ri, Irun-myeon ~ Aju-dong, Geoje-si) 3.83 km section expansion opening, existing Ayang-dong ~ Ongnim-ri, Irun-myeon, Geoje-si 4.6 km section abolished
- April 10, 2017: Dusan-ri, Beomseo-eup, Ulju-gun 250m section opened and existing 270m section abolished

== Main stopovers ==
South Gyeongsang Province

- Geoje - Tongyeong - Goseong County - Changwon - Gimhae

Busan

- Gangseo District (Jukdong-dong)

South Gyeongsang Province

- Gimhae (Buwon-dong ・Samjeong-dong)

Busan

- Gangseo District (Sikman-dong)

South Gyeongsang Province

- Gimhae (Bulam-dong)

Busan

- Gangseo District - Buk District - Dongnae District - Geumjeong District - Haeundae District - Gijang County

Ulsan

- Ulju County - Nam District - Ulju County - Nam District - Jung District - Ulju County

North Gyeongsang Province

- Gyeongju - Pohang

== Major intersections ==
- (■): Motorway

IS: Intersection, IC: Interchange

=== South Gyeongsang Province ===
| Name (Note: Intersection and interchange are also included, as well as buildings and facilities in the surrounding area) | Hangul name | Connection | Location | | Note |
|---|---|---|---|---|---|
| Jeogu IS | 저구사거리 | Prefectural Route 1018 (Geojenamseo-ro); Nambuhaean-ro | Geoje City | Nambu-myeon | Terminus |
| Dapo IS | 다포삼거리 | Prefectural Route 1018 (Geojenamseo-ro) | Geoje City | Nambu-myeon | Prefectural Route 1018 overlap |
| Dadaedapo Fishing Port | 다대다포항 | | Geoje City | Nambu-myeon | Prefectural Route 1018 overlap |
| Hammok IS | 함목삼거리 | Haegeumgang-ro | Geoje City | Nambu-myeon | Prefectural Route 1018 overlap |
| Hakdong IS | 학동삼거리 | Prefectural Route 1018 (Geojejungang-ro) | Geoje City | Dongbu-myeon | Prefectural Route 1018 overlap |
| Bangchi IS | 망치삼거리 | Bukbyeongsan-ro | Geoje City | Irun-myeon | |
| Gujora IS | 구조라삼거리 | Gujora-ro | Geoje City | Irun-myeon | |
| Nuuraejae IS | 누우래재 교차로 | Wahyeon-ro | Geoje City | Irun-myeon | |
| Sinchon IS | 신촌사거리 | Bansongjae-ro; Jisepohaean-ro | Geoje City | Irun-myeon | |
| Okrim Apartment IS | 옥림아파트 교차로 | Majeon 1-gil | Geoje City | Jangseungpo-dong | |
| Geoje Culture and Arts Center Geojedo Aikwangwon Orphanage | 거제문화예술회관 거제도애광원 | | Geoje City | Jangseungpo-dong | |
| Dumo Rotary | 두모로터리 | Neungpo-ro; Jangseung-ro; Dumo-gil | Geoje City | Jangseungpo-dong | |
| Daewoo Shipbuilding & Marine Engineering | 대우조선해양 | | Geoje City | Aju-dong | |
| 21beon IS | 21번 교차로 | Geoje-daero | Geoje City | Aju-dong | |
| Aju Tunnel | 아주터널 | | Geoje City | Aju-dong | Right tunnel: Approximately 925m Left tunnel: Approximately 905m |
| Sinhyeon Tunnel | 신현터널 | | Geoje City | Aju-dong | Approximately 1900m |
| Sinhyeon Tunnel | | | Geoje City | Suyang-dong | Approximately 1900m |
| Sangdong IS | 상동 교차로 | Prefectural Route 1018 (Geojejungang-ro) | Geoje City | Sangmun-dong | |
| 1beon IS | 1번 교차로 | Prefectural Route 58 (Geoje-daero) | Geoje City | Jangpyeong-dong | Prefectural Route 58 overlap |
| Sagok IS | 사곡삼거리 | Dudong-ro | Geoje City | Sadeung-myeon | Prefectural Route 58 overlap |
| Sangsageun Overpass | 상사근육교 | Gajo-ro | Geoje City | Sadeung-myeon | Prefectural Route 58 overlap |
| Seongpo IS | 성포삼거리 | Seongpo-ro | Geoje City | Sadeung-myeon | Prefectural Route 58 overlap |
| Singye IS | 신계 교차로 | Prefectural Route 1018 (Geojenamseo-ro) | Geoje City | Sadeung-myeon | Prefectural Route 58 overlap |
| Oryang IS | 오량 교차로 | Prefectural Route 1018 (Geojenamseo-ro) | Geoje City | Sadeung-myeon | Prefectural Route 58 overlap |
| Singeoje Bridge | 신거제대교 | | Geoje City | Sadeung-myeon | Prefectural Route 58 overlap |
| Singeoje Bridge | | | Tongyeong City | Yongnam-myeon | Prefectural Route 58 overlap |
| Jangpyeong Overpass | 장평육교 | Gyeonnaeryang-ro; Wonpyeong-gil | Tongyeong City | Yongnam-myeon | Prefectural Route 58 overlap |
| Samhwa IS | 삼화삼거리 | Jangmun-ro | Tongyeong City | Yongnam-myeon | Prefectural Route 58 overlap |
| Tongyeong IC | 통영 나들목 | Tongyeong–Daejeon Expressway | Tongyeong City | Yongnam-myeon | Prefectural Route 58 overlap |
| Miseul IS | 미늘삼거리 | Tongyeonghaean-ro | Tongyeong City | Mujeon-dong | Prefectural Route 58 overlap |
| Gwanmun IS | 관문사거리 | Angae-ro; Jungang-ro | Tongyeong City | Mujeon-dong | Prefectural Route 58 overlap |
| (Wonmun Underpass) | (원문지하차도) | Prefectural Route 67; Prefectural Route 1021 (Wonmun-ro) (Yongho-ro); Jangmun-ro | Tongyeong City | Gwangdo-myeon | Prefectural Route 58, 67 overlap |
| No name | (이름 없음) | Jungnim 4-ro | Tongyeong City | Gwangdo-myeon | Prefectural Route 58, 67 overlap |
| North Tongyeong IC (Nosan IS) | 북통영 나들목 (노산삼거리) | Tongyeong–Daejeon Expressway; National Route 77; Prefectural Route 67; Prefectural Route 1021 (Anjeong-ro) | Tongyeong City | Gwangdo-myeon | National Route 77 overlap Prefectural Route 58, 67, 1021 overlap |
| Solgogae | 솔고개 | | Tongyeong City | Dosan-myeon | National Route 77 overlap Prefectural Route 58, 1021 overlap |
| Gwandeok IS | 관덕삼거리 | Prefectural Route 1021 (Dosanilju-ro) | Tongyeong City | Dosan-myeon | National Route 77 overlap Prefectural Route 58, 1021 overlap |
| Dosan IS | 도산삼거리 | National Route 77; Prefectural Route 58 (Dosanilju-ro) | Tongyeong City | Dosan-myeon | National Route 77 overlap Prefectural Route 58 overlap |
| Yeouchigogae | 여우치고개 | | Tongyeong City | Dosan-myeon | |
| No name | (이름 없음) | Prefectural Route 1010 (Sinwol-ro) | Goseong County | Goseong-eup | Prefectural Route 1010 overlap |
| Wolpyeong IS | 월평삼거리 | Wolpyeong-ro | Goseong County | Goseong-eup | Prefectural Route 1010 overlap |
| Sinwol IC | 신월 나들목 | National Route 33 (Sangjeong-daero) | Goseong County | Goseong-eup | Prefectural Route 1010 overlap |
| No name | (이름 없음) | Dongoe-ro | Goseong County | Goseong-eup | Prefectural Route 1010 overlap |
| Yuldae IS | 율대사거리 | Prefectural Route 1009 (Gongdan-ro) | Goseong County | Goseong-eup | Prefectural Route 1010 overlap |
| No name | (이름 없음) | Jungang-ro | Goseong County | Goseong-eup | Prefectural Route 1010 overlap |
| Songhak IS | 송학 교차로 | Prefectural Route 1010 (Donghae-ro); Songhak-ro | Goseong County | Goseong-eup | Prefectural Route 1010 overlap |
| Songhak IS (Songhak Overpass) | 송학삼거리 (송학고가육교) | Songhakgobun-ro | Goseong County | Goseong-eup | |
| Goseong Bridge | 고성교 | | Goseong County | Goseong-eup | |
| Goseong IC | 고성 나들목 | Tongyeong–Daejeon Expressway | Goseong County | Maam-myeon | |
| Samrak IS | 삼락삼거리 | Danghangman-ro | Goseong County | Maam-myeon | |
| Dojeon IS | 도전삼거리 | Dojeon 1-gil | Goseong County | Maam-myeon | |
| Hwasan IS | 화산삼거리 | Prefectural Route 1007 (Okcheon-ro) | Goseong County | Maam-myeon | |
| Baedun Bridge | 배둔교 | | Goseong County | Maam-myeon | |
| Baedun Bridge | | | Goseong County | Hoehwa-myeon | |
| Baedun Intercity Bus Terminal | 배둔시외버스터미널 | | Goseong County | Hoehwa-myeon | |
| Baedun IS | 배둔사거리 | Prefectural Route 1002 (Yeonghoe-ro) (Baedun-ro 19beon-gil) | Goseong County | Hoehwa-myeon | |
| Baedun IS | 배둔삼거리 | Gwanin-ro | Goseong County | Hoehwa-myeon | |
| Goseongseongsim Hospital Namjin Bridge | 고성성심병원 남진교 | | Goseong County | Hoehwa-myeon | |
| Goseong Tunnel | 고성터널 | | Goseong County | Hoehwa-myeon | Approximately 405m |
| Goseong Tunnel | | | Changwon City | Mansanhappo District Jinjeon-myeon | |
| Hosan IS | 호산 교차로 | Samjinuigeo-daero | Changwon City | Mansanhappo District Jinjeon-myeon | Through Imgok IS; National Route 2 Jinju direction |
| Daesan IS | 대산 교차로 | National Route 2 (Jinma-daero) | Changwon City | Mansanhappo District Jinjeon-myeon | National Route 2 overlap |
| Jinmok IS | 진목 교차로 | National Route 77 (Samjinuigeo-daero) | Changwon City | Mansanhappo District Jinjeon-myeon | National Route 2, National Route 77 overlap |
| Jinjeon Tunnel | 진전터널 | | Changwon City | Mansanhappo District Jinjeon-myeon | Approximately 545m National Route 2, National Route 77 overlap |
| Jinjeon Tunnel | | | Changwon City | Mansanhappo District Jinbuk-myeon | National Route 2, National Route 77 overlap Approximately 545m |
| Yegok IS | 예곡 교차로 | Uirim-ro | Changwon City | Mansanhappo District Jinbuk-myeon | National Route 2, National Route 77 overlap |
| Jisan JCT | 지산 분기점 | National Route 79; Prefectural Route 67 | Changwon City | Mansanhappo District Jinbuk-myeon | National Route 2, National Route 77 overlap Prefectural Route 67 overlap |
| Daepyeong IS | 대평 교차로 | Prefectural Route 1021 (Hakdong-ro) | Changwon City | Mansanhappo District Jinbuk-myeon | National Route 2, National Route 77 overlap |
| Jindong IS | 진동 교차로 | National Route 79 (Jinbuksaneop-ro) | Changwon City | Mansanhappo District Jinbuk-myeon | National Route 2, National Route 77, National Route 79 overlap |
| Jinbuk Tunnel | 진북터널 | | Changwon City | Mansanhappo District Jinbuk-myeon | National Route 2, National Route 77, National Route 79 overlap Approximately 920m |
| Jinbuk Tunnel | | | Changwon City | Mansanhappo District Jindong-myeon | National Route 2, National Route 77, National Route 79 overlap Approximately 920m |
| Taebong Bridge | 태봉교 | | Changwon City | Mansanhappo District Jindong-myeon | National Route 2, National Route 77, National Route 79 overlap |
| Sindaebang IS | 신대방삼거리 | Samjinuigeo-daero | Changwon City | Mansanhappo District Jindong-myeon | National Route 2, National Route 77, National Route 79 overlap |
| Osan IS | 오산 교차로 | Osan 3-gil | Changwon City | Mansanhappo District Jindong-myeon | National Route 2, National Route 77, National Route 79 overlap |
| Taebong IS | 태봉 교차로 | Taebong 2-gil | Changwon City | Mansanhappo District Jindong-myeon | National Route 2, National Route 77, National Route 79 overlap |
| Dongjeon Tunnel Sindongjeon Tunnel | 동전터널 신동전터널 | | Changwon City | Mansanhappo District Jindong-myeon | National Route 2, National Route 77, National Route 79 overlap Dongjeon Tunnel (Approximately 590m); Sindongjeon Tunnel (Approximately 1050m) |
| Dongjeon Tunnel Sindongjeon Tunnel | | | Changwon City | Mansanhappo District | National Route 2, National Route 77, National Route 79 overlap Dongjeon Tunnel (Approximately 590m); Sindongjeon Tunnel (Approximately 1050m) |
| Hyeondong JCT | 현동 분기점 | National Route 5 | Changwon City | Mansanhappo District | National Route 2, National Route 5, National Route 77, National Route 79 overlap |
| Hyeondong IS | 현동 교차로 | National Route 2 National Route 5 National Route 77 (Gyeongnam-daero) (Namhaean-daero) | Changwon City | Mansanhappo District | National Route 2, National Route 5, National Route 77, National Route 79 overlap |
| No name | (이름 없음) | Muhak-ro | Changwon City | Mansanhappo District | National Route 79 overlap |
| Wolyeong Square Kyungnam University | 월영광장 경남대학교 | Gapo-ro; Kyungnam University Road; Haean-daero | Changwon City | Mansanhappo District | National Route 79 overlap |
| Banwol-dong Community Center | 반월동주민센터 | | Changwon City | Mansanhappo District | National Route 79 overlap |
| Masanhappo-gu Office Masan Medical Center | 마산합포구청 마산의료원 | | Changwon City | Mansanhappo District | National Route 79 overlap |
| Muhak Elementary School | 무학초등학교 | | Changwon City | Mansanhappo District | National Route 79 overlap |
| Seoseong Square | 서성광장 | Seoseong-ro; Happo-ro | Changwon City | Mansanhappo District | National Route 79 overlap |
| No name | (이름 없음) | Bukseong-ro | Changwon City | Mansanhappo District | National Route 79 overlap |
| 6th Square | 6호광장 | Buljonggeori-ro; Cheonhajangsa-ro; Heodang-ro | Changwon City | Mansanhappo District | National Route 79 overlap |
| No name | (이름 없음) | Muhak-ro | Changwon City | Masanhoewon District | National Route 79 overlap |
| Seokjeongyo IS | 석전교 교차로 | Prefectural Route 30 (Samho-ro) | Changwon City | Masanhoewon District | National Route 79 overlap Prefectural Route 30 overlap |
| Masan Station | 마산역앞 | Masannyeokgwangjang-ro; Yangdeok-ro | Changwon City | Masanhoewon District | National Route 79 overlap Prefectural Route 30 overlap |
| Masan City Bus Terminal | 마산시외버스터미널 | | Changwon City | Masanhoewon District | National Route 79 overlap Prefectural Route 30 overlap |
| East Masan IC | 동마산 나들목 | Namhae Expressway Branch 1 | Changwon City | Masanhoewon District | National Route 79 overlap Prefectural Route 30 overlap |
| Changwon Overpass | 창원육교 | | Changwon City | Masanhoewon District | National Route 79 overlap Prefectural Route 30 overlap |
| Changwon Overpass | | | Changwon City | Uichang District | National Route 79 overlap Prefectural Route 30 overlap |
| Sogye Square | 소계광장 | National Route 79 (Jeongnyeol-daero) | Changwon City | Uichang District | National Route 79 overlap Prefectural Route 30 overlap |
| Changwon Station IS (Changwon Station Express bus stop) | 창원역사거리 (창원역시외고속버스정류소) | Uichang-daero 62beon-gil | Changwon City | Uichang District | Prefectural Route 30 overlap |
| Changwon Station IS | 창원역삼거리 | Sahwa-ro | Changwon City | Uichang District | Prefectural Route 30 overlap |
| Seosang IS | 서상삼거리 | Namsan-ro | Changwon City | Uichang District | Prefectural Route 30 overlap |
| Dongjeong IS | 동정삼거리 | Seosang-ro | Changwon City | Uichang District | Prefectural Route 30 overlap |
| Uichang IS | 의창사거리 | Cheonju-ro; Paryong-ro | Changwon City | Uichang District | Prefectural Route 30 overlap |
| Samgusa IS | 삼구사사거리 | Pyeongsan-ro; Uichang-daero 261beon-gil | Changwon City | Uichang District | Prefectural Route 30 overlap |
| Dogye Square | 도계광장 | Woni-daero | Changwon City | Uichang District | Prefectural Route 30 overlap |
| Namsan IC | 남산 나들목 | National Route 25 (Haewon-ro); Uichang-daero | Changwon City | Uichang District Dong-eup | National Route 25 overlap Prefectural Route 30 overlap |
| Deoksan IS | 덕산 교차로 | Uichang-daero | Changwon City | Uichang District Dong-eup | National Route 25 overlap Prefectural Route 30 overlap |
| Deokcheon IS | 덕천 교차로 | Prefectural Route 30 (Dongeup-ro) | Changwon City | Uichang District Dong-eup | National Route 25 overlap Prefectural Route 30 overlap |
| Mujeom Tunnel | 무점터널 | | Changwon City | Uichang District Dong-eup | National Route 25 overlap Approximately 350m |
| Dongeup IS | 동읍 교차로 | National Route 25 (Jinsan-daero) | Gimhae City | Jinyeong-eup | National Route 25 overlap |
| Stadium IS | 공설운동장 교차로 | Gimhae-daero | Gimhae City | Jinyeong-eup | |
| Bupyeong IS | 부평사거리 | Yeorae-ro; Jangdong-ro | Gimhae City | Jinyeong-eup | |
| Jinyeonghanbit Library | 진영한빛도서관 | | Gimhae City | Jinyeong-eup | |
| Bonsan Entrance IS | 본산입구삼거리 | Bonsan1-ro | Gimhae City | Jinyeong-eup | |
| Seolchang IS | 설창사거리 | Prefectural Route 1042 (Seobu-ro); Jinyeong-ro | Gimhae City | Jinyeong-eup | |
| Binggrae IS | 빙그레삼거리 | Gomo-ro | Gimhae City | Jinyeong-eup | |
| Singi IS | 신기삼거리 | Gimhae-daero 916beon-gil | Gimhae City | Hallim-myeon | |
| Soeop IS | 소업삼거리 | Gimhae-daero | Gimhae City | Hallim-myeon | |
| Byeongdong IS | 병동 교차로 | Gimhae-daero 974beon-gil | Gimhae City | Hallim-myeon | |
| Gimhae 1 Tunnel | 김해1터널 | | Gimhae City | Hallim-myeon | Right tunnel: Approximately 1,502m Left tunnel: Approximately 1,510m |
| Gimhae 1 Tunnel | | | Gimhae City | Juchon-myeon | Right tunnel: Approximately 1,502m Left tunnel: Approximately 1,510m |
| Deokam IS | 덕암 교차로 | Seobu-ro 1637beon-gil | Gimhae City | Juchon-myeon | |
| Gimhae 2 Tunnel | 김해2터널 | | Gimhae City | Juchon-myeon | Approximately 480m |
| Gimhae 3 Tunnel | 김해3터널 | | Gimhae City | Juchon-myeon | Approximately 380m |
| Daebak Bridge | 대박교 | | Gimhae City | Juchon-myeon | |
| Juchon IS | 주촌 교차로 | Prefectural Route 1042 (Seobu-ro) | Gimhae City | Juchon-myeon | |
| Nongso 2 Bridge | 농소2교 | | Gimhae City | Juchon-myeon | |
| Nongso 2 Bridge | | | Gimhae City | Chilsanseobu-dong | |
| Chilsan IS | 칠산 교차로 | Namhae Expressway; Prefectural Route 1020 (Chilsan-ro); Geumgwan-daero | Gimhae City | Chilsanseobu-dong | Connected with West Gimhae IC |
| Gangdong Bridge | 강동교 | | Gimhae City | Chilsanseobu-dong | Continuation into Busan |

=== Busan·Gimhae ===
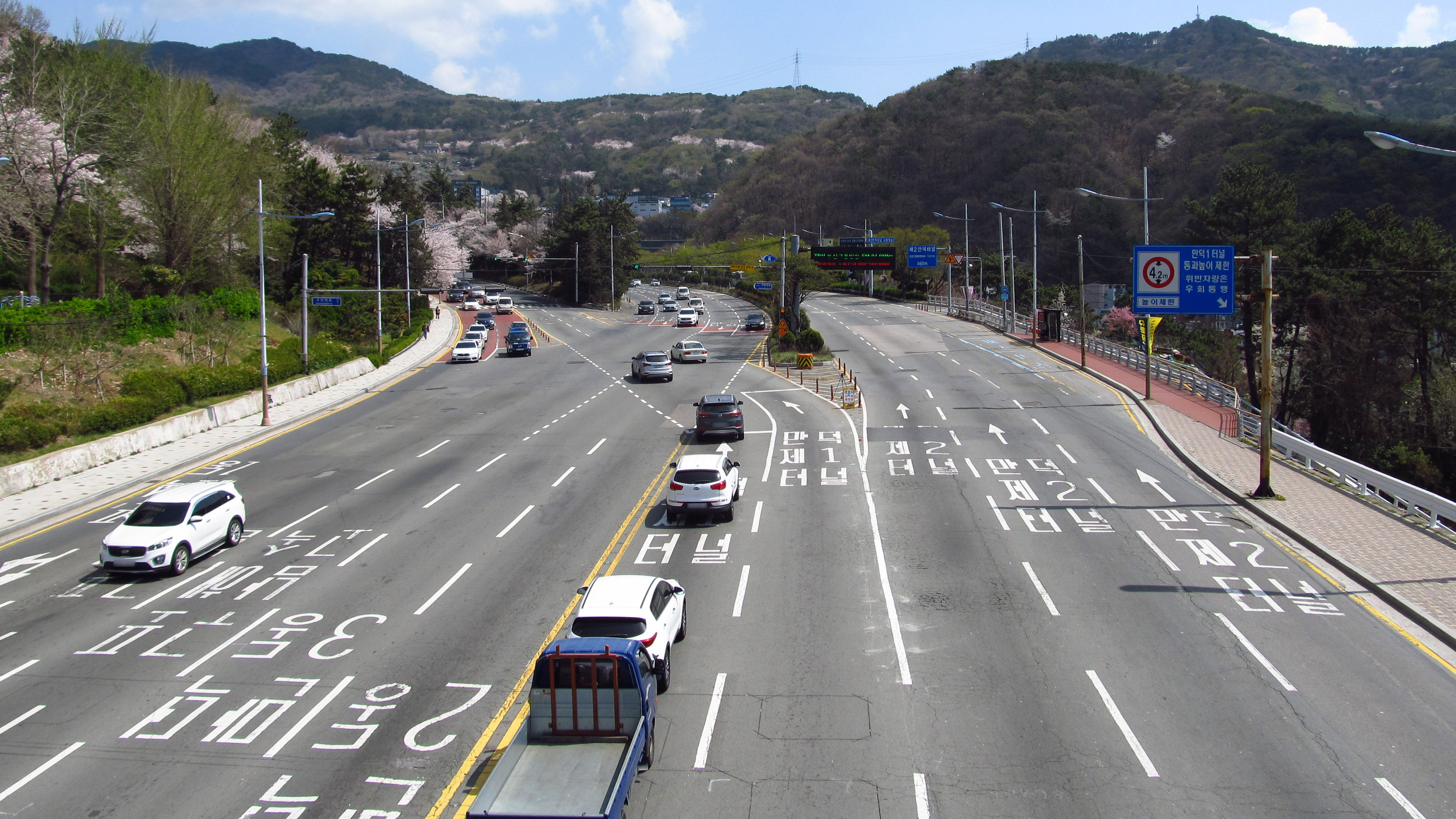
Mandeok Station IS.

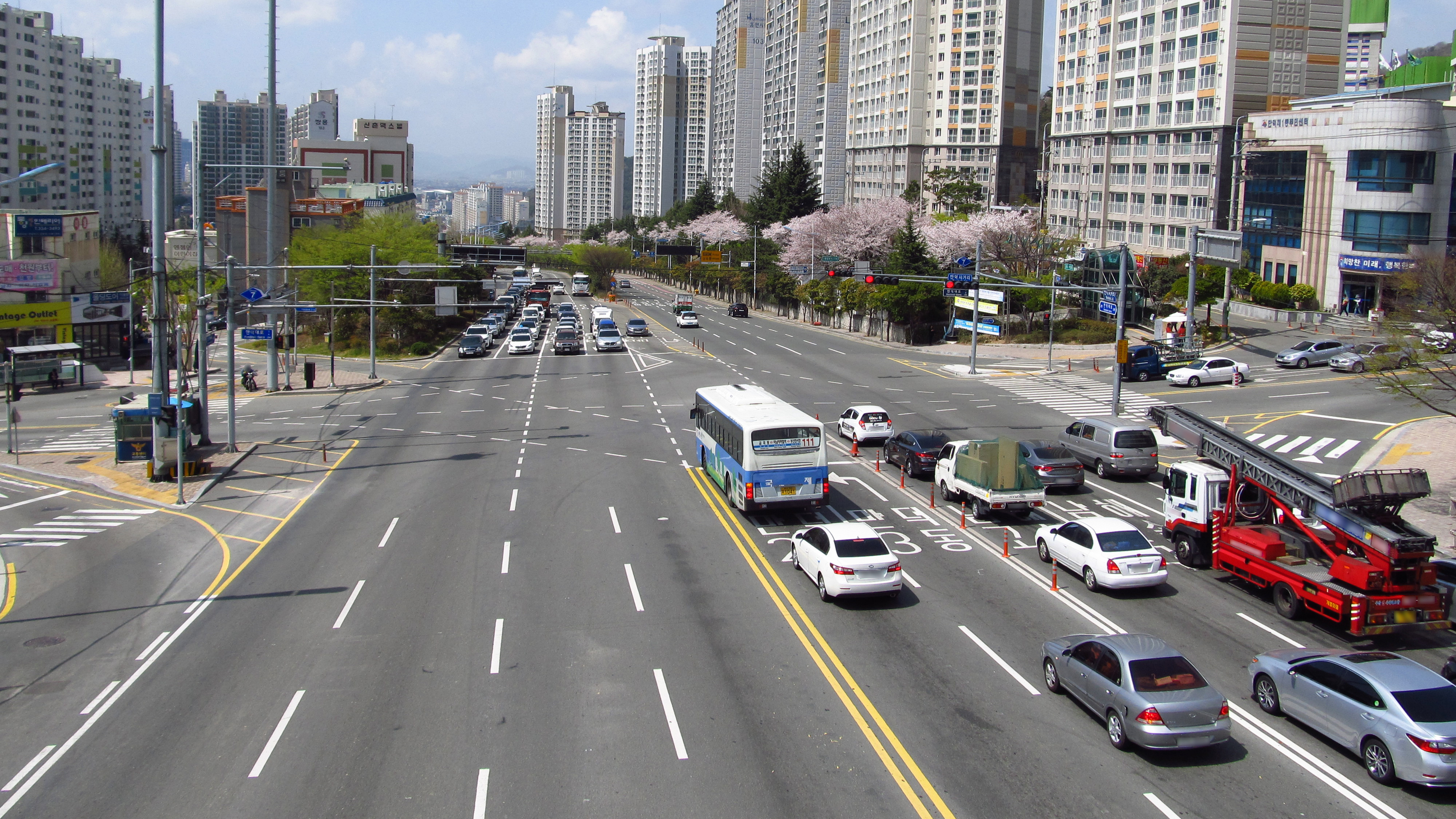
Mandeok Station IS.

| Name | Hangul name | Connection | Location | | Note |
|---|---|---|---|---|---|
| Gangdong Bridge | 강동교 | | Busan | Gangseo District | South Gyeongsang Province - Busan border line |
| Buwon IS | 부원 교차로 | Hogye-ro | Busan | Gangseo District | |
| Sikman JCT | 식만 분기점 | Prefectural Route 69 (Seonakdong-ro) | Busan | Gangseo District | Prefectural Route 69 overlap |
| Sikman Bridge | 식만교 | | Busan | Gangseo District | Prefectural Route 69 overlap |
| Sikman Bridge | | | Gimhae City | Buram-dong | |
| Gimhae Bridge (Buram Underpass) | 김해교 서단 (불암지하차도) | Gimhae-daero; Daedong-ro | Gimhae City | Buram-dong | |
| Gimhae Bridge | 김해교 | | Gimhae City | Buram-dong | |
| Gimhae Bridge | | | Busan | Gangseo District | |
| Daesa 1 gu IS (Daesa Station) | 대사1구 교차로 (대사역) | Jedo-ro; Nakdongbung-ro 73 beon-gil Nakdongbung-ro 76 beon-gil | Busan | Gangseo District | |
| Pyeonggang Station | 평강역 | Daejeojungang-ro | Busan | Gangseo District | |
| No name | (이름 없음) | Daejeo-ro | Busan | Gangseo District | |
| Daejeo Station Sports Park Station | 대저역 체육공원역 | | Busan | Gangseo District | |
| Sindaejeo IS (Daesang Underpass) | 신대저 교차로 (대상지하차도) | Cheyukgongwon-ro | Busan | Gangseo District | |
| Gangseo District Office (Gangseo-gu Office Station) | 강서구청 (강서구청역) | | Busan | Gangseo District | |
| Daedong IS | 대동사거리 | Gonghang-ro | Busan | Gangseo District | |
| Gupo Bridge | 구포대교 | | Busan | Gangseo District | |
| Gupo Bridge | | | Busan | Buk District | |
| Gupo Bridge IS | 구포대교 교차로 | | Busan | Buk District | |
| Gupo Station | 구포역 | | Busan | Buk District | |
| Deokcheon IS (Deokcheon Station) | 덕천 교차로 (덕천역) | National Route 35 (Geumgok-daero); Baegyang-daero | Busan | Buk District | |
| Sukdeung IS | 숙등 교차로 | Uiseong-ro | Busan | Buk District | |
| Sukdeung Station | 숙등역 | | Busan | Buk District | |
| Namsanjeong IS (Namsanjeong Station) | 남산정 교차로 (남산정역) | Gichal-ro; Mandeok 3-ro | Busan | Buk District | |
| Expressway Entrance IS | 고속도로입구 교차로 | Prefectural Route 66 (Namhae Expressway Connector Road) | Busan | Buk District | |
| Mandeok IS (Mandeok Station) | 만덕사거리 (만덕역) | Mandeok 1-ro Mandeok 2-ro | Busan | Buk District | |
| No name | (이름 없음) | Gumandeok-ro | Busan | Buk District | |
| Mandeok 2 Tunnel | 만덕2터널 | | Busan | Buk District | Approximately 3084m |
| Mandeok 2 Tunnel | | | Busan | Dongnae District | Approximately 3084m |
| Minam IS (Minam Station) | 미남 교차로 (미남역) | Asiad-daero; Ujangchun-ro | Busan | Dongnae District | |
| Naeseong IS (Dongnae Station) | 내성 교차로 (동래역) | National Route 7 (Jungang-daero) | Busan | Dongnae District | |
| Dongnae IS (Suan Station) | 동래 교차로 (수안역) | Myeongnyun-ro | Busan | Dongnae District | |
| Dongnae High School (Nangmin Station) | 동래고등학교 (낙민역) | Nangmin-ro | Busan | Dongnae District | |
| Allak IS | 안락 교차로 | Bansong-ro; Chungnyeol-daero; Chungnyeol-daero 350beon-gil | Busan | Dongnae District | |
| Chungnyeolsa Station Myeongjang Station | 충렬사역 명장역 | | Busan | Dongnae District | |
| Geumsa Entrance | 금사입구 | Seodongjungsim-ro | Busan | Geumjeong District | |
| Seo-dong Station | 서동역 | | Busan | Geumjeong District | |
| Geumsa IS | 금사 교차로 | Gaejwa-gil; Seodong-ro | Busan | Geumjeong District | |
| Geumsa Station | 금사역 | | Busan | Geumjeong District | |
| Dongcheon Bridge (east side) | 동천교 동단 | Beonyeong-ro | Busan | Geumjeong District | |
| Dongcheon Bridge | 동천교 | | Busan | Geumjeong District | |
| Dongcheon Bridge | | | Busan | Haeundae District | |
| Seokdae IS | 석대사거리 | Suyeonggangbyeon-daero | Busan | Haeundae District | |
| Banyeo Agricultural Market Station | 반여농산물시장역 | | Busan | Haeundae District | |
| No name | (이름 없음) | Seokdae-ro | Busan | Haeundae District | |
| Youngsan University Station | 영산대역 | Araetbansong-ro | Busan | Haeundae District | |
| Woonsong Elementary School Bansong Health Center | 운송초등학교 반송보건지소 | | Busan | Haeundae District | |
| Bansong2hogyo IS | 반송2호교 교차로 | Witbansong-ro | Busan | Haeundae District | |
| Dong-Pusan College Station | 동부산대학역 | | Busan | Haeundae District | |
| Unbong IS (Gochon Station) | 운봉삼거리 (고촌역) | Witbansong-ro | Busan | Haeundae District | |
| Anpyeong station | 안평역 | Gochon-ro | Gijang County | Cheolma-myeon | |
| Anpyeong rail yard | 안평차량기지 | | Gijang County | Cheolma-myeon | |
| Cheolma IS | 철마삼거리 | Cheolma-ro | Gijang County | Cheolma-myeon | |
| Jungang IS | 중앙사거리 | Chaseong-ro | Gijang County | Gijang-eup | |
| Gyori IS | 교리삼거리 | Gijang-daero | Gijang County | Gijang-eup | |
| Gijang Gymnasium | 기장체육관 | | Gijang County | Gijang-eup | |
| Gijang Police Station | 부산기장경찰서 | | Gijang County | Ilgwang-myeon | |
| Ilgwang IS | 일광 교차로 | Ilgwang-ro | Gijang County | Ilgwang-myeon | |
| Saessak IS | 새싹삼거리 | Ihwa-ro | Gijang County | Ilgwang-myeon | |
| Gijang IC (Ilgwang IS) | 기장 나들목 (일광 교차로) | Donghae Expressway; National Route 31 | Gijang County | Ilgwang-myeon | |
| Hwajeon IS | 화전 교차로 | Hwayong-gil | Gijang County | Ilgwang-myeon | |
| Cheonggwang Viaduct | 청광고가교 | Asiad CC | Gijang County | Ilgwang-myeon | |
| Jwacheon IS | 좌천삼거리 | Jwacheon-ro | Gijang County | Ilgwang-myeon | |
| Jwacheon Bridge | 좌천교 | | Gijang County | Ilgwang-myeon | |
| Jwacheon Bridge | | | Gijang County | Jangan-eup | |
| Jwacheon IS (Soto Overpass) | 좌천사거리 (소토육교) | Prefectural Route 60 (Jeonggwan-ro) (Jwacheon-ro) | Gijang County | Jangan-eup | |
| Jwadong IS | 좌동삼거리 | Jwadong-gil | Gijang County | Jangan-eup | |
| Jangan IC (Jangan IC IS) | 장안 나들목 (장안IC 교차로) | Donghae Expressway | Gijang County | Jangan-eup | |
| Jangan IS | 장안삼거리 | Jangan-ro | Gijang County | Jangan-eup | |
| Giryong-ri IS | 기룡리 교차로 | Jangan-ro | Gijang County | Jangan-eup | |
| Giryong IS | 기룡 교차로 | Ballyong-ro | Gijang County | Jangan-eup | |
| Myeongrye Service Area | 명례휴게소 | | Gijang County | Jangan-eup | Continuation into Ulsan |

- Motorway section
  - Gangseo District Gangdong Bridge ~ Sikman JCT (Dongseo-daero)

=== Ulsan ===
| Name | Hangul name | Connection | Location | | Note |
|---|---|---|---|---|---|
| Myeongrye Service Area | 명례휴게소 | | Ulju County | Onyang-eup | Busan - Ulsan border line |
| Onyang IS | 온양사거리 | Gwangcheong-ro; Onyang-ro | Ulju County | Onyang-eup | |
| Namchang IS | 남창삼거리 | Namchanggangbyeon-ro | Ulju County | Onyang-eup | |
| Oego IS | 외고산삼거리 | Oegosan-gil | Ulju County | Onyang-eup | |
| Onsan IS | 온산삼거리 | Deoksin-ro | Ulju County | Onyang-eup | |
| Mangyang IS | 망양삼거리 | Deongmang-ro | Ulju County | Onyang-eup | |
| Wondong IS | 원동삼거리 | | Ulju County | Onyang-eup | |
| Dongcheon 1 Bridge | 동천1교 | | Ulju County | Onyang-eup | |
| Dongcheon 1 Bridge | | | Ulju County | Cheongnyang-myeon | |
| Dongcheon 2 Bridge | 동천2교 | | Ulju County | Cheongnyang-myeon | |
| Jene IS | 제네삼거리 | Deokha-ro | Ulju County | Cheongnyang-myeon | |
| Cheongnyang IC (Cheongnyang IC IS) | 청량 나들목 (청량IC 교차로) | Donghae Expressway; Sinhang-ro | Ulju County | Cheongnyang-myeon | |
| Deokjeong IS | 덕정 교차로 | Samjeong-ro | Ulju County | Cheongnyang-myeon | |
| Gaesan IS | 개산 교차로 | Cheongnyangcheonbyeon-ro | Ulju County | Cheongnyang-myeon | |
| Duwang IS | 두왕삼거리 | Namchang-ro | Ulsan | Nam District | |
| Gaegok 1 Bridge | 개곡1교 | Cheongnyangcheonbyeon-ro | Ulju County | Cheongnyang-myeon | |
| Yulri Bus Garage | 율리공영차고지 | National Route 7 (Ungchon-ro) | Ulju County | Cheongnyang-myeon | National Route 7 overlap |
| Duhyeon IS | 두현삼거리 | Cheongnyangcheonbyeon-ro | Ulju County | Cheongnyang-myeon | National Route 7 overlap |
| Mugeo Bus stop | 무거정류장 | | Ulju County | Cheongnyang-myeon | National Route 7 overlap |
| Mugeo IS | 무거삼거리 | Munsu-ro | Ulsan | Nam District | National Route 7 overlap |
| Wooshin High School | 우신고등학교앞 | Daehak-ro 11beon-gil | Ulsan | Nam District | National Route 7 overlap |
| Jeonggol IS | 정골삼거리 | Okhyeon-ro | Ulsan | Nam District | National Route 7 overlap |
| Ulsan College West Campus | 울산과학대학교 서부캠퍼스 | Daehak-ro 55beon-gil | Ulsan | Nam District | National Route 7 overlap |
| University of Ulsan | 울산대학교 | | Ulsan | Nam District | National Route 7 overlap |
| Back of Ulsan University | 울산대후문 | | Ulsan | Nam District | National Route 7 overlap |
| Soejeong IS | 쇠정사거리 | Sinbok-ro | Ulsan | Nam District | National Route 7 overlap |
| Ulsan IC (Sinbok Rotary) | 울산 나들목 (신복로터리) | Ulsan Expressway; Nambusunhwando-ro; Samho-ro | Ulsan | Nam District | National Route 7 overlap |
| Sanho Apartment | 산호아파트앞 | Samho-ro 37beon-gil | Ulsan | Nam District | National Route 7 overlap |
| Samho Bridge IS | 삼호교남 교차로 | National Route 24 (Ulmil-ro); Namsan-ro | Ulsan | Nam District | National Route 7 overlap |
| Samho Bridge | 삼호교 | | Ulsan | Nam District | National Route 7 overlap |
| Samho Bridge | | | Ulsan | Jung District | National Route 7 overlap |
| Daun IS | 다운사거리 | National Route 7 (Bukbusunhwan-doro); Taehwa-ro | Ulsan | Jung District | National Route 7 overlap |
| Samsung Apartment Complex Entrance | 삼성아파트단지입구 | Gurumi 2-gil Ungok-gil | Ulsan | Jung District | |
| Daun Hyundai Apartment Entrance | 다운현대아파트입구 | Gurumi 4-gil Ungok 6-gil | Ulsan | Jung District | |
| Cheokgwa Bridge | 척과교 | | Ulsan | Jung District | |
| Daun Elementary School | 다운초교앞 | Daun 2-gil Daun 13-gil | Ulsan | Jung District | |
| Daun Apartment Entrance | 다운아파트입구 | Daun-ro; Daun 3-gil | Ulsan | Jung District | |
| Daundong Apartment | 다운동아아파트앞 | | Ulsan | Jung District | |
| No name | (이름 없음) | Dajeon-ro | Ulsan | Jung District | |
| Seosa IS | 서사사거리 | Seosa-ro | Ulju County | Beomseo-eup | |
| Daesin Bridge | 대신교 | | Ulju County | Beomseo-eup | |
| Beomseo IC | 범서 나들목 | Donghae Expressway | Ulju County | Beomseo-eup | Continuation into North Gyeongsang Province |

- Motorway
  - Nam District Duwang IS ~ Ulju County Cheongnyang-myeon Yulri Bus Garage (Cheongnyang-ro)

=== North Gyeongsang Province ===
| Name | Hangul name | Connection | Location | | Note |
|---|---|---|---|---|---|
| Nokdong-ri | 녹동리 | | Gyeongju City | Oedong-eup | Ulsan - North Gyeongsang Province border line |
| Seokgye Bridge (South side) | 석계교 남단 | | Gyeongju City | Oedong-eup | |
| Ubak Bridge | 우박대교 | | Gyeongju City | Oedong-eup | |
| Mohwa IS | 모화사거리 | National Route 7 (Saneop-ro) | Gyeongju City | Oedong-eup | National Route 7 overlap |
| Oedong Agro-Industrial Complex | 외동농공단지 | | Gyeongju City | Oedong-eup | National Route 7 overlap |
| Gueo IS | 구어사거리 | National Route 7 (Saneop-ro) | Gyeongju City | Oedong-eup | National Route 7 overlap |
| Ipsil IS | 입실삼거리 | Ipsil-ro | Gyeongju City | Oedong-eup | |
| No name | (이름 없음) | Eupcheongsa-ro | Gyeongju City | Oedong-eup | |
| East Hill CC | 이스트힐CC | Prefectural Route 945 | Gyeongju City | Yangnam-myeon | |
| No name | (이름 없음) | Prefectural Route 904 (Oenam-ro) | Gyeongju City | Yangnam-myeon | One-lane section |
| Hyojae | 효재 | | Gyeongju City | Yangnam-myeon | One-lane section |
| Jukjeon Bridge | 죽전교 | | Gyeongju City | Yangbuk-myeon | One-lane section |
| Songjeon 2 Bridge Songjeon 1 Bridge Dusan Bridge | 송전2교 송전1교 두산대교 | | Gyeongju City | Yangbuk-myeon | One-lane section |
| Dusan IS | 두산 교차로 | Prefectural Route 929 (Munmudaewang-ro) | Gyeongju City | Yangbuk-myeon | Prefectural Route 929 overlap |
| East Gyeongju IC (Eoil IS) | 동경주 나들목 (어일 교차로) | Donghae Expressway | Gyeongju City | Yangbuk-myeon | Prefectural Route 929 overlap |
| Cheokhyeon IS | 척현 교차로 | Gameun-ro | Gyeongju City | Yangbuk-myeon | Prefectural Route 929 overlap |
| Yangbuk IS | 양북 교차로 | Gameun-ro | Gyeongju City | Yangbuk-myeon | Prefectural Route 929 overlap |
| Yangbuk Health Center | 양북보건지소 | | Gyeongju City | Yangbuk-myeon | Prefectural Route 929 overlap |
| Waeup IS | 와읍 교차로 | National Route 4 (Tohamsa-ro); Gyeonggam-ro | Gyeongju City | Yangbuk-myeon | Prefectural Route 929 overlap |
| Waeup Bridge | 와읍교 | | Gyeongju City | Yangbuk-myeon | Prefectural Route 929 overlap |
| Waeup Bridge (West side) | 와읍교 서단 | Prefectural Route 929 (Waeubyongdong-gil) | Gyeongju City | Yangbuk-myeon | Prefectural Route 929 overlap |
| Andong IS | 안동삼거리 | Gyeonggam-ro | Gyeongju City | Yangbuk-myeon | |
| Hoam Bridge Girimsa Yongdong Bridge | 호암교 기림사 용동교 | | Gyeongju City | Yangbuk-myeon | |
| Jinjeon Bridge Galpyeong Bridge | 진전교 갈평교 | | Pohang City | Nam District Ocheon-eup | |
| Ocheon IS | 오천 교차로 | Jung Mongju-ro 294beon-gil | Pohang City | Nam District Ocheon-eup | |
| No name | (이름 없음) | Cheolgang-ro | Pohang City | Nam District Ocheon-eup | |
| Ocheon-eup Office | 오천읍사무소 | | Pohang City | Nam District Ocheon-eup | |
| (Ocheon Market Entrance) | (오천시장입구) | Prefectural Route 929 (Janggi-ro) | Pohang City | Nam District Ocheon-eup | |
| Ocheon Elementary School | 오천초등학교 | | Pohang City | Nam District Ocheon-eup | |
| Yongdeok IS | 용덕사거리 | Jung Mongju-ro 616beon-gil Jung Mongju-ro 617beon-gil | Pohang City | Nam District Ocheon-eup | |
| No name | (이름 없음) | Chungmu-ro | Pohang City | Nam District Ocheon-eup | |
| Cheongrim IS | 청림삼거리 | National Route 31 (Donghaean-ro) | Pohang City | Nam District | Terminus |
