= National Route 2 (South Korea) =

Road in South Korea

National Route 2
- 국도 제2호선

Route information
- Length: 477.4 km (296.6 mi)
- Existed: 31 August 1971–present

Major junctions
- West end: Local Road 805 at Bukgang Port, Sinan
- East end: National Route 7 in Jung, Busan

Location
- Country: South Korea

Highway system
- Highway systems of South Korea; Expressways; National; Local

National Route 2 (Korean: 국도 제2호선; RR: Gukdo Je I(2) Hoseon) is a national highway in South Korea that runs from Bukgang Port in Jangsan-myeon, Sinan County, Jeollanam-do, through Gyeongsangnam-do, and to the Old City Hall Intersection in Jung-gu, Busan. It was first established on 31 August 1971. The original road connected Mokpo to Busan, but in 2004, a road that connects Sinan to Mokpo opened to traffic.

== History ==
In the early 1950s, the government designated major arterial roads as national highways to systematically reorganize the national transportation network. This was the first time National Route 2 was established. Initially, the route connected Busan and Gwangju, serving as key transportation connecting Yeongnam and Honam along the southern coast.

Since then, National Route 2 has undergone several adjustments to reflect road network improvements, administrative district reorganization, and changing transportation needs. The current route begins in Daeyeon-dong, Nam-gu, Busan, near the port of Busan, and ends in Mokpo, Jeollanam-do. Major transit points include Busan, Gimhae, Changwon, Jinju, Hadong, Namhae, Yeosu, Suncheon, Boseong, Jangheung, Gangjin, and Haenam, making it a long-distance trunk road that runs along the southern coast.

National Route 2 is significant in many ways beyond its simple function as a transportation route. First, it significantly contributes to the promotion of the tourism industry by connecting major tourist destinations along the southern coast, including Namhae, Yeosu, Suncheon, Gangjin, Haenam, and Mokpo. Second, by linking Busan Port and Gwangyang Port, it plays a pivotal role in the movement of industrial logistics in the Yeongnam and southern Honam regions. Third, despite the expansion of high-speed arterial roads, such as the Namhae Expressway and the Yeosu-Suncheon Expressway, which have somewhat dispersed traffic volume, National Route 2 continues to function as a practical means of inter-regional connectivity and local transportation.

Today, National Route 2 is contributing to easing urban congestion through expansion and bypass construction in some sections. It is also closely linked to the government's South Coast Tourist Road Development Project. In this regard, National Route 2 is expected to continue to hold strategic importance for regional development and balanced national development.

== Main stopovers ==
South Jeolla Province

- Sinan County - Mokpo - Muan County - Yeongam County - Gangjin County - Jangheung County - Boseong County - Suncheon - Gwangyang

South Gyeongsang Province

- Hadong County - Sacheon - Jinju - Changwon

Busan

- Gangseo District - Saha District - Seo District - Jung District

== Major intersections ==
- (■): Motorway

IS: Intersection, IC: Interchange

=== South Jeolla Province ===
Name	Hangul name	Connection	Location		Note
Bukgang Harbor	북강항	Prefectural Route 805	Sinan County	Jangsan-myeon	Terminus
Jangsan-myeon Health Center Jangsan Elementary School	장산면보건지소 장산초등학교		Sinan County	Jangsan-myeon	
Aendu Pier	앤두선착장		Sinan County	Jangsan-myeon	
Bridge	(교량 명칭 미상)		Sinan County	Jangsan-myeon	Under construction Connect Jangsan-do ~ Makgeum-do
Makgeum-do	막금도		Sinan County	Jangsan-myeon	Under construction
Bridge	(교량 명칭 미상)		Sinan County	Jangsan-myeon	Under construction Connect Makgeum-do ~ Sinui-do
Bridge			Sinan County	Sinui-myeon	Under construction Connect Makgeum-do ~ Sinui-do
Sangtaeseo-ri	상태서리		Sinan County	Sinui-myeon	Under construction
Sinui Post Office Sinui-myeon Office	신의우체국 신의면사무소		Sinan County	Sinui-myeon	
Tari-do	타리도		Sinan County	Sinui-myeon	
No name	(이름 없음)	Noeun-gil	Sinan County	Sinui-myeon	
No name	(이름 없음)	Hatae-gil	Sinan County	Sinui-myeon	
Gidong Pier	기동선착장		Sinan County	Sinui-myeon	
Samdo Bridge	삼도대교		Sinan County	Sinui-myeon	
Samdo Bridge			Sinan County	Haui-myeon	
Bongdo Pier	봉도선착장		Sinan County	Haui-myeon	
Orim-ri	오림리		Sinan County	Haui-myeon	
No name	(이름 없음)	Angomsil-gil	Sinan County	Haui-myeon	
Haui Health Center	하의보건지소		Sinan County	Haui-myeon	
(Front of Haui-myeon Office)	(하의면사무소앞)	Gomsil-gil	Sinan County	Haui-myeon	
Haui 3-do Peasant Movement Memorial Hall	하의3도농민운동기념관		Sinan County	Haui-myeon	
Dangdu Pier	당두선착장		Sinan County	Haui-myeon	
Bridge	(교량 명칭 미상)		Sinan County	Haui-myeon	Under construction Connect Haui-do ~ Neungsan-do
Neungsan-do	능산도		Sinan County	Haui-myeon	Under construction
Bridge	(교량 명칭 미상)		Sinan County	Haui-myeon	Under construction Connect Neungsan-do ~ Daeya-do
Bridge	(교량 명칭 미상)		Sinan County	Haui-myeon	Under construction Connect Daeya-do ~ Docho-do
Bridge			Sinan County	Docho-myeon	Under construction Connect Daeya-do ~ Docho-do
Jukyeon-ri	죽연리		Sinan County	Docho-myeon	
No name	(이름 없음)	Goran-gil; Simok-gil	Sinan County	Docho-myeon	
Docho Elementary School Docho-myeon Office	도초초등학교 도초면사무소		Sinan County	Docho-myeon	
Docho Middle School Docho High School	도초중학교 도초고등학교	Dochoseo-gil	Sinan County	Docho-myeon	
Geuma Bridge	금아교		Sinan County	Docho-myeon	
No name	(이름 없음)	Oenam-gil	Sinan County	Docho-myeon	
No name	(이름 없음)	Dochobuk-gil	Sinan County	Docho-myeon	
Seonammun Bridge	서남문대교		Sinan County	Docho-myeon	
Seonammun Bridge			Sinan County	Bigeum-myeon	
No name	(이름 없음)	Songchi-gil	Sinan County	Bigeum-myeon	
Bigeum Nonghyup	비금농협	Bigeumbukbu-gil	Sinan County	Bigeum-myeon	
No name	(이름 없음)	Eupdong-gil	Sinan County	Bigeum-myeon	
No name	(이름 없음)	Bigeumbukbu-gil	Sinan County	Bigeum-myeon	
Gasan-ri	가산리		Sinan County	Bigeum-myeon	
Gwangdae-ri	광대리		Sinan County	Bigeum-myeon	Under construction
Bridge	(교량 명칭 미상)		Sinan County	Bigeum-myeon	Under construction Connect Bigeum-do ~ Chupo-do
Bridge			Sinan County	Amtae-myeon	Under construction Connect Bigeum-do ~ Chupo-do
Chupo Clinic	추포보건진료소		Sinan County	Amtae-myeon	
Nodu-gil	노두길		Sinan County	Amtae-myeon	
Tenant farmers Strife Park	소작인항쟁비공원	Prefectural Route 805 (Jungbu-ro)	Sinan County	Amtae-myeon	Prefectural Route 805 overlap
Amtae Middle School Entrance	암태중학교입구	Jangdango-gil	Sinan County	Amtae-myeon	Prefectural Route 805 overlap
Gidong IS	기동삼거리	Prefectural Route 805 (Jungbu-ro)	Sinan County	Amtae-myeon	Prefectural Route 805 overlap
Jangddeul IS	장뜰삼거리	Ikgeum-gil	Sinan County	Amtae-myeon	
Odo Pier (Odo IS)	오도선착장 (오도 교차로)		Sinan County	Amtae-myeon	
Saecheonnyeon Bridge	새천년대교		Sinan County	Amtae-myeon	Approximately 7,260m
Saecheonnyeon Bridge			Sinan County	Aphae-eup	Approximately 7,260m
Songgong Harbor	송공항		Sinan County	Aphae-eup	
Songgong IS	송공 교차로		Sinan County	Aphae-eup	Under construction
Aphaeseo Elementary School	압해서초등학교		Sinan County	Aphae-eup	
Aphae-eup Office	압해읍사무소	National Route 77 (Bokryong-ro)	Sinan County	Aphae-eup	National Route 77 overlap
Sinan County Library Aphaedong Elementary School	신안군립도서관 압해동초등학교		Sinan County	Aphae-eup	National Route 77 overlap
Sinjang IS	신장 교차로	National Route 77 (Cheonsa-ro)	Sinan County	Aphae-eup	National Route 77 overlap
Aphae Bridge	압해대교		Sinan County	Aphae-eup	
Aphae Bridge			Mokpo City	연산동	
Sanjeong IS	산정 교차로	National Route 1 (Goha-daero); Yongdang-ro	Mokpo City	Samhyang-dong	National Route 1 overlap
Naehwa IS	내화 교차로	Naehwamaeul-gil 135beon-gil	Mokpo City	Samhyang-dong	National Route 1 overlap
Mokpo IC	목포 나들목	National Route 1 (Yeongsan-ro)	Mokpo City	Samhyang-dong	National Route 1 overlap Seohaean Expressway West End
Mokpo IC		National Route 1 (Yeongsan-ro)	Muan County	Samhyang-eup	National Route 1 overlap Seohaean Expressway West End
Jungnim JCT	죽림 분기점	Seohaean Expressway	Muan County	Samhyang-eup	
Namak JCT	남악 분기점	Prefectural Route 49 (Namakdonggang-ro); Hugwang-daero	Muan County	Samhyang-eup	
Namchangcheon Bridge	남창천교		Muan County	Samhyang-eup	
Namchangcheon Bridge			Muan County	Illo-eup	
Cheongho IC	청호 나들목	Prefectural Route 49 (Illo-ro)	Muan County	Illo-eup	
Muyeong Bridge	무영대교		Muan County	Illo-eup	
Muyeong Bridge			Yeongam County	Haksan-myeon	
Seokpo IS	석포 교차로	Prefectural Route 821 (Yeongsan-ro)	Yeongam County	Haksan-myeon	
West Yeongam IC	서영암 나들목	Namhae Expressway	Yeongam County	Haksan-myeon	
Mangwolcheon Bridge	망월천교		Yeongam County	Haksan-myeon	
Mangwolcheon Bridge			Yeongam County	Samho-eup	
Baekya IS	백야 교차로	Wonseoho-gil	Yeongam County	Samho-eup	
Seoho IS	서호 교차로	Noksaek-ro	Yeongam County	Samho-eup	
Maeja IS	매자사거리	Maejari-gil	Yeongam County	Samho-eup	
Seochang Reservoir	서창저수지	Daebodung-ro	Yeongam County	Samho-eup	
Sadong IS	사동삼거리	Dokcheon-ro; Yeongsan-ro	Yeongam County	Samho-eup	
Singi Overpass	신기육교		Yeongam County	Miam-myeon	
Chaeji IS	채지삼거리	Prefectural Route 819 (Heukseok-ro)	Yeongam County	Miam-myeon	Prefectural Route 819 overlap
Haksan IS	학산 교차로	Prefectural Route 819 (Yeongam-ro)	Yeongam County	Miam-myeon	Prefectural Route 819 overlap
Gyeyang Bridge	계양교		Yeongam County	Miam-myeon	
Gyeyang Bridge			Yeongam County	Haksan-myeon	
Choan IS	초안삼거리	Geumgye-ro; Galmadalsan-gil	Yeongam County	Haksan-myeon	
Gwangam IS	광암삼거리	Gonmihyeon-ro	Yeongam County	Haksan-myeon	
Bamjae IS	밤재삼거리	Byeolmoe-ro	Gangjin County	Seongjeon-myeon	
Wolsan IS	월산 교차로	National Route 13 (Gongnyong-daero)	Gangjin County	Seongjeon-myeon	National Route 13 overlap
Wolpyeong IS	월평 교차로	National Route 13 (Yehyang-ro)	Gangjin County	Seongjeon-myeon	National Route 13 overlap
Namseongjeon IS	남성전삼거리	Prefectural Route 830 (Geumgang-ro)	Gangjin County	Seongjeon-myeon	Former Prefectural Route 814
Gangjin-Muwisan IC	강진무위사 나들목	Namhae Expressway	Gangjin County	Seongjeon-myeon	
Geumdang IS	금당 교차로	Songgye-ro	Gangjin County	Seongjeon-myeon	
Hwajeon IS	화전 교차로	Songgye-ro	Gangjin County	Gangjin-eup	
Hongam IS	홍암 교차로	Solchi-ro; Songgye-ro; Songjeong-gil	Gangjin County	Gangjin-eup	
Pyeongdong IS	평동 교차로	National Route 18; Prefectural Route 55 (Gangjinseobu-ro); Boeun-ro	Gangjin County	Gangjin-eup	National Route 18 overlap Prefectural Route 55 overlap
Nampo IS	남포 교차로	Namdang-ro; Nampo-gil	Gangjin County	Gangjin-eup	National Route 18 overlap Prefectural Route 55 overlap
Mokri 1 Bridge	목리1교		Gangjin County	Gangjin-eup	National Route 18 overlap Prefectural Route 55 overlap
Mokri 1 Bridge			Gangjin County	Gundong-myeon	National Route 18 overlap Prefectural Route 55 overlap
Mokri IS	목리 교차로	National Route 23 (Cheongja-ro)	Gangjin County	Gundong-myeon	National Route 18 overlap Prefectural Route 55 overlap
Tamjin Bridge	탐진교		Gangjin County	Gundong-myeon	National Route 18 overlap Prefectural Route 55 overlap
Gundong IS	군동 교차로	Seokgyo-ro	Gangjin County	Gundong-myeon	National Route 18 overlap Prefectural Route 55 overlap
Pyeongchang Bridge	평창교		Gangjin County	Gundong-myeon	National Route 18 overlap Prefectural Route 55 overlap
Pyeongchang Bridge			Jangheung County	Jangheung-eup	National Route 18 overlap Prefectural Route 55 overlap
Tamjin 2 Bridge	탐진2교		Jangheung County	Jangheung-eup	National Route 18 overlap Prefectural Route 55 overlap
Sunji IS	순지 교차로	National Route 23; Prefectural Route 55 (Jangheung-daero)	Jangheung County	Jangheung-eup	National Route 18 overlap Prefectural Route 55 overlap
Pyeonghwa Bridge	평화교		Jangheung County	Jangheung-eup	National Route 18 overlap
Hyangyang IS	향양 교차로	National Route 18 (Nambugwangwang-ro)	Jangheung County	Jangheung-eup	National Route 18 overlap
No name	(이름 미상)	Jeamsan-gil	Jangheung County	Jangheung-eup	
Unchi	운치		Jangheung County	Jangheung-eup	
Unchi			Jangheung County	Busan-myeon	
Busan Access Road	부산진입로	Heungseong-ro	Jangheung County	Busan-myeon	
Busan IS	부산 교차로	Heungseong-ro	Jangheung County	Busan-myeon	
Hogye Tunnel	호계터널		Jangheung County	Busan-myeon	Approximately 811m
Hogye Tunnel			Jangheung County	Jangdong-myeon	Approximately 811m
Yonggok IS	용곡진입로	Geogae-gil; Wolgok-gil	Jangheung County	Jangdong-myeon	
Jeam Tunnel	제암터널		Jangheung County	Jangdong-myeon	Approximately 360m
Jangdong IS	장동 교차로	Prefectural Route 839 (Bukgyobansan-ro)	Jangheung County	Jangdong-myeon	
Baesan Access Road	배산진입로	Baesanubong-gil	Jangheung County	Jangdong-myeon	
Baesan Tunnel	배산터널		Jangheung County	Jangdong-myeon	Approximately 570m
Baesan Tunnel			Boseong County	Boseong-eup	Approximately 570m
Daeya IS	대야 교차로	Gangsan-gil	Boseong County	Boseong-eup	
Jori IS	조리 교차로	Prefectural Route 895 (Illim-ro)	Boseong County	Boseong-eup	
Kwaesang IS	쾌상 교차로	Kwaesang-gil	Boseong County	Boseong-eup	
Jangsu IS	장수 교차로	National Route 18; National Route 77 (Nokcha-ro)	Boseong County	Boseong-eup	National Route 18, National Route 77 overlap
Chodang IS	초당 교차로	National Route 18 (Hwabo-ro); Heungseong-ro	Boseong County	Miryeok-myeon	National Route 18, National Route 77 overlap
Geureokjae	그럭재		Boseong County	Miryeok-myeon	National Route 77 overlap
Geureokjae			Boseong County	Deungnyang-myeon	National Route 77 overlap
Gundu IS	군두사거리	Prefectural Route 843; Prefectural Route 845 (Chungui-ro)	Boseong County	Deungnyang-myeon	National Route 77 overlap Prefectural Route 843 overlap
Yedang IS	예당사거리	Yedang-gil; Pacheong-gil	Boseong County	Deungnyang-myeon	National Route 77 overlap Prefectural Route 843 overlap
Joseongnam Elementary School	조성남초등학교		Boseong County	Joseong-myeon	National Route 77 overlap Prefectural Route 843 overlap
Joseong IS	조성삼거리	Joseong-ro	Boseong County	Joseong-myeon	National Route 77 overlap Prefectural Route 843 overlap
Sinwol IS	신월삼거리	National Route 77 (Joseong-ro)	Boseong County	Joseong-myeon	National Route 77 overlap Prefectural Route 843 overlap
Yeolgajae	열가재		Boseong County	Joseong-myeon	Prefectural Route 843 overlap
Yeolgajae			Boseong County	Beolgyo-eup	Prefectural Route 843 overlap
Okcheon Bridge	옥천교		Boseong County	Beolgyo-eup	Prefectural Route 843 overlap
Beolgyo IC (Beolgyo IC IS)	벌교 나들목 (벌교IC 교차로)	Namhae Expressway	Boseong County	Beolgyo-eup	Prefectural Route 843 overlap
Boseong Fire Station	보성소방서		Boseong County	Beolgyo-eup	Prefectural Route 843 overlap
Beolgyo IS	벌교 교차로	National Route 15; National Route 27; Prefectural Route 15 (Ujuhanggong-ro)	Boseong County	Beolgyo-eup	Prefectural Route 843 overlap
Cheokryeong IS	척령삼거리	Wondong-gil	Boseong County	Beolgyo-eup	Prefectural Route 843 overlap
Wondong Bridge	원동교		Boseong County	Beolgyo-eup	Prefectural Route 843 overlap
Jangjwa IS	장좌 교차로	Prefectural Route 843 (Namha-ro); Chedongseon-ro	Boseong County	Beolgyo-eup	Prefectural Route 843 overlap
Beolgyo Bridge	벌교대교		Boseong County	Beolgyo-eup	
Geumchijae IS	금치재 교차로	Hongam-ro	Boseong County	Beolgyo-eup	
Geumchi IS	금치삼거리	Geumchi-gil	Suncheon City	Byeollyang-myeon	
Guryong Bridge	구룡교		Suncheon City	Byeollyang-myeon	
Sagyejeol IS	사계절삼거리	Chinhwangyeong-gil	Suncheon City	Byeollyang-myeon	
Sinseok IS	신석사거리	Byeollyang-gil; Bongrim-gil	Suncheon City	Byeollyang-myeon	
Sangrim IS	상림사거리	Byeollyang-gil; Ilchul-gil	Suncheon City	Byeollyang-myeon	
Usan IS	우산삼거리	Usanoedong-gil	Suncheon City	Byeollyang-myeon	
Inwol IS	인월사거리	Deokjeong-gil; Suncheonman-gil	Suncheon City	Dosa-dong	
Suncheonman IC	순천만 나들목	Namhae Expressway	Suncheon City	Dosa-dong	
Suncheon Hyocheon High School	순천효천고등학교		Suncheon City	Dosa-dong	
Daeryong IS	대룡사거리	Daeryong-gil; Yangyul-gil	Suncheon City	Dosa-dong	
Yeondong Bridge	연동교		Suncheon City	Dosa-dong	
Yeondong IS	연동삼거리	Prefectural Route 58 (Minsokmaeul-gil)	Suncheon City	Dosa-dong	Prefectural Route 58 overlap
Cheongam College IS (Suncheon Cheongam College) (Cheongam High School)	청암대사거리 (청암대학교) (청암고등학교)	Sangsaho-gil; Suncheonman-gil	Suncheon City	Dosa-dong	Prefectural Route 58 overlap
Hohyeon IS	호현삼거리	Prefectural Route 22 (Useok-ro)	Suncheon City	Dosa-dong	Prefectural Route 22, 58 overlap
Seomun IS	서문삼거리		Suncheon City	Dosa-dong	Prefectural Route 22, 58 overlap
Suncheon Bay National Garden	순천만국가정원		Suncheon City	Dosa-dong	Prefectural Route 22, 58 overlap
No name	(이름 없음)	Gangbyeon-ro	Suncheon City	Dosa-dong	Prefectural Route 22, 58 overlap
Dongcheon Bridge	동천교		Suncheon City	Dosa-dong	Prefectural Route 22, 58 overlap
Dongcheon Bridge			Suncheon City	Pungdeok-dong	Prefectural Route 22, 58 overlap
Suncheon Lake Garden	순천호수정원		Suncheon City	Pungdeok-dong	Prefectural Route 22, 58 overlap
Haeryong Bridge	해룡교		Suncheon City	Pungdeok-dong	Prefectural Route 22, 58 overlap
Haeryong Bridge			Suncheon City	Deogyeon-dong	Prefectural Route 22, 58 overlap
Palma IS	팔마사거리	Yeosun-ro; Palma-ro	Suncheon City	Deogyeon-dong	Prefectural Route 22, 58 overlap
Yeonhyang Overpass	연향육교		Suncheon City	Deogyeon-dong	Prefectural Route 22, 58 overlap
Jorye IS	조례사거리	Baekgang-ro; Isu-ro	Suncheon City	Wangji-dong	Prefectural Route 22, 58 overlap
Suncheon Jorye Elementary School Human Resources Development Service Jeonnam Branch	순천조례초등학교 한국산업인력공단 전남지사		Suncheon City	Wangji-dong	Prefectural Route 22, 58 overlap
No name	(이름 없음)	Jibong-ro	Suncheon City	Wangji-dong	Prefectural Route 22, 58 overlap
Sangbi IS	상비 교차로	National Route 17; Prefectural Route 22 (Mupyeong-ro)	Suncheon City	Wangji-dong	Prefectural Route 22, 58 overlap
Suncheon Saint Carollo Hospital	순천성가롤로병원		Suncheon City	Wangji-dong	Prefectural Route 58 overlap
Bansongjae	반송재		Suncheon City	Wangji-dong	Prefectural Route 58 overlap
Bansongjae			Gwangyang City	Gwangyang-eup	Prefectural Route 58 overlap
Boo Young International Ice Rink	부영국제빙상장		Gwangyang City	Gwangyang-eup	Prefectural Route 58 overlap
Deokrye IS	덕례사거리	Prefectural Route 863 (Indeok-ro)	Gwangyang City	Gwangyang-eup	Prefectural Route 58 overlap
Gwangyang Bridge	광양교		Gwangyang City	Gwangyang-eup	Prefectural Route 58 overlap
No name	(이름 없음)	Seocheonbyeon-ro	Gwangyang City	Gwangyang-eup	Prefectural Route 58 overlap
Old Gwangyang Station Gwangyang Bus Terminal	구 광양역 광양종합버스터미널		Gwangyang City	Gwangyang-eup	Prefectural Route 58 overlap
Indong IS	인동 교차로	Sinjae-ro; Supsaem-gil	Gwangyang City	Gwangyang-eup	Prefectural Route 58 overlap
Yudang Park	유당공원		Gwangyang City	Gwangyang-eup	Prefectural Route 58 overlap
Usijang IS	우시장사거리	Prefectural Route 840; Prefectural Route 865 (Maecheon-ro)	Gwangyang City	Gwangyang-eup	Prefectural Route 58, 865 overlap
Gwangyang IC (Indong IC)	광양 나들목 (인동 나들목)	Namhae Expressway; Gwangyanghangjeonyong 1-ro	Gwangyang City	Gwangyang-eup	Prefectural Route 58, 865 overlap
Chonam Bridge	초남교		Gwangyang City	Gwangyang-eup	Prefectural Route 58, 865 overlap
Police Station	경찰서앞	Prefectural Route 865 (Jecheol-ro)	Gwangyang City	Gwangyang-eup	Prefectural Route 58, 865 overlap
Seokjeong IS	석정삼거리	Yongdu-gil	Gwangyang City	Gwangyang-eup	Prefectural Route 58 overlap
Songchijae	송치재		Gwangyang City	Gwangyang-eup	Prefectural Route 58 overlap
Songchijae			Gwangyang City	Golyak-dong	Prefectural Route 58 overlap
Junggeun Overpass	중근육교	Prefectural Route 58 (Okjin-ro)	Gwangyang City	Golyak-dong	Prefectural Route 58 overlap
East Gwangyang IC	동광양 나들목	Namhae Expressway	Gwangyang City	Golyak-dong	
No name	(이름 없음)	Gwangyanghangjeonyong 2-ro	Gwangyang City	Golyak-dong	
Golyak IS	골약 교차로	Bullo-ro; Seonghwang-gil	Gwangyang City	Golyak-dong	
Container Terminal IS	컨테이너부두사거리	Jungma-ro	Gwangyang City	Jungma-dong	
Gwangyang Civic Square	광양시민광장		Gwangyang City	Jungma-dong	
City Hall IS	시청앞사거리	Jungmajungang-ro	Gwangyang City	Jungma-dong	
No name	(이름 없음)	Jungma-ro	Gwangyang City	Jungma-dong	
Wawoo Ecological Lake Park	와우생태호수공원		Gwangyang City	Jungma-dong	
Geumho IS	금호 교차로	Prefectural Route 861 (Gangbyeon-ro)	Gwangyang City	Gwangyang-dong	
Geumho Bridge	금호대교		Gwangyang City	Gwangyang-dong	
Geumho Bridge			Gwangyang City	Geumho-dong	
Baekun Art Hall IS	백운아트홀사거리	Geumho-ro	Gwangyang City	Geumho-dong	
Jecheol1mun IS	제철1문사거리	Jecheol-ro	Gwangyang City	Geumho-dong	
Laboratory IS	연구소앞삼거리	Pokposarang-gil	Gwangyang City	Geumho-dong	
Jecheol IS	제철삼거리	Geumho-ro	Gwangyang City	Geumho-dong	
Taein Bridge IS	태인교삼거리	Jecheol-ro	Gwangyang City	Geumho-dong	
Taein Bridge	태인교		Gwangyang City	Geumho-dong	
Taein Bridge			Gwangyang City	Taein-dong	
Yongji IS	용지삼거리	National Route 59 (Taein 4-gil)	Gwangyang City	Taein-dong	
Taein Bridge	태인대교		Gwangyang City	Taein-dong	
Taein Bridge			Gwangyang City	Jinwol-myeon	
No name	(이름 없음)	Prefectural Route 861 (Mangdeok-gil)	Gwangyang City	Jinwol-myeon	
Jinwol IC	진월 나들목	Namhae Expressway	Gwangyang City	Jinwol-myeon	
Seonso IS	선소사거리	Seomjingangmaehwa-ro; Seonsojungang-gil	Gwangyang City	Jinwol-myeon	Connected with Prefectural Route 861
Gwangyang Jinwol Middle School	광양진월중학교		Gwangyang City	Jinwol-myeon	
Jinsang Bridge	진상교		Gwangyang City	Jinsang-myeon	
Seomgeo IS	섬거사거리	Prefectural Route 58 (Okjin-ro)	Gwangyang City	Jinsang-myeon	Prefectural Route 58 overlap
Sueo Dam Entrance	수어댐입구	Bichonsueo-gil	Gwangyang City	Jinsang-myeon	Prefectural Route 58 overlap
Tanchi IS	탄치삼거리	Baekhak-ro	Gwangyang City	Jinsang-myeon	Prefectural Route 58 overlap
Maechijae	매치재		Gwangyang City	Jinsang-myeon	Prefectural Route 58 overlap
Maechijae			Gwangyang City	Jinwol-myeon	Prefectural Route 58 overlap
Wondang IS	원당삼거리	Prefectural Route 861 (Seomjingangmaehwa-ro)	Gwangyang City	Daap-myeon	Prefectural Route 58, 861 overlap
Sinwon IS	신원삼거리	Prefectural Route 861 (Sinwon-gil)	Gwangyang City	Daap-myeon	Prefectural Route 58, 861 overlap
Seomjin Bridge	섬진교		Gwangyang City	Daap-myeon	Prefectural Route 58 overlap Continuation into South Gyeongsang Province

=== South Gyeongsang Province ===
Name	Hangul name	Connection	Location		Note
Seomjin Bridge	섬진교		Hadong County	Hadong-eup	South Jeolla Province - South Gyeongsang Province border line Prefectural Route 58 overlap
Seomjin Bridge IS	섬진교사거리	National Route 19; National Route 59 (Seomjingang-daero)	Hadong County	Hadong-eup	National Route 19, National Route 59 overlap Prefectural Route 58 overlap
Hadong High School Hadong Elementary School	하동고등학교 하동초등학교		Hadong County	Hadong-eup	National Route 19, National Route 59 overlap Prefectural Route 58 overlap
Hadong Police Station	하동경찰서	Guncheong-ro; Hyanggyo 1-gil	Hadong County	Hadong-eup	National Route 19, National Route 59 overlap Prefectural Route 58 overlap
Hadong Intercity Bus Terminal	하동시외버스터미널	National Route 19 (Jungang-ro)	Hadong County	Hadong-eup	National Route 19, National Route 59 overlap Prefectural Route 58 overlap
Hadong Station	하동역		Hadong County	Hadong-eup	National Route 59 overlap Prefectural Route 58 overlap
Bipa IS	비파삼거리	Gongseorundongjang-ro	Hadong County	Hadong-eup	National Route 59 overlap Prefectural Route 58 overlap
Jeokryang-myeon IS	적량면삼거리	Jeongnyang-ro	Hadong County	Jeokryang-myeon	National Route 59 overlap Prefectural Route 58 overlap
Heongcheon Elementary School	횡천초등학교		Hadong County	Hoengcheon-myeon	National Route 59 overlap Prefectural Route 58 overlap
Hoengcheon IS	횡천삼거리	Prefectural Route 1003 (Cheonghak-ro)	Hadong County	Hoengcheon-myeon	National Route 59 overlap Prefectural Route 58, 1003 overlap
Hoengcheon-myeon Office Heongcheon Middle School	횡천면사무소 횡천중학교		Hadong County	Hoengcheon-myeon	National Route 59 overlap Prefectural Route 58, 1003 overlap
Daedeok IS	대덕삼거리	National Route 59 (Dolgoji-ro)	Hadong County	Hoengcheon-myeon	National Route 59 overlap Prefectural Route 58, 1003 overlap
Gamdang IS	감당삼거리	Prefectural Route 1003 (Jinyang-ro)	Hadong County	Yangbo-myeon	Prefectural Route 58, 1003 overlap
Hwangtojae	황토재		Hadong County	Yangbo-myeon	Prefectural Route 58 overlap
Hwangtojae			Hadong County	Bukcheon-myeon	Prefectural Route 58 overlap
Banghwa Clinic	방화보건진료소		Hadong County	Bukcheon-myeon	Prefectural Route 58 overlap
No name	(이름 없음)	Prefectural Route 1005 (Gonbuk-ro)	Hadong County	Bukcheon-myeon	Prefectural Route 58, 1005 overlap
Bukcheon Station Bukcheon-myeon Office	북천역 북천면사무소		Hadong County	Bukcheon-myeon	Prefectural Route 58, 1005 overlap
Daeya Bridge	대야교	Prefectural Route 1005 (Okdan-ro)	Hadong County	Bukcheon-myeon	Prefectural Route 58, 1005 overlap
Wonjeon IS	원전 교차로	Prefectural Route 58 (Gonmyeong 1-ro)	Sacheon City	Gonmyeong-myeon	Prefectural Route 58 overlap
Bonggye IS	봉계 교차로	Gonmyeong 1-ro	Sacheon City	Gonmyeong-myeon	
Orang Bridge	오랑교		Sacheon City	Gonmyeong-myeon	
Orang IS	오랑 교차로	Orang-gil	Sacheon City	Gonmyeong-myeon	
Saedong IS	새동 교차로	Mukseong-ro	Sacheon City	Gonmyeong-myeon	
Maehwa IS	매화 교차로	Jakpal-gil	Sacheon City	Gonmyeong-myeon	
Jeonggok IS	정곡 교차로	Prefectural Route 1001 (Gonsu-ro) (Heungsin-ro)	Sacheon City	Gonmyeong-myeon	
Wansa Station (Wansa Station IS)	완사역 (완사역 교차로)		Sacheon City	Gonmyeong-myeon	
Wansa Bridge	완사교		Sacheon City	Gonmyeong-myeon	
Yeonpyeong IS	연평 교차로	Yeonpyeong-gil	Sacheon City	Gonmyeong-myeon	
Naepyeong IS	내평 교차로	Naechuk-ro 577beon-gil	Sacheon City	Gonmyeong-myeon	
Solti Bridge Yangji Bridge	솔티교 양지교		Jinju City	Naedong-myeon	
Jeongdong IS	정동 교차로	Naechuk-ro 577beon-gil	Jinju City	Naedong-myeon	
Madong Bridge	마동교	Prefectural Route 1049 (Naechuk-ro)	Jinju City	Naedong-myeon	
Baeyang Bridge	배양교	Prefectural Route 1049 (Hoban-ro)	Jinju City	Naedong-myeon	
Samgye Bridge	삼계교		Jinju City	Naedong-myeon	
Samgye IS	삼계 교차로	Samgye-ro; Chilbongsan-gil	Jinju City	Naedong-myeon	
Sagi IS	산기 교차로	Chilbongsan-gil	Jinju City	Naedong-myeon	
Mosan IS	모산 교차로	Sanyu-ro; Chilbongsan-gil	Jinju City	Naedong-myeon	
Naedong IS	내동 교차로	National Route 3 National Route 33 (Sunhwan-ro)	Jinju City	Naedong-myeon	National Route 3, National Route 33 overlap
Hwagye IS	화개 교차로	National Route 3 National Route 33 (Jinju-daero)	Jinju City	Jeongchon-myeon	National Route 3, National Route 33 overlap
Jukbong IS	죽봉 교차로	Hwagae-gil 194beon-gil	Jinju City	Jeongchon-myeon	
Oksan 1 Overpass	옥산1육교		Jinju City	Gaho-dong	
Oksan IS	옥산 교차로	Jinma-daero	Jinju City	Gaho-dong	
Yeongcheongang 1 Bridge	영천강1교		Jinju City	Munsan-eup	
Munsan IS	문산 교차로	Prefectural Route 1009 (Worasan-ro)	Jinju City	Munsan-eup	
Sangmun IS	상문 교차로	Prefectural Route 1007 (Munsan-ro)	Jinju City	Munsan-eup	Prefectural Route 1007 overlap
Jinseong IS	진성 교차로	Prefectural Route 1007 (Dongbu-ro)	Jinju City	Jinseong-myeon	Prefectural Route 1007 overlap
Jinseong Overpass	진성고가교		Jinju City	Jinseong-myeon	
Jinseong Tunnel	진성터널		Jinju City	Jinseong-myeon	Right tunnel: Approximately 570m Left tunnel: Approximately 510m
Cheongok 1 Bridge Cheongok 2 Bridge	천곡1교 천곡2교		Jinju City	Jinseong-myeon	
Muchon IS	무촌 교차로	Dongbu-ro	Jinju City	Sabong-myeon	
Muchon Bridge	무촌교		Jinju City	Sabong-myeon	
Banseong IS	반성 교차로	Dongbu-ro	Jinju City	Sabong-myeon	
Banseong Railway Overpass	반성철도육교		Jinju City	Ilbanseong-myeon	
Banseong 2 Bridge	반성2교		Jinju City	Ilbanseong-myeon	
Banseong 2 Bridge			Jinju City	Ibanseong-myeon	
Sumokwon IS	수목원 교차로	Dongbu-ro; Sumokwon-ro; Daecheon-gil	Jinju City	Ibanseong-myeon	
Ibanseong IS	이반성 교차로	Prefectural Route 30 (Obongsan-ro)	Jinju City	Ibanseong-myeon	
Gilseong IS	길성 교차로	Gilseong-gil; Jinma-daero 2520beon-gil	Jinju City	Ibanseong-myeon	
Balsanjae	발산재		Jinju City	Ibanseong-myeon	
Balsanjae			Changwon City	Masanhappo District Jinjeon-myeon	
Bongam IS	봉암 교차로	Prefectural Route 1029 (Paluisa-ro)	Changwon City	Masanhappo District Jinjeon-myeon	
Dongsan IS	동산 교차로	Paruisa-ro	Changwon City	Masanhappo District Jinjeon-myeon	
Sewol 2 Bridge	세월2교		Changwon City	Masanhappo District Jinjeon-myeon	
Imgok IS	임곡 교차로	Samjinuigeo-daero	Changwon City	Masanhappo District Jinjeon-myeon	Through Hosan IS; Connected with National Route 14 (To Geoje)
Daesan IS	대산 교차로	National Route 14 (Namhaean-daero); Samjinuigeo-daero	Changwon City	Masanhappo District Jinjeon-myeon	National Route 14 overlap
Jinmok IS	진목 교차로	National Route 77; Prefectural Route 67 (Samjinuigeo-daero)	Changwon City	Masanhappo District Jinjeon-myeon	National Route 14, National Route 77 overlap Prefectural Route 67 overlap
Jinjeon Tunnel	진전터널		Changwon City	Masanhappo District Jinjeon-myeon	National Route 14, National Route 77 overlap Prefectural Route 67 overlap Right tunnel: Approximately 550m Left tunnel: Approximately 600m
Jinjeon Tunnel			Changwon City	Masanhappo District Jinbuk-myeon	National Route 14, National Route 77 overlap Prefectural Route 67 overlap Right tunnel: Approximately 550m Left tunnel: Approximately 600m
Yegok IS	예곡 교차로	Uirim-ro	Changwon City	Masanhappo District Jinbuk-myeon	National Route 14, National Route 77 overlap Prefectural Route 67 overlap
Jisan JCT	지산 분기점	National Route 79	Changwon City	Masanhappo District Jinbuk-myeon	Under construction National Route 14, National Route 77 overlap Prefectural Route 67 overlap
Daepyeong IS	대평 교차로	Prefectural Route 1021 (Hakdong-ro)	Changwon City	Masanhappo District Jinbuk-myeon	National Route 14, National Route 77 overlap Prefectural Route 67 overlap
Jindong IS	진동 교차로	National Route 79; Prefectural Route 67 (Jinbuksaneop-ro)	Changwon City	Masanhappo District Jinbuk-myeon	National Route 14, National Route 77, National Route 79 overlap Prefectural Route 67 overlap
Jinbuk Tunnel	진북터널		Changwon City	Masanhappo District Jinbuk-myeon	National Route 14, National Route 77, National Route 79 overlap Approximately 927m
Jinbuk Tunnel			Changwon City	Masanhappo District Jindong-myeon	National Route 14, National Route 77, National Route 79 overlap Approximately 927m
Taebong Bridge	태봉교		Changwon City	Masanhappo District Jindong-myeon	National Route 14, National Route 77, National Route 79 overlap
Sindaebang IS	신대방삼거리	Samjinuigeo-daero	Changwon City	Masanhappo District Jindong-myeon	National Route 14, National Route 77, National Route 79 overlap
Osan IS	오산 교차로	Osan 3-gil	Changwon City	Masanhappo District Jindong-myeon	National Route 14, National Route 77, National Route 79 overlap
Taebong IS	태봉 교차로	Taebong 2-gil	Changwon City	Masanhappo District Jindong-myeon	National Route 14, National Route 77, National Route 79 overlap
Dongjeon Tunnel Sindongjeon Tunnel	동전터널 신동전터널		Changwon City	Masanhappo District Jindong-myeon	National Route 14, National Route 77, National Route 79 overlap East-bound: Sindongjeon Tunnel (Approximately 1080m); West-bound: Dongjeon Tunnel (Approximately 609m)
Dongjeon Tunnel Sindongjeon Tunnel			Changwon City	Masanhappo District	National Route 14, National Route 77, National Route 79 overlap East-bound: Sindongjeon Tunnel (Approximately 1080m); West-bound: Dongjeon Tunnel (Approximately 609m)
Hyeondong JCT	현동 분기점	National Route 5	Changwon City	Masanhappo District	National Route 5, National Route 14, National Route 77, National Route 79 overlap
Hyeondong IS	현동 교차로	National Route 5 (Gyeongnam-daero); National Route 14; National Route 79 (Bambatgogae-ro)	Changwon City	Masanhappo District	National Route 5, National Route 14, National Route 77, National Route 79 overlap
Gapo Tunnel	가포터널		Changwon City	Masanhappo District	National Route 77 overlap Right tunnel: Approximately 1,230m Left tunnel: Approximately 1,235m
Gapo IS	가포 교차로	Dream bay-daero	Changwon City	Masanhappo District	National Route 77 overlap
Machang Bridge	마창대교		Changwon City	Masanhappo District	National Route 77 overlap Toll Road
Machang Bridge			Changwon City	Seongsan District	National Route 77 overlap Toll Road
Machang Bridge Toll Gate (Gwisangogae)	마창대교 요금소 (귀산고개)		Changwon City	Seongsan District	National Route 77 overlap
Gwisan 1 Bridge	귀산1교	Gwisan-ro	Changwon City	Seongsan District	National Route 77 overlap
Gwisan Tunnel	귀산터널		Changwon City	Seongsan District	National Route 77 overlap Right tunnel: Approximately 345m Left tunnel: Approximately 403m
Yanggok Tunnel	양곡터널		Changwon City	Seongsan District	National Route 77 overlap Right tunnel: Approximately 1,135m Left tunnel: Approximately 1,046m
Yanggok IC	양곡 나들목	Namhaean-daero; Bongyang-ro	Changwon City	Seongsan District	National Route 77 overlap
Jangbok Tunnel	장복터널		Changwon City	Seongsan District	National Route 77 overlap Approximately 840m
Jangbok Tunnel			Changwon City	Jinhae District	National Route 77 overlap Approximately 840m
Jangbok-ro IS	장복로사거리	Jangboksan-gil	Changwon City	Jinhae District	National Route 77 overlap
Gamanigol IS	가마니골삼거리	Yeojwacheon-ro	Changwon City	Jinhae District	National Route 77 overlap
Citizen Hall IS	시민회관사거리		Changwon City	Jinhae District	National Route 77 overlap
Jinhae Overpass	진해고가교	Yeojwa-ro	Changwon City	Jinhae District	National Route 77 overlap
Yeojwa Overpass	여좌고가교		Changwon City	Jinhae District	National Route 77 overlap
Gyeonghwa Overpass	경화고가교	Taebaek-ro; Taebaekseo-ro	Changwon City	Jinhae District	National Route 77 overlap
Saemaeul IS	새마을사거리	Jocheon-ro; Jinhae-daero 624beon-gil	Changwon City	Jinhae District	National Route 77 overlap
Gyeonghwa Station (Gyeonghwa Station IS)	경화역 (경화역삼거리)	Gyeonghwa-ro	Changwon City	Jinhae District	National Route 77 overlap
Junganggo IS	중앙고삼거리	Gyeonghwasijang-ro	Changwon City	Jinhae District	National Route 77 overlap
Chamber of Commerce IS	상공회의소삼거리	Jinhae-daero 728beon-gil	Changwon City	Jinhae District	National Route 77 overlap
3rd Square	3호광장	National Route 25 (Haewon-ro)	Changwon City	Jinhae District	National Route 77 overlap
Dolri IS Seok-dong Community Center	돌리사거리 석동주민센터	Dolli-ro; Jinhae-daero 776beon-gil	Changwon City	Jinhae District	National Route 77 overlap
Jinhae Police Station (Police Station IS)	진해경찰서 (경찰서삼거리)		Changwon City	Jinhae District	National Route 77 overlap
Manrideul IS	만리들사거리	Seokdong-ro	Changwon City	Jinhae District	National Route 77 overlap
Naengcheon IS	냉천사거리	Naengcheon-ro	Changwon City	Jinhae District	National Route 77 overlap
Jaeun Bridge IS	자은교사거리	Jaeun-ro	Changwon City	Jinhae District	National Route 77 overlap
Haegun Apartment IS	해군아파트사거리	Deoksan-ro	Changwon City	Jinhae District	National Route 77 overlap
Jaeunbondong IS	자은본동사거리	Jinhae-daero 975beon-gil	Changwon City	Jinhae District	National Route 77 overlap
Pungho Elementary School IS	풍호초등교사거리	Pungho-ro	Changwon City	Jinhae District	National Route 77 overlap
Pungho IS (Pungho Overpass)	풍호사거리 (풍호고가교)	Cheonja-ro	Changwon City	Jinhae District	National Route 77 overlap
Jinhae-gu Office	진해구청		Changwon City	Jinhae District	National Route 77 overlap
Daebalryeong (Mannamui Square)	대발령 (만남의광장)		Changwon City	Jinhae District	National Route 77 overlap
Daebalryeong IS	대발령삼거리	Myeongje-ro	Changwon City	Jinhae District	National Route 77 overlap
Eoeun IS	어은삼거리	Eoeun-ro	Changwon City	Jinhae District	National Route 77 overlap
Cheonja IS	천자 교차로	Ungcheon-ro	Changwon City	Jinhae District	National Route 77 overlap
Ungdong IC	웅동 나들목	National Route 58; Namyeong-ro	Changwon City	Jinhae District	National Route 77 overlap
Daejangcheon Bridge	대장천교		Changwon City	Jinhae District	National Route 77 overlap
Uigok IS	의곡 교차로	Bobae-ro	Changwon City	Jinhae District	National Route 77 overlap
Songgok IS	송곡삼거리	Ancheong-ro	Changwon City	Jinhae District	National Route 77 overlap
Yongwontaekji	용원택지	Angol-ro	Changwon City	Jinhae District	National Route 77 overlap
Hoeyagol IS	회야골삼거리	Yongwonbuk-ro	Changwon City	Jinhae District	National Route 77 overlap
Yongjae IS	용재삼거리	Yongwondong-ro	Changwon City	Jinhae District	National Route 77 overlap
Yongwon IS	용원삼거리	Mangeum-ro	Changwon City	Jinhae District	National Route 77 overlap
Noksong Bridge	녹송교		Changwon City	Jinhae District	National Route 77 overlap Continuation into Busan

=== Busan ===
Name	Hangul name	Connection	Location		Note
Noksong Bridge	녹송교		Busan	Gangseo District	South Gyeongsang Province - Busan border line National Route 77 overlap
Noksong Overpass	녹송육교	Prefectural Route 58 (Garak-daero)	Busan	Gangseo District	National Route 77 overlap
Sanyang IS	산양삼거리	Noksanhwajeon-ro	Busan	Gangseo District	National Route 77 overlap
Bonnoksan IS	본녹산삼거리	Hwajeonsaneop-daero	Busan	Gangseo District	National Route 77 overlap
Nokmyeong Elementary School Noksan Middle School	녹명초등학교 녹산중학교		Busan	Gangseo District	National Route 77 overlap
Seongsan IS	성산삼거리	Prefectural Route 58 (Saenggong-ro)	Busan	Gangseo District	National Route 77 overlap
Noksan Bridge Noksan 2nd Bridge Busan Gangseo Police Station	녹산교 녹산제2교 부산강서경찰서		Busan	Gangseo District	National Route 77 overlap
Cheongnyangsa Entrance	청량사어귀	Jedo-ro	Busan	Gangseo District	National Route 77 overlap
Gyeongil Middle School	경일중학교입구	Yeonggang-gil; Nakdongnam-ro 1013beon-gil	Busan	Gangseo District	National Route 77 overlap
Myeongji IC	명지 나들목	Prefectural Route 31 (Gonghang-ro); Renault samsung-daero	Busan	Gangseo District	National Route 77 overlap
Eulsuk-do Service Area	을숙도휴게소		Busan	Saha District	National Route 77 overlap
Nakdonggang Estuary Bank	낙동강하굿둑		Busan	Saha District	National Route 77 overlap
Hagu Dam IS	하구둑 교차로	Gangbyeon-daero	Busan	Saha District	National Route 77 overlap
Hadan Station	하단역		Busan	Saha District	National Route 77 overlap
Hadan IS	하단 교차로	Nakdong-daero; Seunghak-ro; Hasinjungang-ro	Busan	Saha District	National Route 77 overlap
Dangni Station	당리역		Busan	Saha District	National Route 77 overlap
(Saha District Office Entrance)	(사하구청입구)	Nakdong-daero 398beon-gil	Busan	Saha District	National Route 77 overlap
Dangni Community Center IS	당리주민센타사거리	Dadae-ro; Nakdong-daero 372beon-gil	Busan	Saha District	National Route 77 overlap
Saha Station	사하역		Busan	Saha District	National Route 77 overlap
Saha Elementary IS (Saha Elementary School)	사하초등삼거리 (사하초등학교)	Jangpyeong-ro	Busan	Saha District	National Route 77 overlap
Goejeong IS (Goejeong Station)	괴정사거리 (괴정역)	Saha-ro; Nakdong-daero 216beon-gil	Busan	Saha District	National Route 77 overlap
Goejeong Elementary School Daeti Station	괴정초등학교 대티역		Busan	Saha District	National Route 77 overlap
Daeti Tunnel	대티터널		Busan	Saha District	National Route 77 overlap Approximately 401m
Daeti Tunnel			Busan	Seo District	National Route 77 overlap Approximately 401m
Seodaesin IS (Seodaesin Station)	서대신사거리 (서대신역)	Daeyeong-ro; Daeti-ro; Gudeok-ro 321beon-gil	Busan	Seo District	National Route 77 overlap
Busan Gudeok Stadium	구덕운동장	Kkonmaeul-ro	Busan	Seo District	National Route 77 overlap
Gudeok Stadium IS	구덕운동장삼거리	Mangyang-ro	Busan	Seo District	National Route 77 overlap
Dongdaesin IS (Dongdaesin Station)	동대신사거리 (동대신역)	Daeyeong-ro	Busan	Seo District	National Route 77 overlap
Buyong IS	부용사거리	Buyong-ro	Busan	Seo District	National Route 77 overlap
Dong-a University Bumin Campus	동아대학교 부민캠퍼스		Busan	Seo District	National Route 77 overlap
Bumin IS	부민사거리	Daecheong-ro; Imsisudoginyeom-ro	Busan	Seo District	National Route 77 overlap
Toseong Station Pusan National University Hospital	토성역 부산대학교병원		Busan	Seo District	National Route 77 overlap
Toseong-dong Station	토성동역앞	Kkachigogae-ro	Busan	Seo District	National Route 77 overlap
Chungmu IS	충무 교차로	Chungmu-daero; Jagalchi-ro	Busan	Seo District	National Route 77 overlap
Jagalchi IS (Jagalchi Station)	자갈치 교차로 (자갈치역)	Bosu-daero; Jagalchi-ro 15beon-gil	Busan	Seo District	National Route 77 overlap
Jagalchi IS (Jagalchi Station)		Bosu-daero; Jagalchi-ro 15beon-gil	Busan	Jung District	National Route 77 overlap
Nampo IS	남포사거리	Junggu-ro; Jagalchi-ro 37beon-gil	Busan	Jung District	National Route 77 overlap
Nampo Station	남포역		Busan	Jung District	National Route 77 overlap
Old City Hall IS	옛시청 교차로 (옛시청사거리)	National Route 7 (Jungang-daero); Taejong-ro	Busan	Jung District	National Route 77 overlap Terminus
