= Local Route 30 (South Korea) =

Road in South Korea

State-Funded Local Highway 30
- 국가지원지방도 제30호선
- Sacheon-Daegu Line 사천 ~ 대구선

Route information
- Length: 142.4 km (88.5 mi)
- Existed: 19 July 1996–present

Major junctions
- South end: Sacheon-eup, Sacheon, South Gyeongsang
- North end: Naedang-dong, Seo District, Daegu

Location
- Country: South Korea

Highway system
- Highway systems of South Korea; Expressways; National; Local

Local Route 30 Sacheon–Daegu Line (Korean: 국가지원지방도 제30호선 사천 ~ 대구선) is a local route of South Korea that connects Sacheon, South Gyeongsang Province to Seo District, Daegu.

== History ==
The route was originally planned in 1994 as part of an extension of National Route 30 from Daegu to Chaewon, but due to a lack of funding, the route was instead designated as a state-funded local route on 19 July 1996. In 2008, the route was extended to Sacheon.

== Stopovers ==
South Gyeongsang Province

- Sacheon - Jinju - Goseong County - Jinju - Haman County - Changwon - Changnyeong County - Miryang

North Gyeongsang Province

- Cheongdo County

Daegu

- Dalseong County - Suseong District - Nam District - Seo District

== Major intersections ==
- (■): Motorway

IS: Intersection, IC: Interchange

=== South Gyeongsang Province ===
Name	Hangul name	Connection	Location		Note
Suseok IS	수석삼거리	National Route 3 (Sacheon-daero)	Sacheon City	Sacheon-eup	Terminus
Seongdang IS	성당사거리	Jinsam-ro	Sacheon City	Sacheon-eup	
No name	(이름 없음)	Sacheoneupseong-ro	Sacheon City	Sacheon-eup	
Sacheon Public Stadium	사천공설운동장		Sacheon City	Sacheon-eup	
No name	(이름 없음)	Prefectural Route 1002 (Duryang-ro)	Sacheon City	Sacheon-eup	Prefectural Route 1002 overlap
Banggok IS	방곡 교차로	National Route 33 (Sangjeong-daero)	Sacheon City	Sacheon-eup	Prefectural Route 1002 overlap
Gugye Seowon	구계서원		Sacheon City	Sacheon-eup	Prefectural Route 1002 overlap
Doljanggogae	돌장고개		Sacheon City	Sacheon-eup	Prefectural Route 1002 overlap
Doljanggogae			Jinju City	Geumgok-myeon	Prefectural Route 1002 overlap
Geumgok Bus Stop	금곡정류소	Prefectural Route 1009 (Worasan-ro)	Jinju City	Geumgok-myeon	Prefectural Route 1002, 1009 overlap
Yeongo Bridge	영오교		Jinju City	Geumgok-myeon	Prefectural Route 1002, 1009 overlap
Yeongo Bridge			Goseong County	Yeongo-myeon	Prefectural Route 1002, 1009 overlap
Yeonhwasan IC (Yeongo IS)	연화산 나들목 (영오 교차로)	Tongyeong-Daejeon Expressway	Goseong County	Yeongo-myeon	Prefectural Route 1002, 1009 overlap
Oseo IS	오서 교차로	Prefectural Route 1009 (Daega-ro)	Goseong County	Yeongo-myeon	Prefectural Route 1002, 1009 overlap
Yeongo Elementary School Seonggok Bridge Yeongo Middle School	영오초등학교 성곡교 영오중학교		Goseong County	Yeongo-myeon	Prefectural Route 1002 overlap
Yeongo IS	영오사거리	Prefectural Route 1007 (Okcheon-ro)	Goseong County	Yeongo-myeon	Prefectural Route 1002 overlap
Yangsan Bridge	양산교		Goseong County	Yeongo-myeon	Prefectural Route 1002 overlap
Yangsan Bridge			Goseong County	Gaecheon-myeon	Prefectural Route 1002 overlap
(Gacheon-ri)	(가천리)	Prefectural Route 1037 (Ilsa-ro)	Goseong County	Gaecheon-myeon	Prefectural Route 1002 overlap
Cheonggwang Bridge	청광교		Goseong County	Gaecheon-myeon	Prefectural Route 1002 overlap
Cheonggwang IS	청광사거리	Prefectural Route 1002 (Yeonghwa-ro); Cheonggwang-ro	Goseong County	Gaecheon-myeon	Prefectural Route 1002 overlap
Nadong Bridge	나동교		Goseong County	Gaecheon-myeon	
Ibangseong IS	이반성 교차로	National Route 2 (Jinma-daero)	Jinju City	Ibangseong-myeon	
Gasan Bridge Ibangseong Middle School (Closed) Ibangseong-myeon Office Ibangseong Elementary School Jeongsu Branch (Closed)	가산교 이반성중학교(폐교) 이반성면사무소 이반성초등학교 이반성초등학교 정수분교(폐교)		Jinju City	Ibangseong-myeon	
(Pyeongchon Station Entrance)	(평촌역입구)	Bupyeong-gil	Jinju City	Ibangseong-myeon	
Jangpyeong Bridge Eoksiryeong 1 Bridge	장평교 억시령1교		Jinju City	Ibangseong-myeon	
Eoksiryeong	억시령		Jinju City	Ibangseong-myeon	
Eoksiryeong			Haman County	Gunbuk-myeon	
Eoksiryeong 2 Bridge	억시령2교		Haman County	Gunbuk-myeon	
Taesil IS	태실삼거리	Prefectural Route 1004 (Sagun-ro)	Haman County	Gunbuk-myeon	Prefectural Route 1004 overlap
Wonbuk station Seosan Seowon	원북역 서산서원		Haman County	Gunbuk-myeon	Prefectural Route 1004 overlap
Harim IS	하림삼거리	Sambang-ro	Haman County	Gunbuk-myeon	Prefectural Route 1004 overlap
Deokdae Bridge Yuam Bridge Kunbuk High School Kunbuk Middle School	덕대교 유암교 군북고등학교 군북중학교		Haman County	Gunbuk-myeon	Prefectural Route 1004 overlap
Gunbuk Station IS	군북역사거리	National Route 79; Prefectural Route 1029 (Hamma-daero); Jidu 2-gil	Haman County	Gunbuk-myeon	National Route 79, Prefectural Route 1004, 1029 overlap
Jungam IS	중암삼거리	Prefectural Route 1029 (Uisansamil-ro)	Haman County	Gunbuk-myeon	National Route 79, Prefectural Route 1004, 1029 overlap
Bongrim IS	봉림삼거리	Bongsu-ro	Haman County	Gunbuk-myeon	National Route 79, Prefectural Route 1004 overlap
Sopo IS	소포삼거리	Sopo 5-gil	Haman County	Gunbuk-myeon	National Route 79, Prefectural Route 1004 overlap
Odang IS	오당삼거리	Hyeonpo-ro	Haman County	Gunbuk-myeon	National Route 79, Prefectural Route 1004 overlap
Gaya Bridge	가야교		Haman County	Gaya-eup	National Route 79, Prefectural Route 1004 overlap
Haman-gun Forestry Cooperative	함안군산림조합	National Route 79 (Gaya-ro)	Haman County	Gaya-eup	National Route 79, Prefectural Route 1004 overlap
Gaya IS	가야사거리	Haman-daero; Gaya-ro	Haman County	Gaya-eup	National Route 79, Prefectural Route 1004 overlap
Hamju Bridge	함주교 남단	National Route 79; Prefectural Route 67; Prefectural Route 1011 (Hamma-daero)	Haman County	Gaya-eup	National Route 79, Prefectural Route 67, 1004 overlap
Haman Intercity Bus Terminal	함안시외버스터미널		Haman County	Gaya-eup	National Route 79, Prefectural Route 67, 1004 overlap
Gwangbok IS	광복 교차로	National Route 79 (Jinham-ro)	Haman County	Gaya-eup	National Route 79, Prefectural Route 67, 1004 overlap
Sinhaman Bridge Songjeong Overpass	신함안교 송정육교		Haman County	Gaya-eup	Prefectural Route 67, 1004 overlap
Sinhaman Bridge Songjeong Overpass			Haman County	Sanin-myeon	Prefectural Route 67, 1004 overlap
Sanin IS	산인삼거리	Prefectural Route 1021 (Gaya-ro)	Haman County	Sanin-myeon	Prefectural Route 67, 1004, 1021 overlap
Ipgok Railway Bridge	입곡과선교		Haman County	Sanin-myeon	Prefectural Route 67, 1004, 1021 overlap
Ipgok IS	입곡삼거리	Ipgokgongwon-gil	Haman County	Sanin-myeon	Prefectural Route 67, 1004, 1021 overlap
Sinmaecheon Bridge	신매천교		Haman County	Sanin-myeon	Prefectural Route 67, 1004, 1021 overlap
Munam IS	문암삼거리	Prefectural Route 1021 (Seongsan-ro)	Haman County	Sanin-myeon	Prefectural Route 67, 1004, 1021 overlap
Sinsan Bridge	신산교		Haman County	Sanin-myeon	Prefectural Route 67, 1004 overlap
Sanik IS	산익삼거리	Sanik-gil	Haman County	Sanin-myeon	Prefectural Route 67, 1004 overlap
Sindang IS	신당삼거리	Sinsan-ro	Haman County	Sanin-myeon	Prefectural Route 67, 1004 overlap
Sindanggogae	신당고개		Haman County	Sanin-myeon	Prefectural Route 67, 1004 overlap
Sindanggogae			Changwon City	Masanhoewon District Naeseo-eup	Prefectural Route 67, 1004 overlap
Masan Jeil High School	마산제일고등학교		Changwon City	Masanhoewon District Naeseo-eup	Prefectural Route 67, 1004 overlap
Jukam IS	죽암삼거리		Changwon City	Masanhoewon District Naeseo-eup	Prefectural Route 67, 1004 overlap
Masan University Jukam Bridge	마산대학교 죽암교		Changwon City	Masanhoewon District Naeseo-eup	Prefectural Route 67, 1004 overlap
Naeseo IC (Agriculture Market IS)	내서 나들목 (농산물시장 교차로)	Jungbu Naeryuk Expressway; Namhae Expressway Branch 1 Yutongdanji-ro	Changwon City	Masanhoewon District Naeseo-eup	Prefectural Route 67, 1004 overlap
North Jungri Bridge	중리교 북단	Prefectural Route 67 (Gwangnyeocheonseo-ro)	Changwon City	Masanhoewon District Naeseo-eup	Prefectural Route 67, 1004 overlap
Jungri Bridge	중리교		Changwon City	Masanhoewon District Naeseo-eup	Prefectural Route 1004 overlap
Jung-ri Station IS (Jung-ri Station)	중리역 교차로 (중리역)	Jungnigongdan-ro	Changwon City	Masanhoewon District Naeseo-eup	Prefectural Route 1004 overlap
Majae Bridge	마재교		Changwon City	Masanhoewon District	
Majaegogae IS	마재고개삼거리	Howon-ro	Changwon City	Masanhoewon District	
Ducheok Bridge Naeseo Elementary School	두척교 내서초등학교		Changwon City	Masanhoewon District	
West Masan IC (West Masan IC IS)	서마산 나들목 (서마산IC사거리)	Namhae Expressway Branch 1 Bukseong-ro	Changwon City	Masanhoewon District	
Seokcheon 3 Bridge	석천3교	Namhae Expressway Branch 1 Seokcheonbuk 2-gil	Changwon City	Masanhoewon District	Connected with West Masan IC
Seokjeon Bridge IS	석전교 교차로	National Route 14 (3.15-ro)	Changwon City	Masanhoewon District	National Route 14, National Route 79 overlap
Masan Station	마산역앞	Masannyeokgwangjang-ro; Yangdeok-ro	Changwon City	Masanhoewon District	National Route 14, National Route 79 overlap
Masan City Bus Terminal	마산시외버스터미널		Changwon City	Masanhoewon District	National Route 14, National Route 79 overlap
East Masan IC	동마산 나들목	Namhae Expressway Branch 1	Changwon City	Masanhoewon District	National Route 14, National Route 79 overlap
Changwon Overpass	창원육교		Changwon City	Masanhoewon District	National Route 14, National Route 79 overlap
Changwon Overpass	창원육교		Changwon City	Uichang District	National Route 14, National Route 79 overlap
Sogye Square	소계광장	National Route 79 (Jeongnyeol-daero)	Changwon City	Uichang District	National Route 14, National Route 79 overlap
Changwon Station IS (Changwon Station Express bus stop)	창원역사거리 (창원역시외고속버스정류소)	Uichang-daero 62beon-gil	Changwon City	Uichang District	National Route 14 overlap
Changwon Station IS	창원역삼거리	Sahwa-ro	Changwon City	Uichang District	National Route 14 overlap
Seosang IS	서상삼거리	Namsan-ro	Changwon City	Uichang District	National Route 14 overlap
Dongjeong IS	동정삼거리	Seosang-ro	Changwon City	Uichang District	National Route 14 overlap
Uichang IS	의창사거리	Cheonju-ro; Paryong-ro	Changwon City	Uichang District	National Route 14 overlap
Samgusa IS	삼구사사거리	Pyeongsan-ro; Uichang-daero 261beon-gil	Changwon City	Uichang District	National Route 14 overlap
Dogye Square	도계광장	Woni-daero	Changwon City	Uichang District	National Route 14 overlap
Namsan IC	남산 나들목	National Route 25 (Haewon-ro); Uichang-daero	Changwon City	Uichang District Dong-eup	National Route 14, National Route 25 overlap
Deoksan IS	덕산 교차로	Uichang-daero	Changwon City	Uichang District Dong-eup	National Route 14, National Route 25 overlap
Deokcheon IS	덕천 교차로	National Route 14; National Route 25 (Haewon-ro)	Changwon City	Uichang District Dong-eup	National Route 14, National Route 25 overlap
Dong-eup Office	동읍사무소		Changwon City	Uichang District Dong-eup	
Front of Dong-eup Office	동읍사무소앞	Sinbang-ro	Changwon City	Uichang District Dong-eup	
Sinbang Elementary School Changwondong Middle School Bonggang Elementary School	신방초등학교 창원동중학교 봉강초등학교		Changwon City	Uichang District Dong-eup	
Bonggang IS	봉강삼거리	Bongganggasul-ro	Changwon City	Uichang District Dong-eup	
Bonpo IS	본포 교차로	Prefectural Route 60 (Nakdong-ro); Sinchonbonpo-ro	Changwon City	Uichang District Dong-eup	
Bongye Bridge	본계교		Changwon City	Uichang District Dong-eup	
South Bonpo Bridge	본포교 남단	Daesanbuk-ro	Changwon City	Uichang District Dong-eup	
Bonpo Bridge	본포교		Changwon City	Uichang District Dong-eup	
Bonpo Bridge			Changnyeong County	Bugok-myeon	
No name	(이름 없음)	Prefectural Route 1022 (Nakdong-ro)	Changnyeong County	Bugok-myeon	Prefectural Route 1022 overlap
No name	(이름 없음)	Prefectural Route 1022 (Choha-ro)	Changnyeong County	Bugok-myeon	Prefectural Route 1022 overlap
Ingyo IS	인교사거리	Prefectural Route 1008 (Oncheon-ro)	Changnyeong County	Bugok-myeon	
Moro IS	모로삼거리	Sinyeon-ro	Miryang City	Muan-myeon	
Wonwon Bridge	원원교		Miryang City	Muan-myeon	
Muan Nonghyup Bank	무안농협	Prefectural Route 1080 (Samyeongdaesasaengga-ro)	Miryang City	Muan-myeon	Prefectural Route 1080 overlap
Muan Elementary School	무안초등학교		Miryang City	Muan-myeon	Prefectural Route 1080 overlap
Sinbeop IS	신법삼거리	Prefectural Route 1080 (Muan-ro)	Miryang City	Muan-myeon	Prefectural Route 1080 overlap
Samtae IS	삼태삼거리	Samhwa-gil	Miryang City	Muan-myeon	
Samtae Bridge Naejin Bridge	삼태교 내진교		Miryang City	Muan-myeon	
Dongsan IS	동산삼거리	National Route 24 (Changmil-ro)	Miryang City	Muan-myeon	National Route 24 overlap
No name	(이름 없음)	National Route 24 (Changmil-ro)	Miryang City	Muan-myeon	National Route 24 overlap
Yogo Reservoir	요고저수지		Miryang City	Muan-myeon	One-lane
Yojeonjae	요전재		Miryang City	Muan-myeon	Under construction Continuation into North Gyeongsang Province

=== North Gyeongsang Province ===
Name	Hangul name	Connection	Location		Note
Yojeonjae	요전재		Cheongdo County	Gangnam-myeon	Under construction South Gyeongsang Province - North Gyeongsang Province border line
Hambak-ri	함박리		Cheongdo County	Gangnam-myeon	One-lane
Daesan Elementary School (Closed)	대산초등학교(폐교)		Cheongdo County	Gangnam-myeon	One-lane
Oksan 2 Bridge Oksan 1 Bridge	옥산2교 옥산1교		Cheongdo County	Gangnam-myeon	One-lane
(South Chodong Bridge)	(초동교 남단)	Prefectural Route 902 (Hanjae-ro)	Cheongdo County	Gangnam-myeon	Prefectural Route 902 overlap
Chodong Bridge	초동교		Cheongdo County	Gangnam-myeon	Prefectural Route 902 overlap
Sindang Overpass	신당육교	National Route 20 (Cheongnyeo-ro); Prefectural Route 902 (Heolti-ro)	Cheongdo County	Gangnam-myeon	Prefectural Route 902 overlap
Gangnam Elementary School Gangnam-myeon Office	각남초등학교 각남면사무소		Cheongdo County	Gangnam-myeon	
Chilseong IS	칠성사거리	National Route 20 (Cheongnyeo-ro); Gangnam-ro	Cheongdo County	Gangnam-myeon	
Iseo Bridge	이서교		Cheongdo County	Gangnam-myeon	
Iseo Bridge			Cheongdo County	Iseo-myeon	
Singi IS	신기 교차로	Haksantopyeong-gil; Haksan 1-gil	Cheongdo County	Iseo-myeon	
Iseo-myeon Office	이서면사무소		Cheongdo County	Iseo-myeon	
Mosan IS	모산 교차로	Borimi-gil	Cheongdo County	Iseo-myeon	
Golan IS	골안 교차로	Sangdang-gil	Cheongdo County	Iseo-myeon	
Saetbyeol IS	샛별 교차로	Yeonji-ro	Cheongdo County	Iseo-myeon	
Sinchon IS	신촌 교차로	Sinchon-gil	Cheongdo County	Iseo-myeon	
Cheongdo Museum (Former Chilgok Elementary School)	청도박물관 (구 칠곡초등학교)		Cheongdo County	Iseo-myeon	
Mokrim IS	목림 교차로	Daegok-gil	Cheongdo County	Iseo-myeon	
Paljoryeong 2 Bridge	팔조령2교		Cheongdo County	Iseo-myeon	South-bound Only
Paljoryeong Bridge	팔조령교		Cheongdo County	Iseo-myeon	
Paljoryeong Tunnel	팔조령터널		Cheongdo County	Iseo-myeon	Right tunnel: Approximately 690m Left tunnel: Approximately 716m Continuation into Daegu

=== Daegu ===
Name	Hangul name	Connection	Location		Note
Paljoryeong Tunnel	팔조령터널		Dalseong County	Gachang-myeon	Right tunnel: Approximately 690m Left tunnel: Approximately 716m North Gyeongsang Province - Daegu border line
Jimteo IS	짐터 교차로	Gachang-ro 10-gil	Dalseong County	Gachang-myeon	
Samsan Bridge	삼산교		Dalseong County	Gachang-myeon	
Sujeom IS	수점 교차로	Gachang-ro 57-gil Gachang-ro 58-gil	Dalseong County	Gachang-myeon	
Okbun Bridge Gachang Sports Park	옥분교 가창체육공원		Dalseong County	Gachang-myeon	
Daeil IS	대일 교차로	Gachang-ro 123-gil Gachang-ro 126-gil	Dalseong County	Gachang-myeon	
Daeil Bridge Gachang Elementary School Gachang Middle School Spavalley Hancheon Bridge Naengcheon Bridge Gachang Tungsten Town Naengcheon CC	대일교 가창초등학교 가창중학교 스파밸리 한천교 냉천교 가창중석타운 냉천CC		Dalseong County	Gachang-myeon	
Gachang Dam Entrance IS	가창댐입구 교차로	Heolti-ro	Dalseong County	Gachang-myeon	
Daejung Technical High School Yonggye Bridge	대중금속공업고등학교 용계교		Dalseong County	Gachang-myeon	
(Gachang Post Office)	(가창우체국)	Sincheon-daero; Gachang-ro	Dalseong County	Gachang-myeon	
Gachang-myeon Office	가창면사무소		Dalseong County	Gachang-myeon	
Gachang Bridge	가창교		Dalseong County	Gachang-myeon	
Gachang Bridge			Daegu	Suseong District	
Padong Bridge IS	파동교네거리	Padong-ro 16-gil	Daegu	Suseong District	
Pa-dong Community Center	파동주민센터		Daegu	Suseong District	
Shinsegae Gas Station IS	신세계주유소앞 교차로	Padong-ro 30-gil	Daegu	Suseong District	
Suseongmot IS	수성못오거리	Suseong-ro; Yonghak-ro; Padong-ro 51-gil	Daegu	Suseong District	
(East Dusan Bridge)	(두산교 동단)	Muhak-ro	Daegu	Suseong District	
(East Sangdong Bridge)	(상동교 동단)	Sanghwa-ro; Sincheondong-ro	Daegu	Suseong District	
Sangdong Bridge	상동교		Daegu	Suseong District	
Sangdong Bridge			Daegu	Nam District	
(West Sangdong Bridge)	(상동교 서단)	Sincheon-daero; Apsansunhwan-ro	Daegu	Nam District	
Jungdong Bridge Underpass	중동교지하차도	Daedeok-ro; Cheongsu-ro; Jungang-daero 22-gil	Daegu	Nam District	
No name	(이름 없음)	Sincheon-daero	Daegu	Nam District	
No name	(이름 없음)	Daebong-ro	Daegu	Nam District	
Nam-gu Office IS	남구청네거리	Icheon-ro	Daegu	Nam District	
Yeungnam University Hospital IS	영대병원네거리	Jungang-daero; Myeongdeoksijang-gil	Daegu	Nam District	
Yeungnam University Hospital Station	영대병원역		Daegu	Nam District	
Myeongdeok Market IS	명덕시장 교차로	Daemyeong-ro 57-gil Daemyeong-ro 58-gil	Daegu	Nam District	
Nambu Police Station (Daegu Nambu Police Station)	남부경찰서 교차로 (대구남부경찰서)		Daegu	Nam District	
Work Camp IS	캠프워크 교차로	Jayu-gil	Daegu	Nam District	
Hyeonchungno Station	현충로역		Daegu	Nam District	
Apsan IS	앞산네거리	Hyeonchung-ro	Daegu	Nam District	
Anjirang IS	안지랑네거리	Duryugongwon-ro; Angol-gil; Keungol-gil; Daemyeong-ro 36-gil	Daegu	Nam District	
Anjirang station	안지랑역		Daegu	Nam District	
KT&G Daegu Home plus Namdaegu Daegu Daemyeong Elementary School	KT&G 대구본부 홈플러스 남대구점 대구대명초등학교	Anjirang-ro	Daegu	Nam District	
Daemyeong Station IS	대명역 교차로	Daemyeong-ro 13-gil Daemyeong-ro 14-gil	Daegu	Nam District	
Daegu Metropolitan City Facilities Management Corporation	대구광역시시설관리공단		Daegu	Nam District	
Seongdang IS (Seobu Bus Terminal Station) (Daegu Seobu Bus Terminal)	성당네거리 (서부정류장역) (대구서부정류장)	National Route 5 National Route 26 (Wolbae-ro)	Daegu	Nam District	National Route 5, National Route 26 overlap
Duribong IS	두리봉네거리	Daemyeongcheon-ro	Daegu	North:Dalseo District; South:Nam District	National Route 5, National Route 26 overlap
Duryu Park IS	두류공원네거리	Duryugongwon-ro; Seongdang-ro	Daegu	North:Dalseo District; South:Nam District	National Route 5, National Route 26 overlap
Duryu Stadium E-World Duryu Library	두류운동장 이월드 두류도서관		Daegu	North:Dalseo District; South:Nam District	National Route 5, National Route 26 overlap
No name	(이름 없음)	Yaoeeumakdang-ro	Daegu	North:Dalseo District; South:Nam District	National Route 5, National Route 26 overlap
Daegu Sinheung Elementary School	대구신흥초등학교		Daegu	North:Dalseo District; South:Nam District	National Route 5, National Route 26 overlap
Duryu IS (Duryu Station)	두류네거리 (두류역)	National Route 5 (Seodaegu-ro); National Route 30 (Dalgubeol-daero)	Daegu	Seo District	National Route 5, National Route 26 overlap Terminus

== See also ==
- Roads and expressways in South Korea
- Transportation in South Korea
