= National Route 79 (South Korea) =

Highway in South Korea

National Route 79
- 국도 제79호선

Route information
- Length: 111.6 km (69.3 mi)
- Existed: 25 August 2001–present

Major junctions
- South end: Uiryeong County, South Gyeongsang Province
- North end: Changnyeong County, South Gyeongsang Province

Location
- Country: South Korea

Highway system
- Highway systems of South Korea; Expressways; National; Local

National Route 79 is a national highway in South Korea connects Uiryeong County to Changnyeong County. It established on 25 August 2001.

== Main stopovers ==
South Gyeongsang Province

- Uiryeong County - Haman County - Changwon - Changnyeong County

== Major intersections ==
- (■): Motorway

IS: Intersection, IC: Interchange

Name	Hangul name	Connection	Location		Note
Baekya IS	백야오거리	National Route 20 (Uiryeong-daero) (Uihap-daero); Namgang-ro; Baeksan-ro	Uiryeong County	Uiryeong-eup	Terminus
Baekya Bridge	백야교		Uiryeong County	Uiryeong-eup	
Baekya Overpass	백야육교	Prefectural Route 1040 (Namgang-ro)	Uiryeong County	Uiryeong-eup	
Jeongam Bridge	정암교		Uiryeong County	Uiryeong-eup	
Jeongam Bridge			Haman County	Gunbuk-myeon	
Jeongam IS	정암삼거리	Wolchon-ro; Jeongju-ro	Haman County	Gunbuk-myeon	
Sado IS	사도사거리	Wolchon-ro; Wolchon 1-gil	Haman County	Gunbuk-myeon	
Gunbuk IC	군북 나들목	Namhae Expressway	Haman County	Gunbuk-myeon	
Yeomyeong IS	여명삼거리	Yeomyeong-ro	Haman County	Gunbuk-myeon	
Juknam Bridge	죽남교		Haman County	Gunbuk-myeon	
Gongdan IS	공단삼거리	Ojanggol-gil	Haman County	Gunbuk-myeon	
Ando IS	안도삼거리	Prefectural Route 1029 (Jangbaek-ro)	Haman County	Gunbuk-myeon	Prefectural Route 1029 overlap
Gunbuk Bus Terminal	군북버스터미널		Haman County	Gunbuk-myeon	Prefectural Route 1029 overlap
Gunbuk Station IS	군북역사거리	Prefectural Route 30; Prefectural Route 1004 (Sagun-ro); Jidu 2-gil	Haman County	Gunbuk-myeon	Prefectural Route 30, 1004, 1029 overlap
Jungam IS	중암삼거리	Prefectural Route 1029 (Uisansamil-ro)	Haman County	Gunbuk-myeon	Prefectural Route 30, 1004, 1029 overlap
Bongrim IS	봉림삼거리	Bongsu-ro	Haman County	Gunbuk-myeon	Prefectural Route 30, 1004 overlap
Sopo IS	소포삼거리	Sopo 5-gil	Haman County	Gunbuk-myeon	Prefectural Route 30, 1004 overlap
Odang IS	오당삼거리	Hyeonpo-ro	Haman County	Gunbuk-myeon	Prefectural Route 30, 1004 overlap
Gaya Bridge	가야교		Haman County	Gaya-eup	Prefectural Route 30, 1004 overlap
Haman-gun Forestry Cooperative	함안군산림조합	Prefectural Route 30; Prefectural Route 1004 (Hamma-daero)	Haman County	Gaya-eup	Prefectural Route 30, 1004 overlap
Gaya IS	가야사거리	Haman-daero; Gaya-ro	Haman County	Gaya-eup	
Hamju Bridge	함주교 남단	Prefectural Route 30; Prefectural Route 1004 (Hamma-daero); Prefectural Route 1011 (Haman-daero)	Haman County	Gaya-eup	Prefectural Route 30, 1004 overlap
Haman Intercity Bus Terminal	함안시외버스터미널		Haman County	Gaya-eup	Prefectural Route 30, 1004 overlap
Gwangbok IS	광복 교차로	Prefectural Route 30; Prefectural Route 1004 (Hamma-daero)	Haman County	Gaya-eup	Prefectural Route 30, 1004 overlap
Geomam Underpass	검암지하차도	Malsan-ro; Hageom-gil	Haman County	Gaya-eup	
Sanggeomam IS	상검암 교차로	Sanggeom-gil	Haman County	Gaya-eup	
Goesan IS	괴산 교차로	Hanjeolgol-gil	Haman County	Haman-myeon	
Haman Station	함안역		Haman County	Haman-myeon	
Bongseong 2 IS	봉성2 교차로	Prefectural Route 1021 (Seongsan-ro)	Haman County	Haman-myeon	Prefectural Route 1021 overlap
Bongseong 1 IS	봉성1 교차로	Haman-daero	Haman County	Haman-myeon	Prefectural Route 1021 overlap
Jangmyeong IS	장명 교차로	Gangmyeong 4-gil Gangmyeong 5-gil	Haman County	Haman-myeon	Prefectural Route 1021 overlap
Oeam 2 IS	외암2 교차로	Prefectural Route 1021 (Yeohang-ro)	Haman County	Yeohang-myeon	Prefectural Route 1021 overlap
Oeam 1 IS	외암1 교차로	Yeohang-ro	Haman County	Yeohang-myeon	
Dugok IS	두곡 교차로	Oeam-gil	Haman County	Yeohang-myeon	
Naegok IS	내곡 교차로	Naegokan-gil	Haman County	Yeohang-myeon	
Bonggok IS	봉곡 교차로	Naegok 1-gil Naegok 2-gil	Haman County	Yeohang-myeon	
Jingogae (Hanchi)	진고개 (한치)		Haman County	Yeohang-myeon	Prefectural Route 67 overlap
Jingogae (Hanchi)			Changwon City	Masanhappo District Jinbuk-myeon	Prefectural Route 67 overlap
Jeongdong Bridge	정동교	Jinbuksaneop-ro	Changwon City	Masanhappo District Jinbuk-myeon	Prefectural Route 67 overlap
Daehyeon IS	대현 교차로	Jinbuksaneop-ro; Daehyeon-gil; Jeonghyeongongdan-gil	Changwon City	Masanhappo District Jinbuk-myeon	Prefectural Route 67 overlap
Jungchon Bridge	중촌교		Changwon City	Masanhappo District Jinbuk-myeon	Prefectural Route 67 overlap
Gwijeong IS	귀정 교차로	Jinbuksaneop-ro; Gwijeong-gil	Changwon City	Masanhappo District Jinbuk-myeon	Prefectural Route 67 overlap
Chugok Bridge Chugok 1 Bridge Oechu Bridge	추곡교 추곡1교 외추교		Changwon City	Masanhappo District Jinbuk-myeon	Prefectural Route 67 overlap
Beteulsan Tunnel	베틀산터널		Changwon City	Masanhappo District Jinbuk-myeon	Prefectural Route 67 overlap Approximately 823m
Busan Bridge	부산교		Changwon City	Masanhappo District Jinbuk-myeon	Prefectural Route 67 overlap
Daepyeong IS (Daepyeong 3 Bridge)	대평 교차로 (대평3교)	Prefectural Route 1021 (Hakdong-ro); Jinbuksanchon-ro	Changwon City	Masanhappo District Jinbuk-myeon	Prefectural Route 67 overlap
Daepyeong 2 Bridge	대평2교		Changwon City	Masanhappo District Jinbuk-myeon	Prefectural Route 67 overlap
Jisan JCT	지산 분기점	National Route 2 National Route 14; National Route 77; Prefectural Route 67 (Namhaean-daero)	Changwon City	Masanhappo District Jinbuk-myeon	National Route 2, National Route 14, National Route 77 overlap Prefectural Route 67 overlap
Daepyeong IS	대평 교차로	Prefectural Route 1021 (Hakdong-ro)	Changwon City	Masanhappo District Jinbuk-myeon	National Route 2, National Route 14, National Route 77 overlap
Jindong IS	진동 교차로	National Route 77 (Jinbuksaneop-ro)	Changwon City	Masanhappo District Jinbuk-myeon	National Route 2, National Route 14, National Route 77 overlap
Daegokcheon Bridge Jindongcheon Bridge	덕곡천교 진동천교		Changwon City	Masanhappo District Jinbuk-myeon	National Route 2, National Route 14, National Route 77 overlap
Jindong IS	진동 교차로	Jinbuksaneop-ro	Changwon City	Masanhappo District Jinbuk-myeon	National Route 2, National Route 14, National Route 77 overlap
Jinbuk Tunnel	진북터널		Changwon City	Masanhappo District Jinbuk-myeon	
Jinbuk Tunnel			Changwon City	Mansanhappo District Jindong-myeon	
Taebong Bridge	태봉교		Changwon City	Mansanhappo District Jindong-myeon	National Route 2, National Route 14, National Route 77 overlap
Osan IS	오산 교차로	Osan 3-gil	Changwon City	Mansanhappo District Jindong-myeon	National Route 2, National Route 14, National Route 77 overlap
Taebong IS	태봉 교차로	Taebong 2-gil	Changwon City	Mansanhappo District Jindong-myeon	National Route 2, National Route 14, National Route 77 overlap
Dongjeon Tunnel Sindongjeon Tunnel	동전터널 신동전터널		Changwon City	Mansanhappo District Jindong-myeon	National Route 2, National Route 14, National Route 77 overlap Dongjeon Tunnel (Approximately 590m); Sindongjeon Tunnel (Approximately 1050m)
Dongjeon Tunnel Sindongjeon Tunnel			Changwon City	Mansanhappo District	National Route 2, National Route 14, National Route 77 overlap Dongjeon Tunnel (Approximately 590m); Sindongjeon Tunnel (Approximately 1050m)
Hyeondong JCT	현동 분기점	National Route 5	Changwon City	Mansanhappo District	National Route 2, National Route 5, National Route 14, National Route 77 overlap
Hyeondong IS	현동 교차로	National Route 2 National Route 5 National Route 77 (Gyeongnam-daero) (Namhaean-daero)	Changwon City	Mansanhappo District	National Route 2, National Route 5, National Route 14, National Route 77 overlap
No name	(이름 없음)	Muhak-ro	Changwon City	Mansanhappo District	National Route 14 overlap
Wolyeong Square Kyungnam University	월영광장 경남대학교	Gapo-ro; Kyungnam University Road; Haean-daero	Changwon City	Mansanhappo District	National Route 14 overlap
Banwol-dong Community Center	반월동주민센터		Changwon City	Mansanhappo District	National Route 14 overlap
Masanhappo-gu Office Masan Medical Center	마산합포구청 마산의료원		Changwon City	Mansanhappo District	National Route 14 overlap
Muhak Elementary School	무학초등학교		Changwon City	Mansanhappo District	National Route 14 overlap
Seoseong Square	서성광장	Seoseong-ro; Happo-ro	Changwon City	Mansanhappo District	National Route 14 overlap
No name	(이름 없음)	Bukseong-ro	Changwon City	Mansanhappo District	National Route 14 overlap
6th Square	6호광장	Buljonggeori-ro; Cheonhajangsa-ro; Heodang-ro	Changwon City	Mansanhappo District	National Route 14 overlap
No name	(이름 없음)	Muhak-ro	Changwon City	Masanhoewon District	National Route 14 overlap
Seokjeon Bridge IS	석전교 교차로	Prefectural Route 30 (Samho-ro)	Changwon City	Masanhoewon District	National Route 14 overlap Prefectural Route 30 overlap
Masan Station	마산역앞	Masannyeokgwangjang-ro; Yangdeok-ro	Changwon City	Masanhoewon District	National Route 14 overlap Prefectural Route 30 overlap
Masan City Bus Terminal	마산시외버스터미널		Changwon City	Masanhoewon District	National Route 14 overlap Prefectural Route 30 overlap
East Masan IC	동마산 나들목	Namhae Expressway Branch 1	Changwon City	Masanhoewon District	National Route 14 overlap Prefectural Route 30 overlap
Changwon Overpass	창원육교		Changwon City	Masanhoewon District	National Route 14 overlap Prefectural Route 30 overlap
Changwon Overpass			Changwon City	Uichang District	National Route 14 overlap Prefectural Route 30 overlap
Sogye Square	소계광장	National Route 14; Prefectural Route 30 (Uichang-daero)	Changwon City	Uichang District	National Route 14 overlap Prefectural Route 30 overlap
Sogye Overpass	소계육교	Geumgang-ro	Changwon City	Uichang District	
Uian IS	의안 교차로	Cheonju-ro	Changwon City	Uichang District	
Gulhyeon Tunnel	굴현터널		Changwon City	Uichang District	Approximately 335m
Gulhyeon Tunnel			Changwon City	Uichang District Buk-myeon	Approximately 335m
North Changwon IC (Hwacheon IS)	북창원 나들목 (화천 교차로)	Namhae Expressway; Cheonju-ro	Changwon City	Uichang District Buk-myeon	
Dongjeon IS	동전 교차로	Mudong-ro; Baegwol-ro	Changwon City	Uichang District Buk-myeon	
Masan IS	마산삼거리	Prefectural Route 60 (Sinchonbonpo-ro)	Changwon City	Uichang District Buk-myeon	
Under construction
Imhaejin IS	임해진삼거리	Prefectural Route 1022 (Nakdong-ro)	Changnyeong County	Bugok-myeon	
Onjeong IS	온정 교차로	Prefectural Route 1008 (Oncheon-ro)	Changnyeong County	Bugok-myeon	Prefectural Route 1008 overlap
Oncheon IS	온천사거리	Wonang-ro	Changnyeong County	Bugok-myeon	Prefectural Route 1008 overlap
Wonang IS	원앙삼거리	Gilgok-ro	Changnyeong County	Docheon-myeon	Prefectural Route 1008 overlap
Deokgok IS	덕곡삼거리	Nollideokgok-gil	Changnyeong County	Docheon-myeon	Prefectural Route 1008 overlap
Yeongsan IC Yeongsan IC IS	영산 나들목 영산IC 삼거리	Jungbu Naeryuk Expressway; Yeongsandocheon-ro	Changnyeong County	Yeongsan-myeon	Prefectural Route 1008 overlap
Yeonjimot	연지못		Changnyeong County	Yeongsan-myeon	Prefectural Route 1008 overlap
Yeongsan IS	영산사거리	Sinyeongsan-ro; Yeongsangyeseong-ro	Changnyeong County	Yeongsan-myeon	Prefectural Route 1008 overlap
Gyeseong IS	계성 교차로	National Route 5 (Geyongnam-daero)	Changnyeong County	Gyeseong-myeon	Prefectural Route 1008 overlap
Gyeseong IS	계성삼거리	Myeongriwolpyeong-gil	Changnyeong County	Gyeseong-myeon	Prefectural Route 1008 overlap
Bongsan IS	봉산삼거리	Bongsangwandong 1-ro	Changnyeong County	Gyeseong-myeon	Prefectural Route 1008 overlap
Jangma IS	장마삼거리	Gangri-gil	Changnyeong County	Jangma-myeon	Prefectural Route 1008 overlap
Gangri IS	강리삼거리	Namjijangma-ro	Changnyeong County	Jangma-myeon	Prefectural Route 1008 overlap
Hwayeong IS	화영삼거리	Changnyeongjangma-ro	Changnyeong County	Jangma-myeon	Prefectural Route 1008 overlap
Dongjeong IS	동정삼거리	Prefectural Route 1008 (Jangmagogok-ro)	Changnyeong County	Jangma-myeon	Prefectural Route 1008 overlap
Dongjeong Health Center	동정보건진료소		Changnyeong County	Jangma-myeon	
Gwangsanseodang	광산서당		Changnyeong County	Yueo-myeon	
Geoma IS	거마삼거리	Upoyueonong-ro	Changnyeong County	Yueo-myeon	
Yueo IS	유어삼거리	National Route 20; National Route 24; Prefectural Route 67; Prefectural Route 79 (Upo 1-daero)	Changnyeong County	Yueo-myeon	Terminus
