= Wonbuk station =

Railway station in South Korea

Coordinates: 35°14′0.95″N 128°19′35.14″E

Wonbuk station is a defunct railway station on the Gyeongjeon Line in South Korea.
