= Gupo Bridge =

Bridge in Busan, South Korea

Coordinates: 35.2056°N 128.9913°E

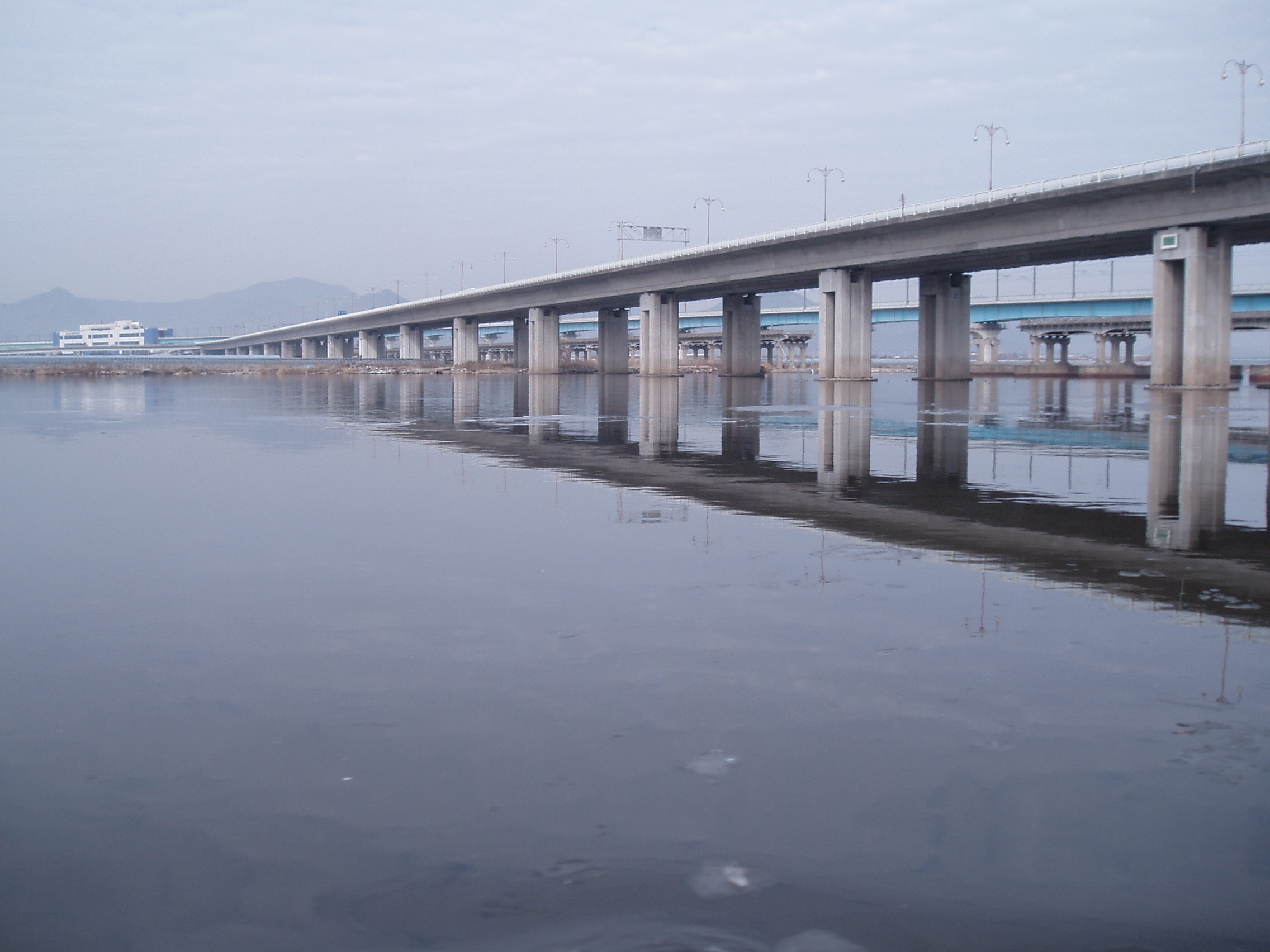

Korean name
- Hangul: 구포대교
- Hanja: 龜浦大橋
- RR: Gupo daegyo
- MR: Kup'o taegyo

Gupodaegyo is a bridge in Busan, South Korea. The bridge connects the districts of Gangseo District and Buk District. The bridge was completed in 1993.
