= Aphae Bridge =

Bridge in South Korea

Coordinates: 34.8314°N 126.3780°E

Aphae Bridge (in Korean: 압해대교; Hanja: 押海大橋) connects Mokpo and Aphae island of Sinan county of South Jeolla province, South Korea. The project was first set up in June, 2000 and the construction of the bridge was finalized in 2008. The whole bridge belongs to some part of national route 2 to cut down on discomforts by visiting Aphae area by ferries.

Another strength is close accessibility near to Seohaean expressway to give more comforts for visiting homes during national holidays such as Korean New Year's Day. In winter of 2008, the bridge initially opened to public on temporary basis for outdoor visitors.

South Jeolla province announced several development projects like building leisure business and landmass for shipbuilders to boost speculation. Because of public concerns, office officially registered the area as mandate area for permission of land deals.
