= Jinhae Gunhangje Festival =

Annual festival in Changwon, South Korea

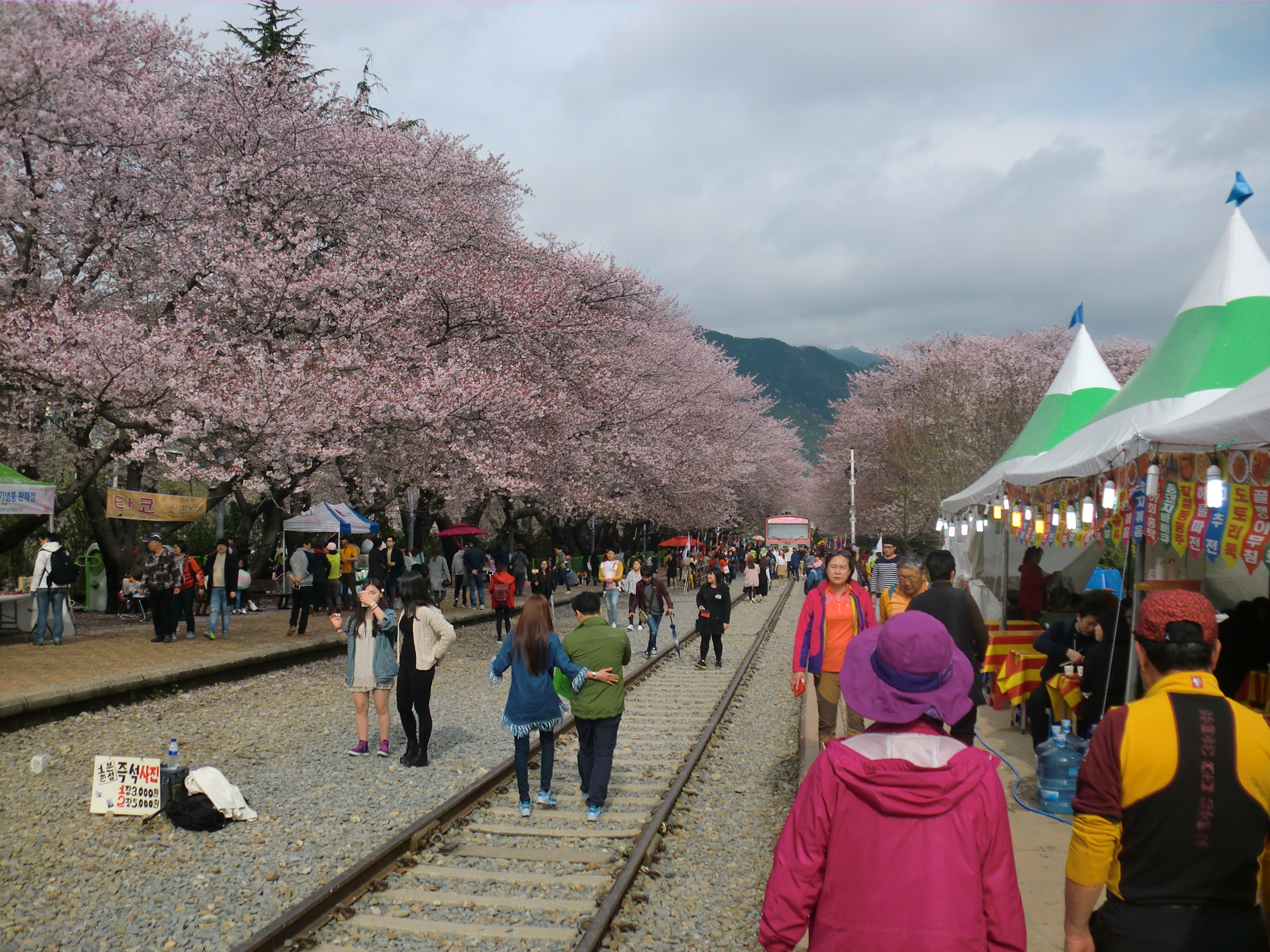
The festival in 2016

The Jinhae Gunhangje Festival (Korean: 진해군항제), also called Jinhae Cherry Blossom Festival, is a cherry blossom festival held in Jinhae District, Changwon, South Korea. It began in 1963 and is held annually in early April (for about 10 days from April 1st). It is also called Beotkkotjang (Cherry Blossom Market) because markets similar to five-day markets are formed on roads with cherry blossom trees.

In 1952, during the height of the Korean War, the first statue of Admiral Yi Sun-sin in Korea was erected at Bugwon Rotary and a memorial service was held, which became the beginning. Hosted by Jinhae City (currently hosted by Changwon City) and organized by the Yi Sun-sin Patriotic Spirit Promotion Association, various events are held in Jinhae City (currently Jinhae-gu) including Jungwon Rotary. In addition, the cherry blossom blooming status of four locations, including Jinhae Citizen's Hall (currently District Hall), Gyeonghwa Station, Jungwon Rotary, and Anmin Hill, is informed through the city's website and municipal administration promotional electronic billboards from 20 days before the festival until the end.

During this period, cherry blossoms are in full bloom at Yeojwacheon, Jinhaeru, and Jangboksan Park, and the Republic of Korea Naval Academy and parts of the Jinhae Naval Base, which are normally restricted areas for the general public, are also opened, making access possible for the general public.

In 2020, 2021, and 2022, the holding was suspended due to the aftermath of the COVID-19 pandemic.

== History ==
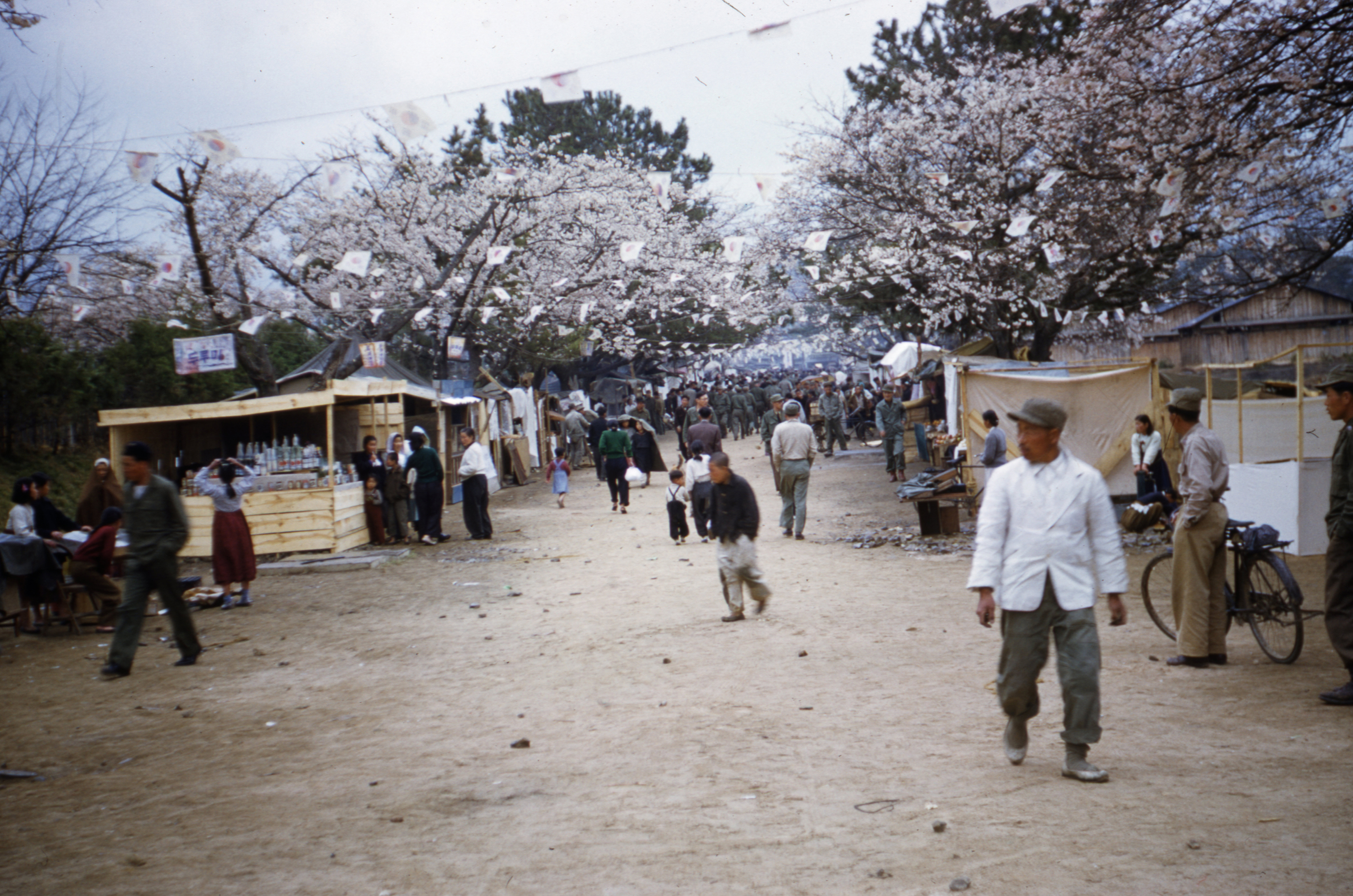
Cherry blossoms in Jinhae in 1952, before the festival was established

The Jinhae Gunhangje Festival began in 1963, prompted by the erection of Korea's first statue of Admiral Yi Sun-sin at Bugwon Rotary on April 13, 1952, and the subsequent memorial services held there. In the early days, the festival consisted entirely of holding a ritual at Bugwon Rotary where the statue of Admiral Yi Sun-sin stands. However, as the scale and content of the event grew and developed year after year, the Yi Sun-sin Patriotic Spirit Promotion Association was launched as an incorporated association in 1983 and has been organizing the Gunhangje events to this day. The Jinhae Gunhangje Festival has developed into a spring festival where visitors can enjoy cultural and artistic events, viewing events, and the Paldo (Eight Provinces) Folk Market alongside the beautiful cherry blossoms, while preserving its original purpose of honoring Admiral Yi's noble spirit of saving the country and promoting local culture and arts. However, in 2010, the event was significantly scaled down due to the sinking of the ROKS Cheonan. Major events, including the opening ceremony and the festival night, were completely canceled, and only exhibitions, including the Admiral Yi Sun-sin Victory March and the Admiral Yi Sun-sin Memorial Grand Ritual, were operated.

The 49th Jinhae Gunhangje Festival in 2011 Until 2010, the event was held from late March to early April to match the annual cherry blossom blooming season; however, Changwon City fixed the dates of the festival from April 1 to April 10 starting in 2011. The 2011 Jinhae Gunhangje Festival, the first held since Jinhae, Masan, and Changwon were launched as the integrated Changwon City, received an investment of 550 million KRW, and about 50 diverse events were held across the city under the theme of "Flower - Luminary - Hope." The festival grew into a nationwide-scale event, attracting a total of 2.62 million tourists, including 2.15 million Koreans and 470,000 foreigners, with its economic ripple effect reaching 60.2 billion KRW.

While the success of the Jinhae Gunhangje Festival greatly helps the local economy, residents of Jinhae-gu also complain of inconveniences. One citizen raised an issue, saying, "It is welcoming and thankful that tourists visit this place, but there are already many problems such as unauthorized garbage dumping, illegal parking, and vehicle idling." In addition, complaints were raised regarding traffic congestion during commuting and school hours.

=== Cherry Blossom Attractions of the Gunhangje Festival ===
The reason Jinhae has so many cherry blossoms was traditionally believed to be that they were planted for urban beautification when Jinhae was developed as a naval port during the Japanese colonial period. Because of this, after liberation, citizens began to indiscriminately chop down the trees, believing that cherry blossoms were the national flower of Japan. However, in 1962, botanists Park Man-kyu and Bu Jong-hyu revealed that the cherry trees in Jinhae were not the King Cherry tree (Prunus × yedoensis) native to Japan, but rather the Jeju King Cherry tree (Prunus × nudiflora), which helped the trees survive to this day through a cherry tree saving movement. Every spring, a total of 347,000 Jeju King Cherry trees, including those on street roads, parks, and mountainous areas, come into full bloom in Jinhae.

=== Republic of Korea Naval Academy and Naval Base Command ===
Korea Naval Academy and the Naval Base Command are military facilities that are normally restricted from public access, but on-site viewing is permitted during the Gunhangje Festival period. In addition, the parking lots of the Naval Education and Training Command and the Jinhae Base Command (Old Overhaul District) are opened to accommodate a total of 1,450 vehicles.

=== Korea Naval Academy ===
During the Gunhangje Festival period, the Korea Naval Academy opens its parade ground, museum, Turtle Ship, and the Naval Academy Peninsula. A sea photo exhibition is held in front of the statue of Sohn Won-yil. In front of the Turtle Ship, a photo zone is operated where visitors can take photos wearing Joseon Dynasty military officer uniforms and naval cadet uniforms. On weekdays, it is open from 8:30 AM to 4:30 PM, and admission closes at 3:30 PM. On holidays, it is open from 8:30 AM to 5:00 PM. Admission by foot closes at 3:30 PM, and admission by vehicle closes at 4:00 PM. Entry is possible either by vehicle or on foot, but on weekdays, entry is only permitted via vehicle. A paid shuttle bus also operates from Namwon Rotary to the Naval Academy (2,000 KRW per person).

=== Commander, Jinhae Naval Base ===
During the Gunhangje Festival, military police parade units perform at scheduled times each day, and naval promotional events such as warship open houses and military uniform experience programs are held. Visitors may enter the Commander, Jinhae Naval Base by vehicle or on foot, although parking, stopping, and passenger drop-off are prohibited. The base opens at 8:30 a.m. and remains open until 4:30 p.m. on weekdays and 5:00 p.m. on weekends. Admission closes 30 minutes before closing time. For walking tours (3.5 km, approximately 30–40 minutes), the route runs from Gate 1 to the statue of the late Admiral Sohn Won-yil, the statue of the late Chief Petty Officer Ji Deok-chil, and the entrance to Haeansa Temple, which serves as the turnaround point. Shuttle buses operate within the base. A driving tour (3.8 km, approximately 20 minutes) follows a route from Gate 1 to the statue of Admiral Son Won-yil, the combat swimming pool, Fleet Command, the logistics supply depot, Officers' Pier, the Logistics Command Main Gate, the naval hospital, and back to Gate 1.

=== Jangboksan Park ===
Jangboksan Park is located in Taebaek-dong, Jinhae District. One of Jinhae's best-known mountains, it is famous for a 1.5-kilometre stretch of road lined with cherry blossom trees extending from Majin Tunnel to the military checkpoint, forming a cherry blossom tunnel. In spring and autumn, hiking trails are closed to prevent forest fires, limiting access to cherry blossoms to the park area. More than 10,000 cherry trees, as well as pine and cypress trees, grow throughout the park. Attractions include the Mermaid Statue, lion statues on Jangbok Bridge, flood memorial monuments, recreational facilities, exercise equipment, and rest areas. Nearby are the Civic Hall, the Gyeongnam Literary Museum, and the Parkland amusement park, which host various cultural and artistic events.

=== Anmin Road ===
Anmin Road is a mountain pass road approximately 9 km long that connects Taebaek-dong in Jinhae District, Changwon, South Gyeongsang Province, with Anmin-dong in Seongsan District. Along the Jinhae side, cherry trees line both sides of a 5.6-kilometre two-lane road, accompanied by a wooden deck walkway. Following the opening of Jangbok Tunnel and Anmin Tunnel, traffic has become minimal, and the road is now mainly used as a scenic driving route and hiking trail. During the Gunhangje Festival, decorative lighting illuminates major locations such as the Ecological Bridge, the observatory, and Deokju Tunnel.

=== Yeojwacheon Stream ===
A cherry blossom tunnel approximately 1.5 km long extends along Yeojwacheon Stream from Parkland at the entrance to Jinhae to Jinhae Girls' High School. Visitors can enjoy walking along the boardwalk, while landscape lighting attracts large numbers of tourists even at night.The stream is also known as a filming location for the television drama Romance. The "Romance Bridge", where the drama's two main characters, Gwan-woo and Chae-won, first met during the Gunhangje Festival, remains a popular photography location.

=== Jehwangsan Park ===
Jehwangsan Park is a public park located in Jehwangsan-dong, Jinhae District. The 365-step staircase leading from Jungwon Square to the park is commonly known as the "365 Stairs", and a two-car monorail with a capacity of 20 passengers is also available. At the summit stands the nine-story Jinhae Tower, a 28-metre structure symbolizing a naval warship. The first and second floors house the Jinhae Municipal Museum, which displays archaeological artifacts and folk exhibits discovered in Jinhae. An elevator provides access to the observation area, offering panoramic views of Jinhae District and the surrounding sea. A zoo located on the eastern side of the park serves as an educational nature-learning facility for children.

=== Jinhae Inland Water Ecological Park ===
Jinhae Inland Water Ecological Park is a wetland ecological park located in Yeojwa-dong, Jinhae District. Established in 2009 around the reservoir and surrounding grounds of the former Jinhae Inland Water Fisheries Research Institute, the park features observation trails, benches, wooden bridges, and boardwalks. Observation wetlands and experiential wetlands are popular attractions. Facilities are available for observing birds such as herons that visit the wetlands, while educational displays and learning decks support environmental education programs for students and youth groups. Forest interpreters also provide ecological education and guided learning experiences.

=== Gyeonghwa Station ===
Gyeonghwa Station is known for its approximately 800-metre cherry blossom tunnel running alongside the railway tracks. Although the station building was demolished in 2000 due to declining passenger demand and maintenance issues, special cherry blossom trains operated during the Gunhangje Festival from 2009 to 2015, bringing visitors from across South Korea.

== Events ==
The Gunhangje Festival consists of an opening ceremony, memorial services, and more than sixty themed and cultural events. During the ten-day festival period, various competitions such as literary contests and bowling tournaments are held, alongside performances and cultural events including Belly dance, traditional dance, and Korean traditional music festivals.

=== Opening ceremony ===
The opening ceremony is held on a special stage erected at Jungwon Rotary. Following a pre-ceremony program beginning with a military band performance, the official ceremony takes place, followed by fireworks and celebrity performances.

=== Pre-ceremony Events ===
- Military band performance (Commander, Jinhae Naval Base)
- Angelus Choir performance (Angelus Children's Choir)
- Naval honor guard demonstration (Commander, Jinhae Naval Base)
- Taepyeongmu dance performance (Traditional Arts Research Society)
- Traditional folk song performance (Sori Sarang Gommae)
- Pungmul percussion performance and traditional dance (Jinhae Military Music Arts Group)
- "Immortal Fashion Show" (Dain)

=== Official Ceremony ===
- Introduction of guests (Master of Ceremonies)
- Declaration of opening (Executive Director of the Association)
- Opening address (Chairman of the Association)
- Welcome address (Mayor of Changwon)
- Congratulatory remarks (Governor of South Gyeongsang Province)
- Congratulatory speeches (Local National Assembly members and the Speaker of the Changwon City Council)

=== Post-ceremony Events ===
- Illumination ceremony (Guests of honor)
- Fireworks display (Namyang Chemical Co., Ltd. and Pigeon Co., Ltd.)
- Celebrity congratulatory performances (CJ Gyeongnam Broadcasting)

== Memorial Events ==
- Admiral Yi Sun-sin Victory Parade

The Admiral Yi Sun-sin Victory Parade consists of a street procession and an incense-offering ceremony at Jungwon Rotary. The parade begins at the Public Stadium and proceeds through Bukwon Rotary, Jinhae Station, the National Federation of Fisheries Cooperatives intersection, and Jungwon Rotary before returning to the stadium. The main photography section extends from the stadium to Bukwon Rotary.

The incense-offering ceremony includes a ceremonial dance, percussion performances, honor guard demonstrations, incense offerings, and a ceremonial departure drum performance.

- Memorial Rite for Admiral Yi Sun-sin

The memorial rite is held at a special altar at Bukwon Rotary and is organized by the Association for Promoting the Patriotic Spirit of Admiral Yi Chungmugong. The event consists of official ceremonies and post-ceremony performances.

=== Official Events ===
- Military band performance (Commander, Jinhae Naval Base)
- National ceremony (Association)
- Memorial rites
  - First officiant: Mayor of Changwon
  - Second officiant: Commander, Jinhae Naval Base
  - Third officiant: Chairman of the Association
  - Offering officiant: Speaker of the Changwon City Council
  - Ritual music performance (Department of Korean Traditional Music, Pusan National University College of Arts)
  - Musket salute (Commander, Jinhae Naval Base)
  - Song of Admiral Yi Sun-sin (Republic of Korea Navy Band and Jinhae Women's Choir)

=== Post-ceremony Events ===
  - Salpuri dance performance (Jinhae Traditional Music Arts Group)
  - Choral performance by the Jinhae Women's Choir
  - Samulnori performance (Jinhae Traditional Music Arts Group)
  - Naval honor guard demonstration (Commander, Jinhae Naval Base)

=== Flower and Tea Offering Ceremony at the Admiral Yi Sun-sin Statue ===
Organized by the Jinhae Branch of the Korea Tea Ceremony Association, this event is held daily at Bukwon Rotary from 10:00 a.m. to 5:00 p.m. during the festival period.

== Theme Events ==
Various hands-on cultural programs, including traditional crafts, are held along the Street of Culture. Exhibitions include a poetry and painting exhibition by Jinhae writers, an exhibition by members of the Jinhae Fine Arts Association, a joint viewing-stone exhibition, and a Vietnam War memorabilia exhibition.

Depending on the date, performances such as the Small Petals Concert, theatrical productions, Cheonjabong Pungmul performances, and magic shows are held. During the latter half of the festival, military bands participating in the Jinhae Military Band & Honor Guard Festival occasionally hold guerrilla concerts in the Street of Culture.

=== Jinhae Military Band & Honor Guard Festival ===
The festival was established in April 2007. It is organized by Changwon City and the Jinhae Military Band & Honor Guard Festival Organizing Committee, with support from the Ministry of National Defense, the Ministry of Culture, Sports and Tourism, South Gyeongsang Province, and the Korean Band Association.

Held over three days during the Gunhangje Festival, the event takes place at the Jinhae Public Stadium and other locations throughout Jinhae District. Programs include military honor guard demonstrations, street parades, military band performances, and fringe performances. Exhibition and promotional events introducing participating countries and military branches are also held.

In 2011, the festival was held from 8 to 10 April under the theme "Echoes of the Naval Port, Melodies of the Future", with eighteen teams from five countries participating.

== Transportation ==
Transportation information for the Gunhangje Festival is available through the transportation section of the festival's official website.

=== By car ===
Visitors traveling by car may reach Jinhae District via Hyeondong Interchange, Machang Bridge, Yanggok Interchange, and Jangbok Tunnel. To ensure a comfortable viewing environment, traffic restrictions are imposed at major tourist attractions expected to attract large crowds. Anmin Pass operates as a one-way route from Jinhae toward Changwon, while vehicle traffic is completely prohibited on certain sections of Yeojwacheon Stream during the festival period.

=== By rail ===
Visitors may travel by train to nearby Masan station, Changwon station, or Changwonjungang station, and continue to the festival area by bus or taxi.

Until 2015, Korail operated special tourist trains during the cherry blossom season. These trains departed from major railway stations throughout South Korea and stopped at Tonghae station, Jinhae station, and Gyeonghwa Station. The service was discontinued after 2015.

=== By bus ===
Shuttle buses operate during the festival period. Several city bus routes passing through Jungwon Rotary are temporarily adjusted, and temporary bus stops are established along detour routes.

==== Changwon Station Plaza ====
- Trunk routes: 100, 102, 108, 109, 111, 113, 115, 122, 162
- Branch routes: 20, 21, 23, 24, 27, 40, 41, 42, 44, 45, 46, 63, 65, 70
- Express-seat routes: 703, 751, 760, 762

A taxi ride from Changwon Station to the festival area costs approximately 17,000 won.

==== Masan Station Plaza ====
- Trunk routes: 100, 101, 102, 108, 109, 122, 160, 162
- Branch routes: 27, 46, 60, 61, 62, 64, 72, 74, 75, 76, 77, 78, 1000
- Express-seat routes: 760

A taxi ride from Masan Station to the festival area costs approximately 15,000 won.
