= Yonggang station =

Railway station in South Korea

Yonggang station is a railway station on the Gyeongjeon Line and Deoksan Line in South Korea. The Deoksan Line connects to Deoksan station.
