= Jillye station =

Railway station in Gimhae, South Korea

진례
Jillye
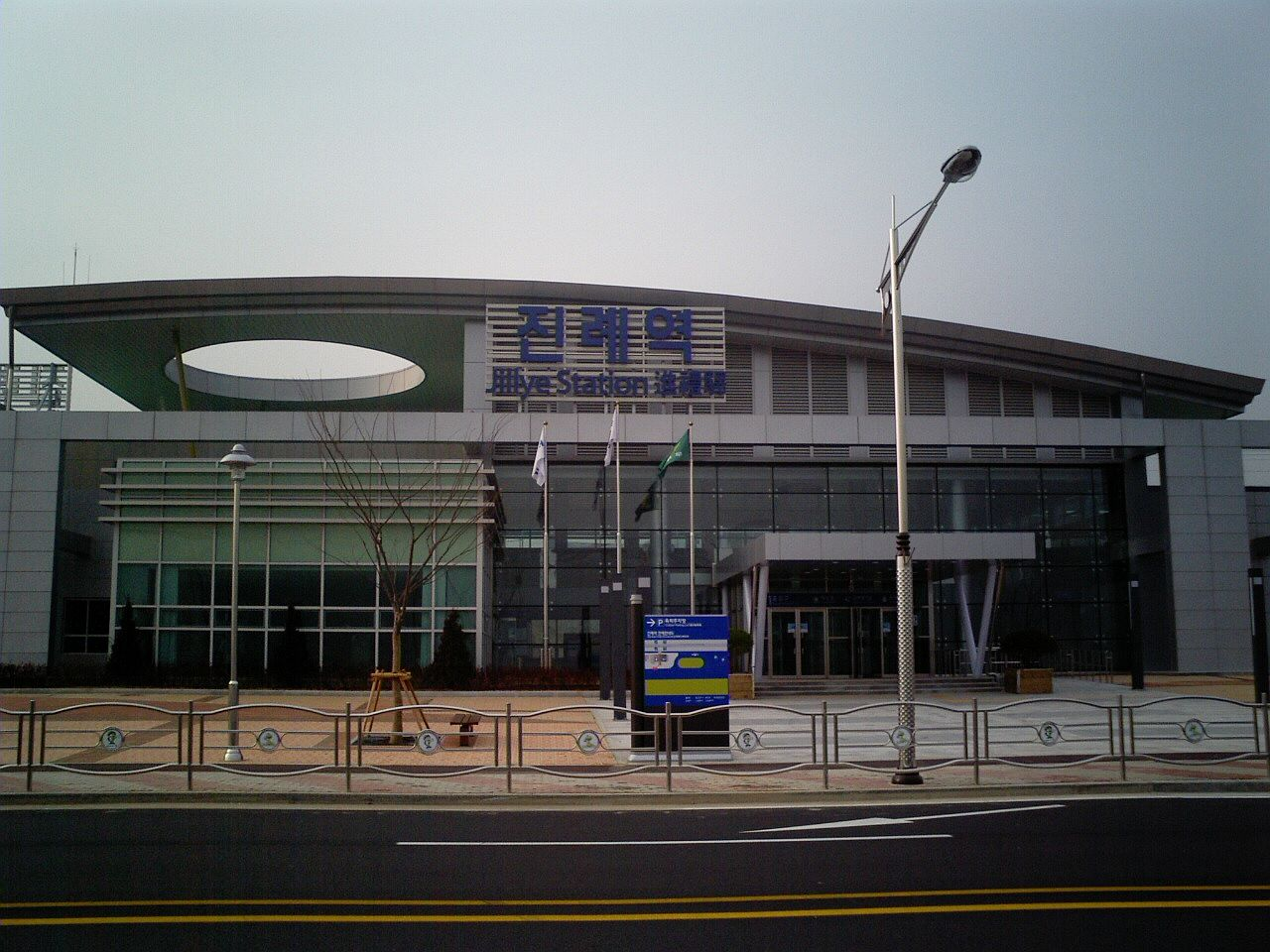

General information
- Location: South Korea
- Coordinates: 35.2665°N 128.7630°E
- Operator: Korail
- Lines: Gyeongjeon Line; Busansinhang Line

Construction
- Structure type: Aboveground

Services
Preceding station	Korail	Following station
Jinyeong towards Dongdaegu	ITX-Maum Gyeongjeon Line	Changwonjungang towards Jinju
Jinyeong towards Bujeon or Dongdaegu	Mugunghwa-ho Gyeongjeon Line	Changwonjungang towards Jinju or Suncheon
Location
Location within South Korea

Jillye Station is a railway station in South Korea. It is on the Gyeongjeon Line and the Busansinhang Line. The Busansinhang Line connects to Busansinhang (New Busan Port).
