= Gunbuk station =

Railway station in South Korea

군북
Gunbuk
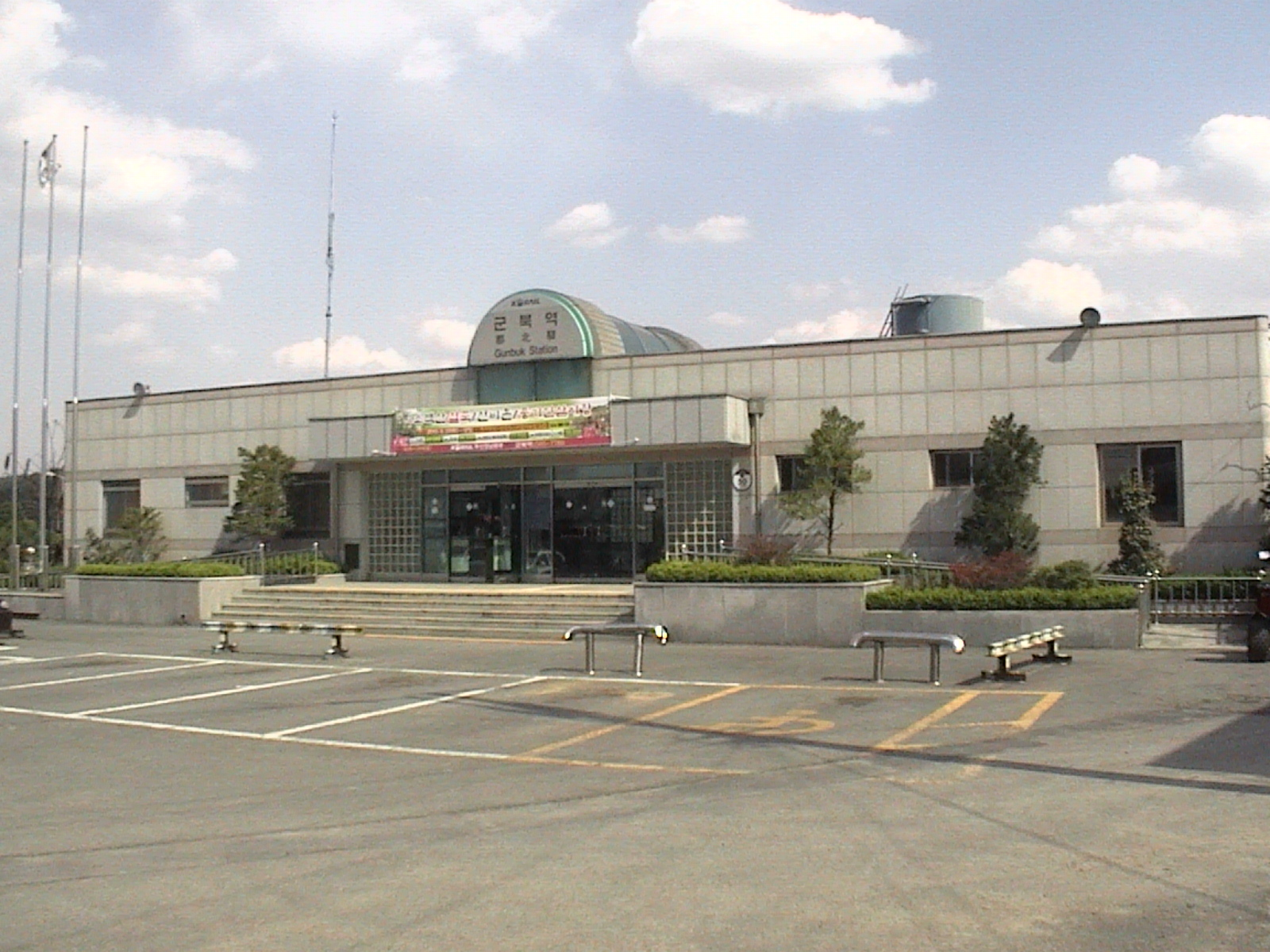

General information
- Location: South Korea
- Coordinates: 35°15′5.5″N 128°21′1.7″E
- Operator: Korail
- Line: Gyeongjeon Line

Construction
- Structure type: Aboveground

Services
| Preceding station | Korail | Following station |
|---|---|---|
| Haman towards Dongdaegu | ITX-Maum Gyeongjeon Line | Banseong towards Jinju |
| Haman towards Bujeon or Dongdaegu | Mugunghwa-ho Gyeongjeon Line | Banseong towards Jinju or Suncheon |
| Haman towards Bujeon | Mugunghwa-ho Mokpo–Boseong Line | Banseong towards Mokpo |
Location
Location within South Korea

Gunbuk Station is a railway station in Gunbuk-myeon, Haman County, South Gyeongsang Province, South Korea. It is on the Gyeongjeon Line.
