= Jung-ri station =

Railway station in Changwon, South Korea

Coordinates: 35°14′59″N 128°31′9″E

중리
Jung-ri
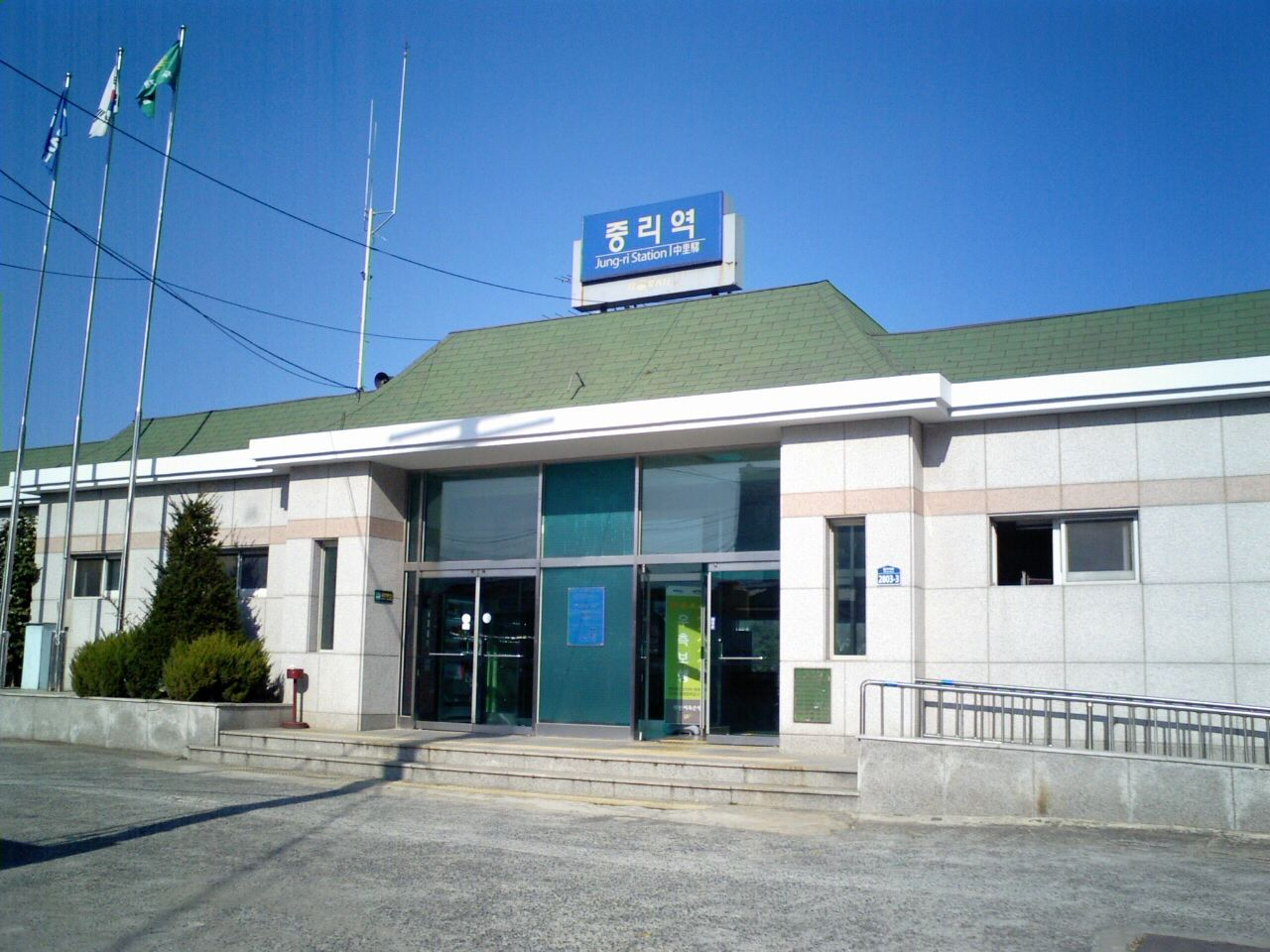

General information
- Location: South Korea
- Operator: Korail
- Line: Gyeongjeon Line

Construction
- Structure type: Aboveground

Services
| Preceding station | Korail | Following station |
|---|---|---|
| Masan towards Dongdaegu | ITX-Maum Gyeongjeon Line | Haman towards Jinju |
| Masan towards Bujeon or Dongdaegu | Mugunghwa-ho Gyeongjeon Line | Haman towards Jinju or Suncheon |
| Masan towards Bujeon | Mugunghwa-ho Mokpo–Boseong Line | Haman towards Mokpo |
Location
Location within South Korea

Jung-ri Station is a railway station in South Korea. It is on the Gyeongjeon Line.
