= Seogwangju station =

Railway station in South Korea

서광주
Seogwangju

General information
- Location: South Korea
- Coordinates: 35°7′30.00″N 126°50′47.63″E
- Operator: Korail
- Line: Gyeongjeon Line

Construction
- Structure type: Aboveground

Services
Preceding station	Korail	Following station
Hyocheon towards Suncheon	Mugunghwa-ho Gyeongjeon Line	GwangjuSongjeong Terminus
Location
Location within South Korea

Seogwangju Station is a railway station on the Gyeongjeon Line in South Korea.
