= Neungju station =

Railway station in South Korea

능주
Neungju

General information
- Location: South Korea
- Coordinates: 34.9866°N 126.9640°E
- Operator: Korail
- Line: Gyeongjeon Line

Construction
- Structure type: Aboveground

History
- Opened: September 27, 2013

Services
Preceding station	Korail	Following station
Iyang towards Suncheon	Mugunghwa-ho Gyeongjeon Line	Hwasun towards GwangjuSongjeong
Location
Location within South Korea

Neungju Station is a railway station on the Gyeongjeon Line in South Korea.
