= Hwasun station =

Railway station in South Korea

화순
Hwasun
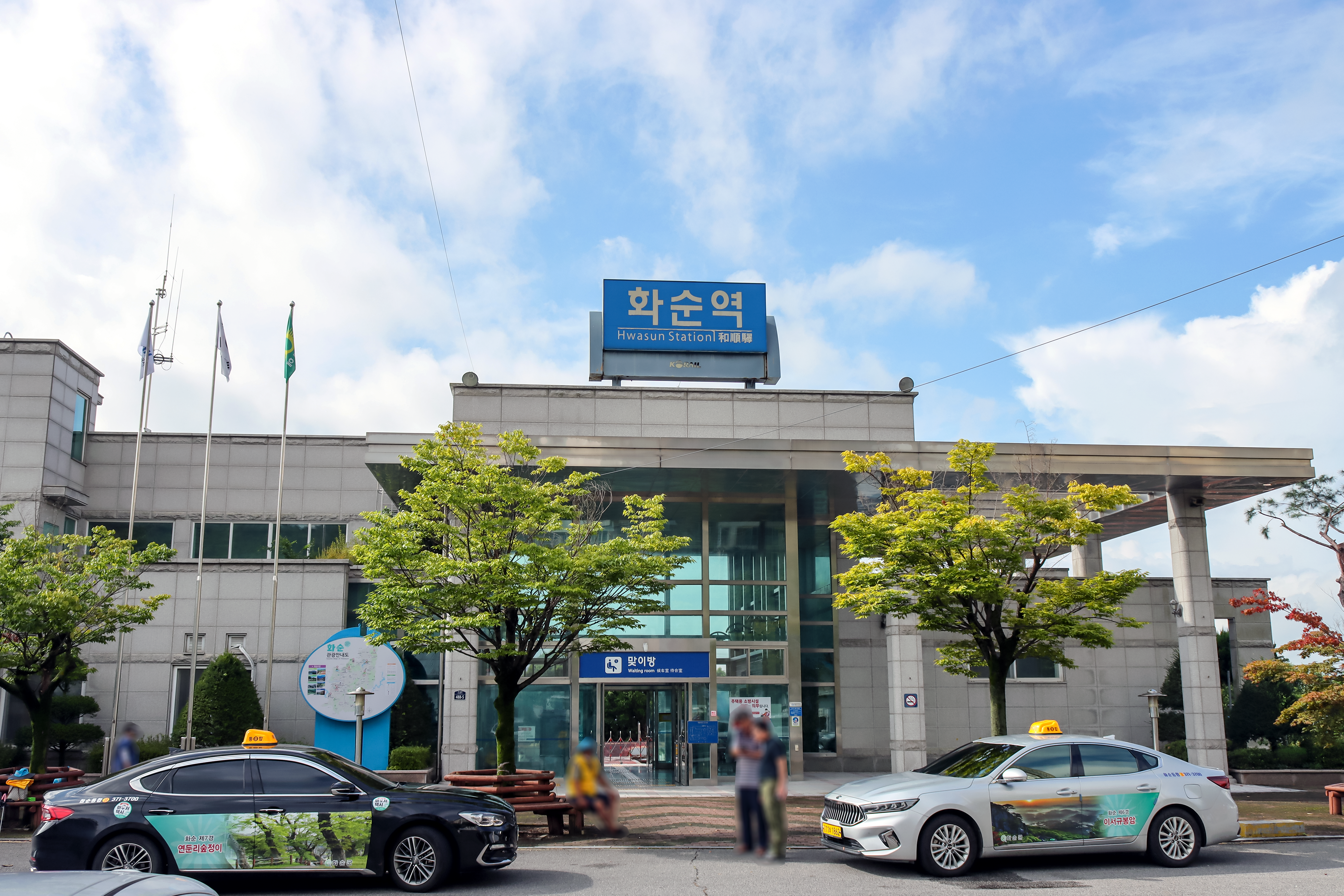

General information
- Location: South Korea
- Coordinates: 35°3′4.78″N 126°57′43.12″E
- Operator: Korail
- Line: Gyeongjeon Line

Construction
- Structure type: Aboveground

Services
| Preceding station | Korail | Following station |
|---|---|---|
| Neungju towards Suncheon | Mugunghwa-ho Gyeongjeon Line | Hyocheon towards GwangjuSongjeong |
Location
Location within South Korea

Hwasun Station is a railway station in South Korea. It is on the Gyeongjeon Line.
