= Yangbo station =

Railway station in South Korea

양보
Yangbo

General information
- Location: South Korea
- Coordinates: 35.0900°N 127.8438°E
- Operator: Korail
- Line: Gyeongjeon Line

Construction
- Structure type: Aboveground
Location
Location within South Korea

Yangbo Station is a closed railway station on the Gyeongjeon Line in South Korea.
