= Jinseong station =

Railway station in South Korea

Coordinates: 35°9′39.35″N 128°13′37.76″E

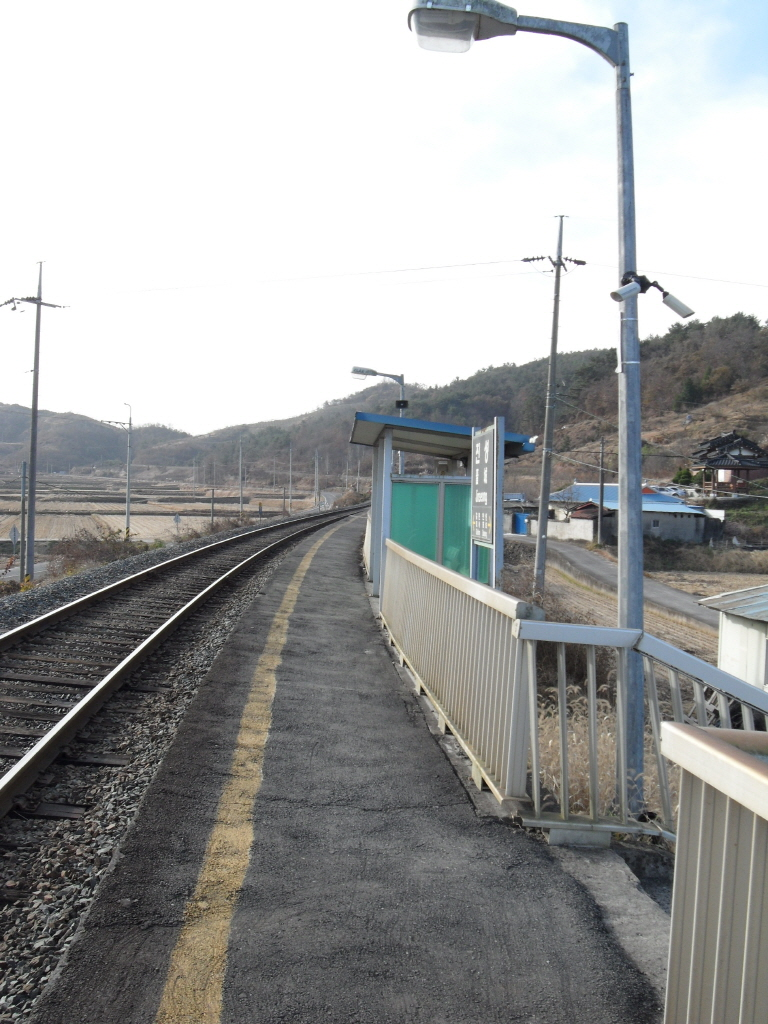
Jinseong Station

Jinseong station is a railway station in South Korea. It is on the Gyeongjeon Line.
