= Dongsongjeong station =

Railway station in South Korea

동송정
Dongsongjeong

General information
- Location: South Korea
- Coordinates: 35°8′42.87″N 126°49′0.41″E
- Operator: Korail
- Line: Gyeongjeon Line

Construction
- Structure type: Aboveground
Location
Location within South Korea

Dongsongjeong Station is a railway station in South Korea. It is on the Gyeongjeon Line.
