= Okgok station =

Railway station in South Korea

옥곡
Okgok
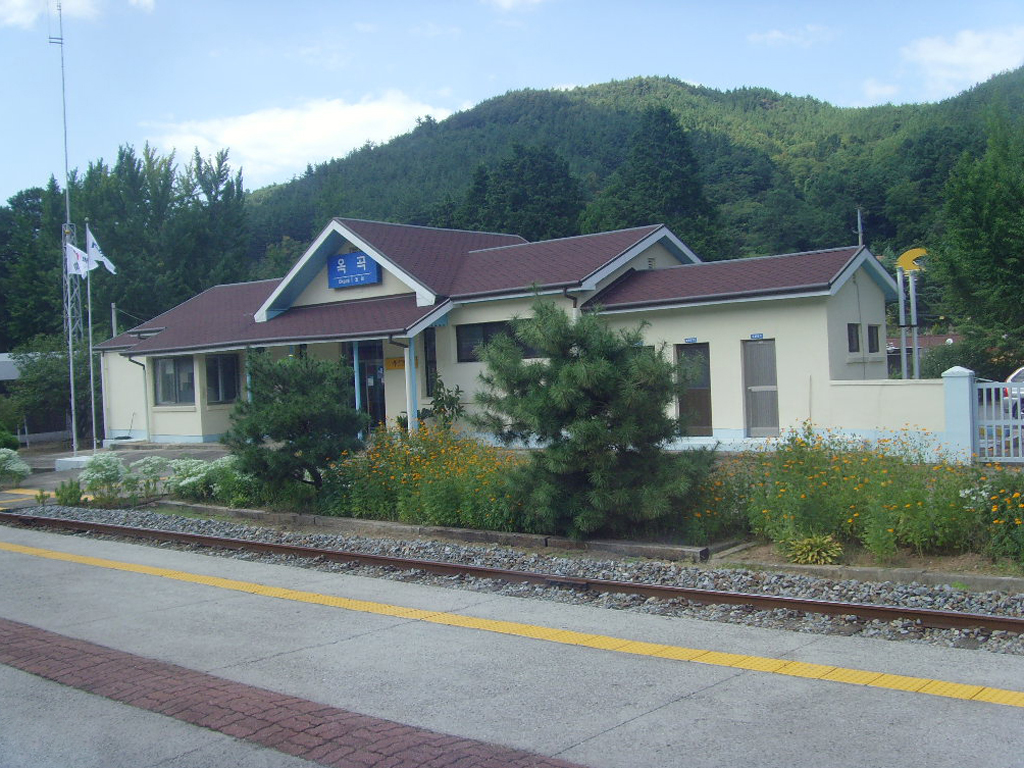

General information
- Location: South Korea
- Coordinates: 34°59′22.24″N 127°41′40.77″E
- Operator: Korail
- Line: Gyeongjeon Line

Construction
- Structure type: Aboveground
Location
Location within South Korea

Okgok Station was a railway station on the Gyeongjeon Line in South Korea. It was one of five stations closed in July 2016, when the double-tracked Jinju–Gwangyang section of the line opened.
