= Nammunsan station =

Defunct railway station in South Korea

Coordinates: 35°9′53.53″N 128°9′45.6″E

Nammunsan station 남문산역
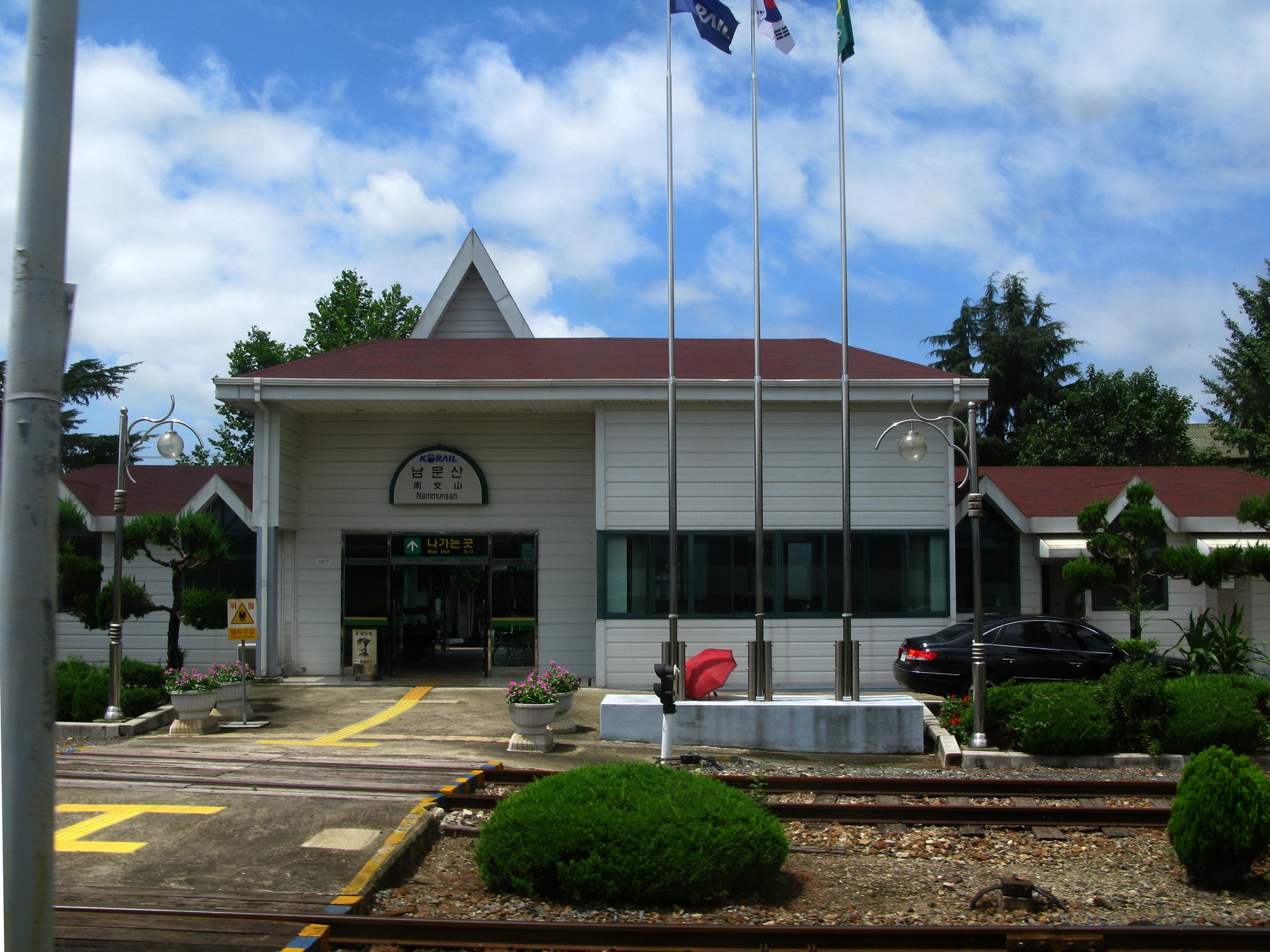

General information
- Operator: Korail
- Line: Gyeongjeon Line
Location

Nammunsan station (남문산역) is a defunct railway station on the Gyeongjeon Line in South Korea.
