= Wonchang station =

Railway station in South Korea

원창
Wonchang

General information
- Location: South Korea
- Coordinates: 34°51′57.23″N 127°26′52.63″E
- Operator: Korail
- Line: Gyeongjeon Line

Construction
- Structure type: Aboveground
Location
Location within South Korea

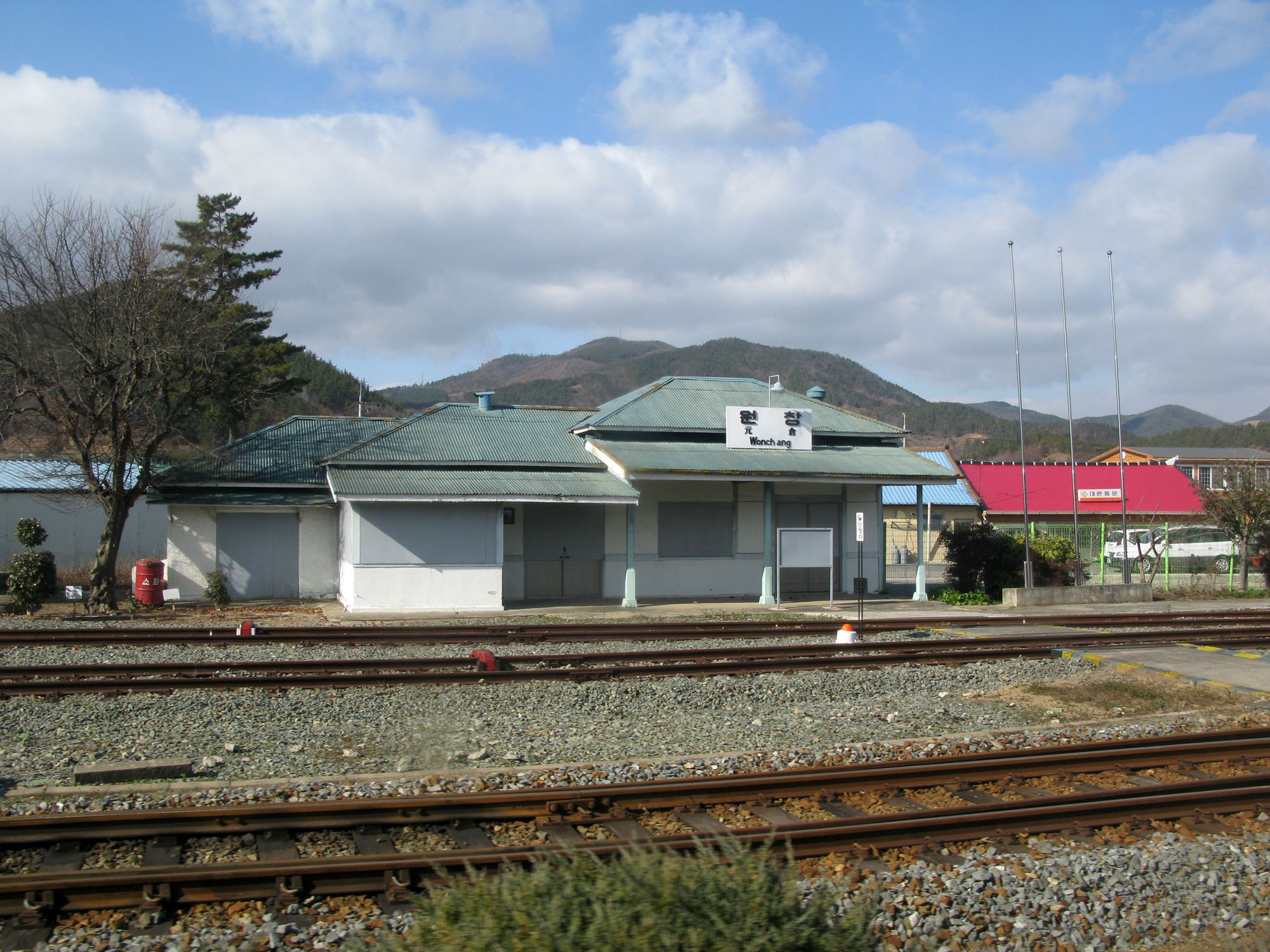
Wongchang Station in 2009

Wonchang Station is a railway station in South Korea. It is on the Gyeongjeon Line.
