= Gwanggok station =

Railway station in South Korea

광곡
Gwanggok
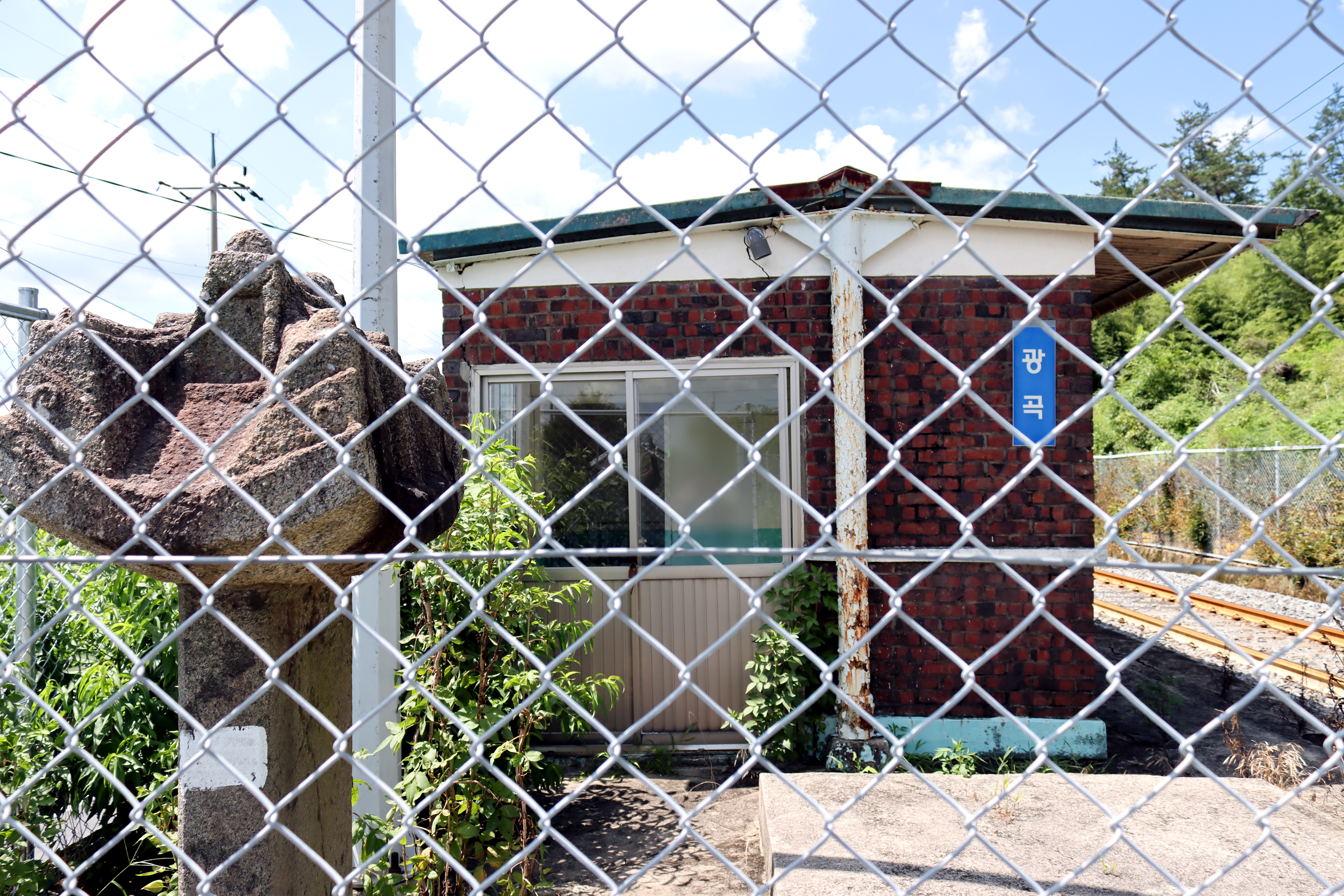

General information
- Location: South Korea
- Coordinates: 34°47′47″N 127°4′23″E
- Operator: Korail
- Line: Gyeongjeon Line

Construction
- Structure type: Aboveground
Location
Location within South Korea

Gwanggok Station is a railway station in South Korea. It is on the Gyeongjeon Line.
