= Pyeongchon station (Jinju) =

Defunct railway station in South Korea

Coordinates: 35°11′10.75″N 128°19′51.8″E

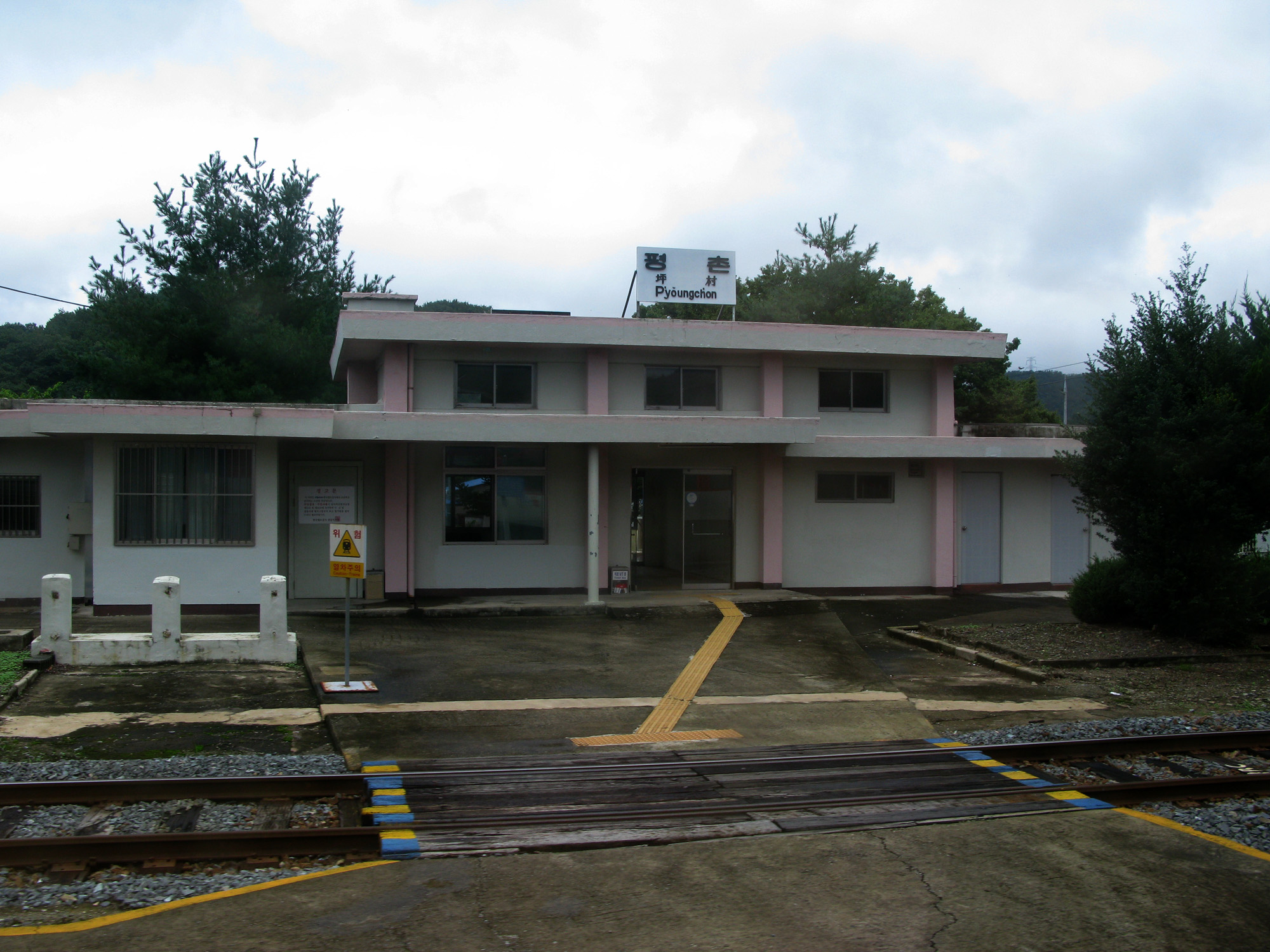
Korail Gyeongjeon Line, Pyeongchon Station Rearside

Pyeongchon station is a railway station on the Gyeongjeon Line in Jinju, South Korea.
