= Jinyeong station =

Railway station in Gimhae, South Korea

진영
Jinyeong
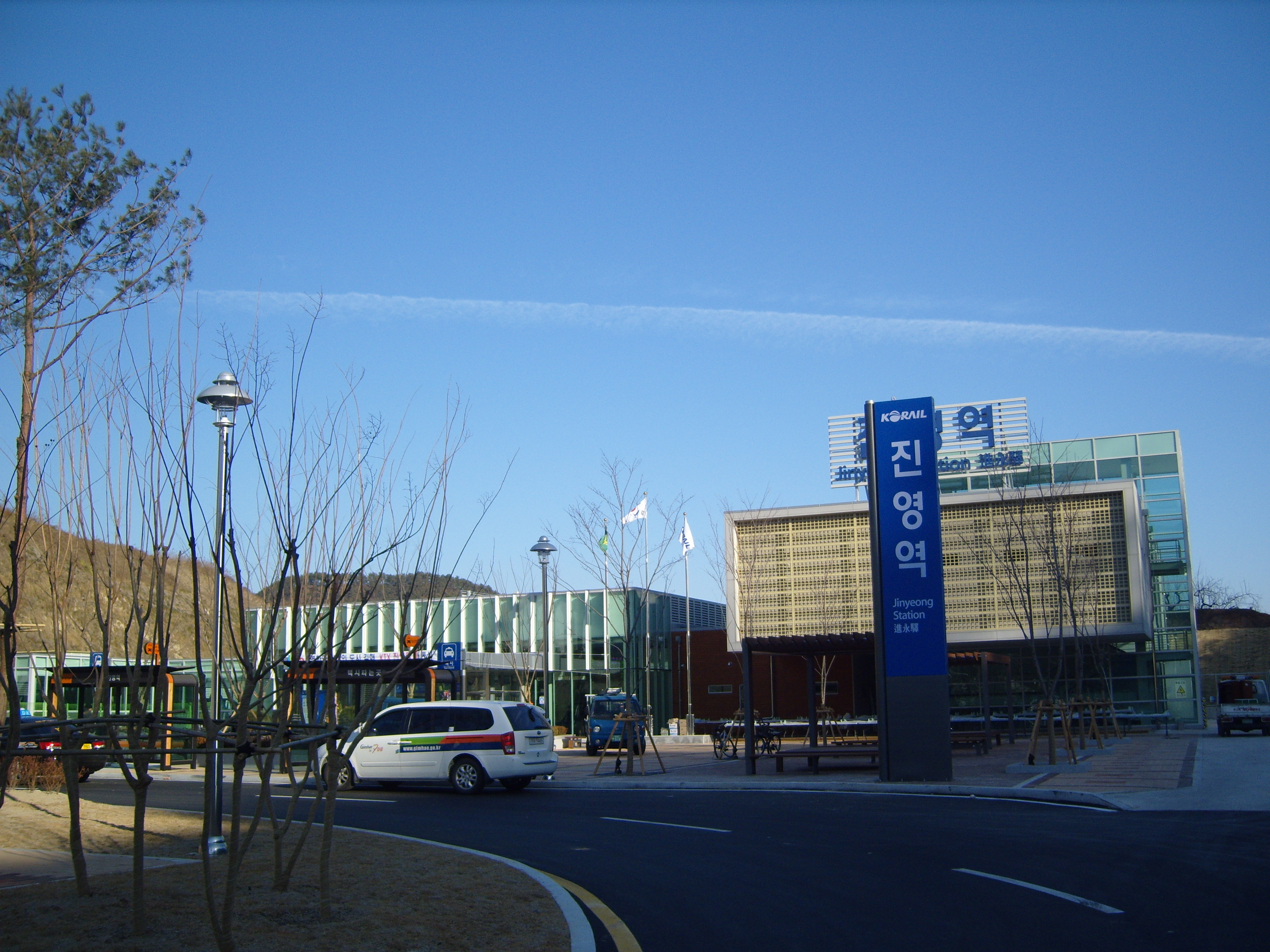

Korean name
- Hangul: 진영역
- Hanja: 進永驛
- Revised Romanization: Jinyeongnyeok
- McCune–Reischauer: Chinyŏngnyŏk

General information
- Location: Seolchang-ri, Jinyeong-eup, Gimhae, South Gyeongsang; South Korea
- Coordinates: 35°18′13.67″N 128°43′47.67″E
- Operator: Korail
- Line: Gyeongjeon Line
- Platforms: 2
- Tracks: 4

Construction
- Structure type: Aboveground

History
- Opened: October 21, 1905

Services
| Preceding station | Korea Train Express | Following station |
|---|---|---|
| Miryang towards Haengsin or Suseo | Gyeongjeon KTX | Changwonjungang towards Jinju |
| Preceding station | Korail | Following station |
| Miryang towards Seoul | ITX-Saemaeul Gyeongjeon Line | Changwonjungang towards Jinju |
| Hallimjeong towards Dongdaegu | ITX-Maum Gyeongjeon Line | Jillye towards Jinju |
| Hallimjeong towards Bujeon or Dongdaegu | Mugunghwa-ho Gyeongjeon Line | Jillye towards Jinju or Suncheon |
| Hallimjeong towards Bujeon | Mugunghwa-ho Mokpo–Boseong Line | Changwonjungang towards Mokpo |
Location
- Location within South Korea

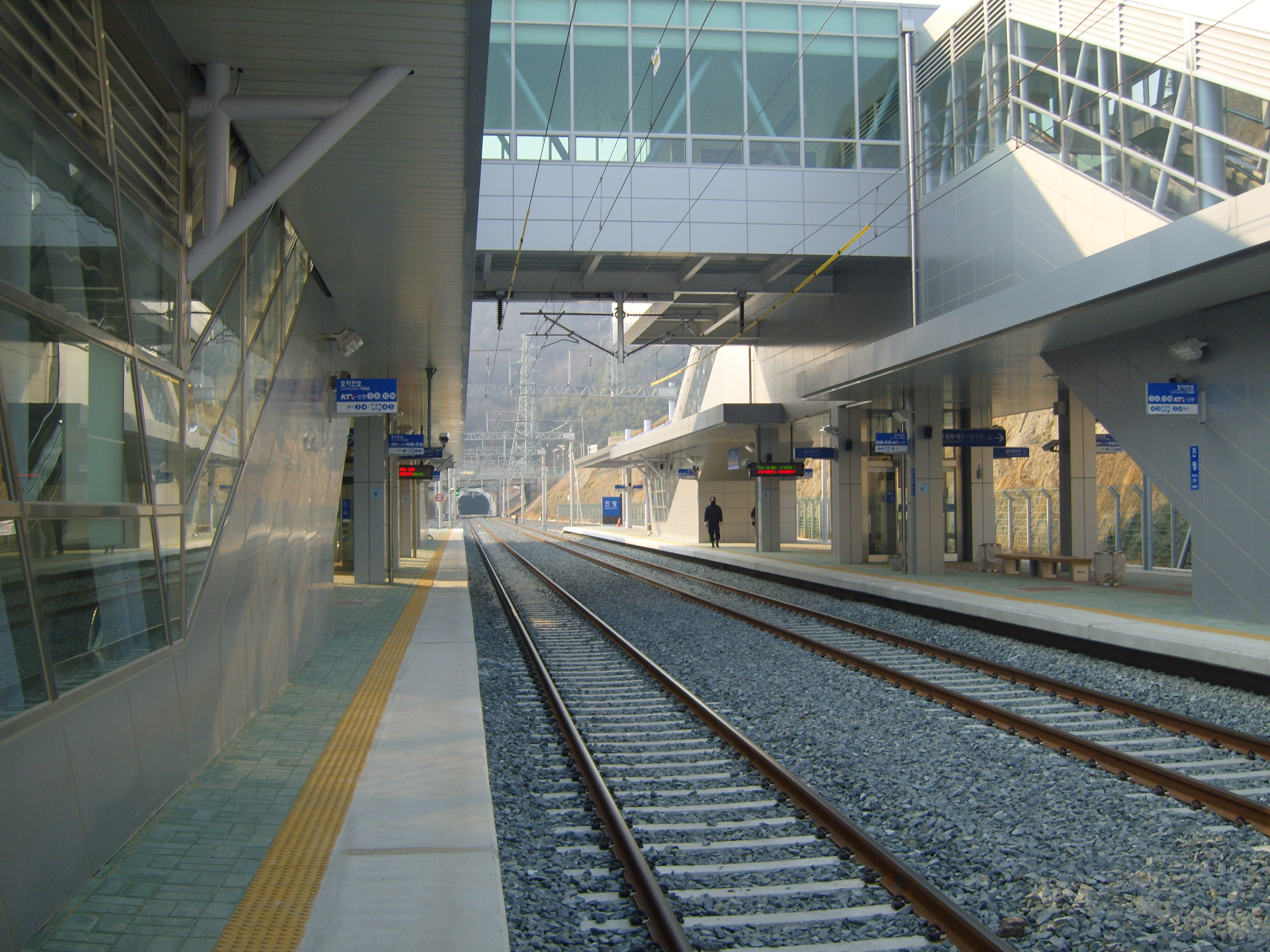
Jinyeong Station

Jinyeong Station is a railway station in South Korea. It is on the Gyeongjeon Line.
