= Hallimjeong station =

South Korea train station

한림정
Hallimjeong
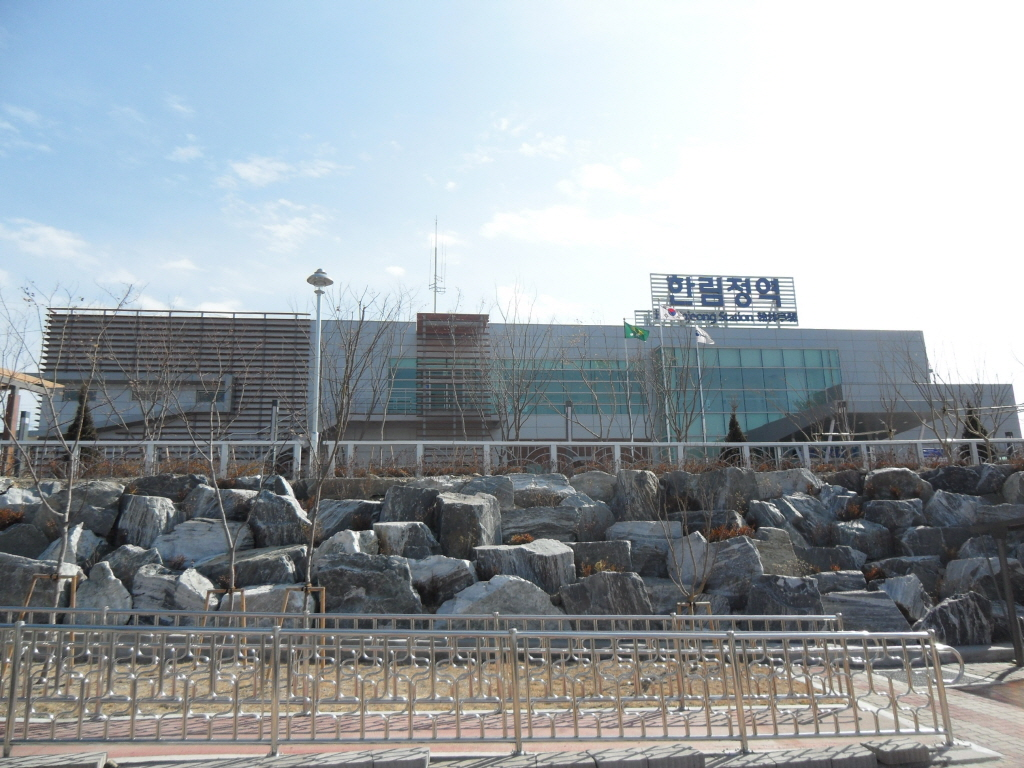

General information
- Location: South Korea
- Coordinates: 35°19′17.6″N 128°48′12.71″E
- Operator: Korail
- Line: Gyeongjeon Line

Construction
- Structure type: Aboveground

Services
| Preceding station | Korail | Following station |
|---|---|---|
| Miryang towards Dongdaegu | ITX-Maum Gyeongjeon Line | Jinyeong towards Jinju |
| Miryang towards Dongdaegu | Mugunghwa-ho Gyeongjeon Line | Jinyeong towards Jinju |
| Samnangjin towards Bujeon | Mugunghwa-ho Gyeongjeon Line | Jinyeong towards Suncheon |
| Samnangjin towards Bujeon | Mugunghwa-ho Mokpo–Boseong Line | Jinyeong towards Mokpo |
Location
Location within South Korea

Hallimjeong Station is a railway station in South Korea. It is on the Gyeongjeon Line.
