= Haman station =

Railway station in Haman, South Korea

함안
Haman
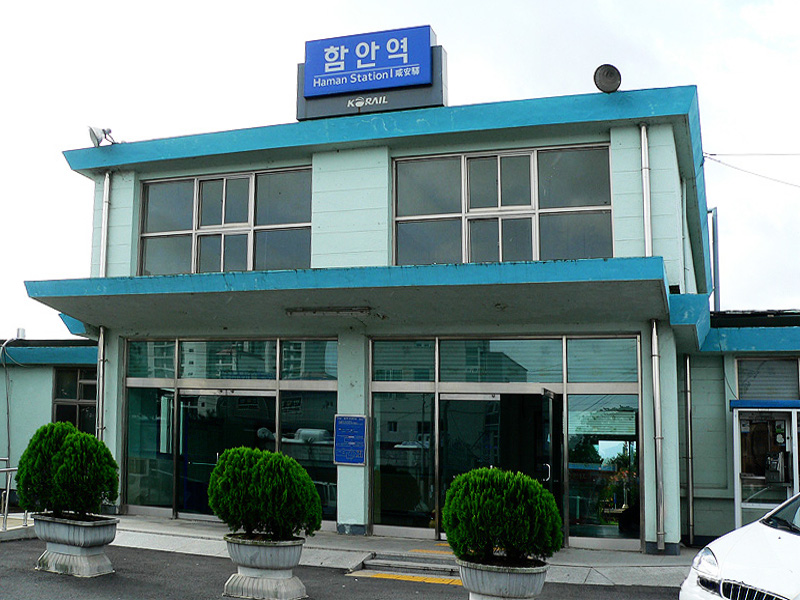

General information
- Coordinates: 35°14′57″N 128°25′29″E
- Owner: Korail
- Line: Gyeongjeon Line

Services
Preceding station	Korail	Following station
Masan towards Seoul	ITX-Saemaeul Gyeongjeon Line	Jinju Terminus
Jung-ri towards Dongdaegu	ITX-Maum Gyeongjeon Line	Gunbuk towards Jinju
Jung-ri towards Bujeon or Dongdaegu	Mugunghwa-ho Gyeongjeon Line	Gunbuk towards Jinju or Suncheon
Jung-ri towards Bujeon	Mugunghwa-ho Mokpo–Boseong Line	Gunbuk towards Mokpo
Location
Location within South Korea

Haman Station is a railway station in Haman, South Korea. It is on the Gyeongjeon Line. As of November 2026, KTX services still do not stop at this station.

Since December 2012, the KTX train operates from Jinju to Seoul. It has stopped operating KTX since April 2015.
