= Banseong station =

Railway station in Jinju, South Korea

반성
Banseong
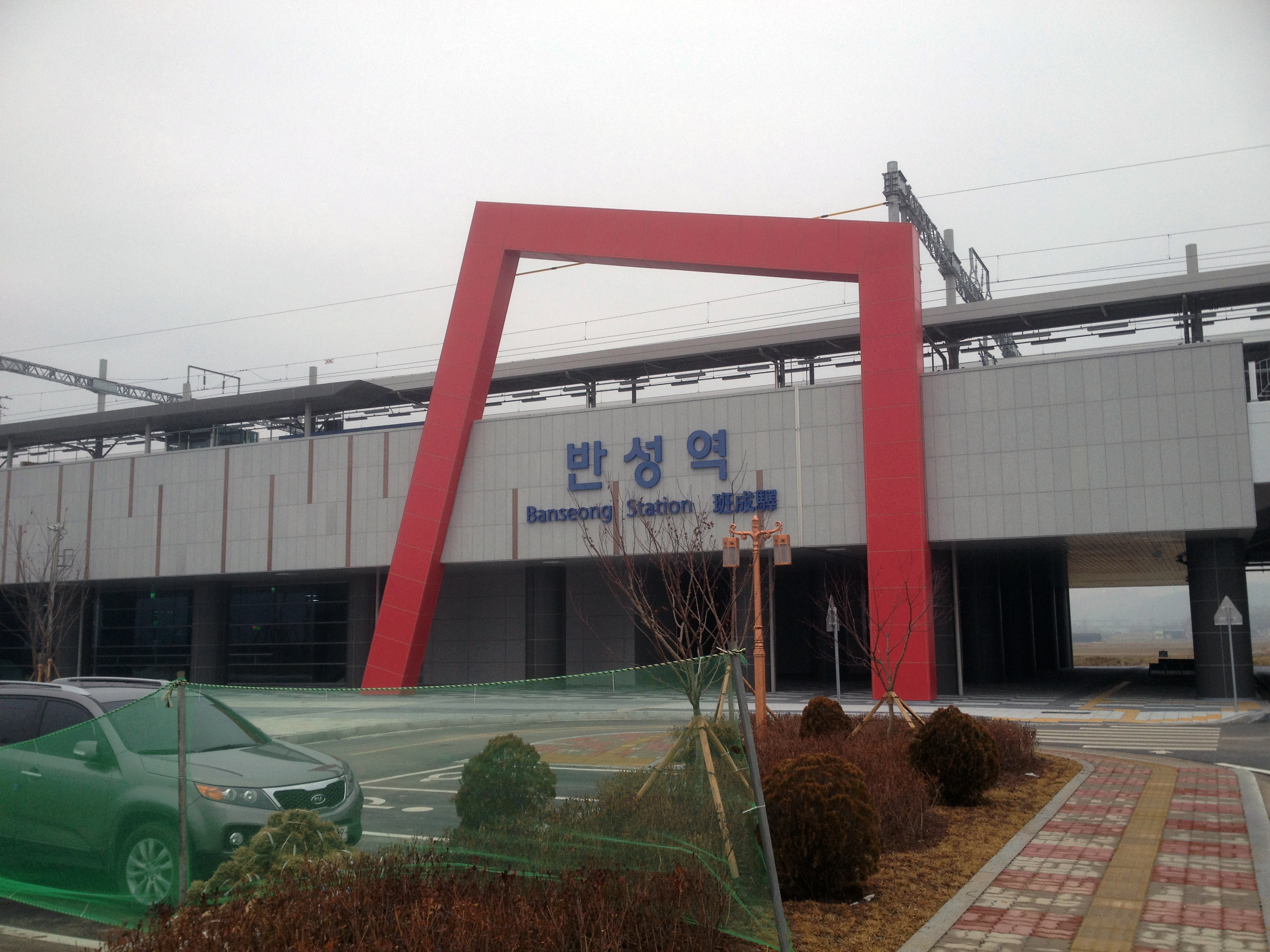

General information
- Location: South Korea
- Coordinates: 35°10′29″N 128°15′29″E
- Operator: Korail
- Line: Gyeongjeon Line

Construction
- Structure type: Aboveground

Services
Preceding station	Korail	Following station
Gunbuk towards Dongdaegu	ITX-Maum Gyeongjeon Line	Jinju Terminus
Gunbuk towards Dongdaegu	Mugunghwa-ho Gyeongjeon Line Dongdaegu–Jinju	Jinju Terminus
Gunbuk towards Bujeon	Mugunghwa-ho Gyeongjeon Line Bujeon–Suncheon	Jinju towards Suncheon
Gunbuk towards Bujeon	Mugunghwa-ho Mokpo–Boseong Line	Jinju towards Mokpo
Location
Location within South Korea

Banseong Station is a railway station in Jinju, South Korea. It is on the Gyeongjeon Line.
