= Jinhae Line =

Short branch railway inside Changwon City, South Gyeongsang Province

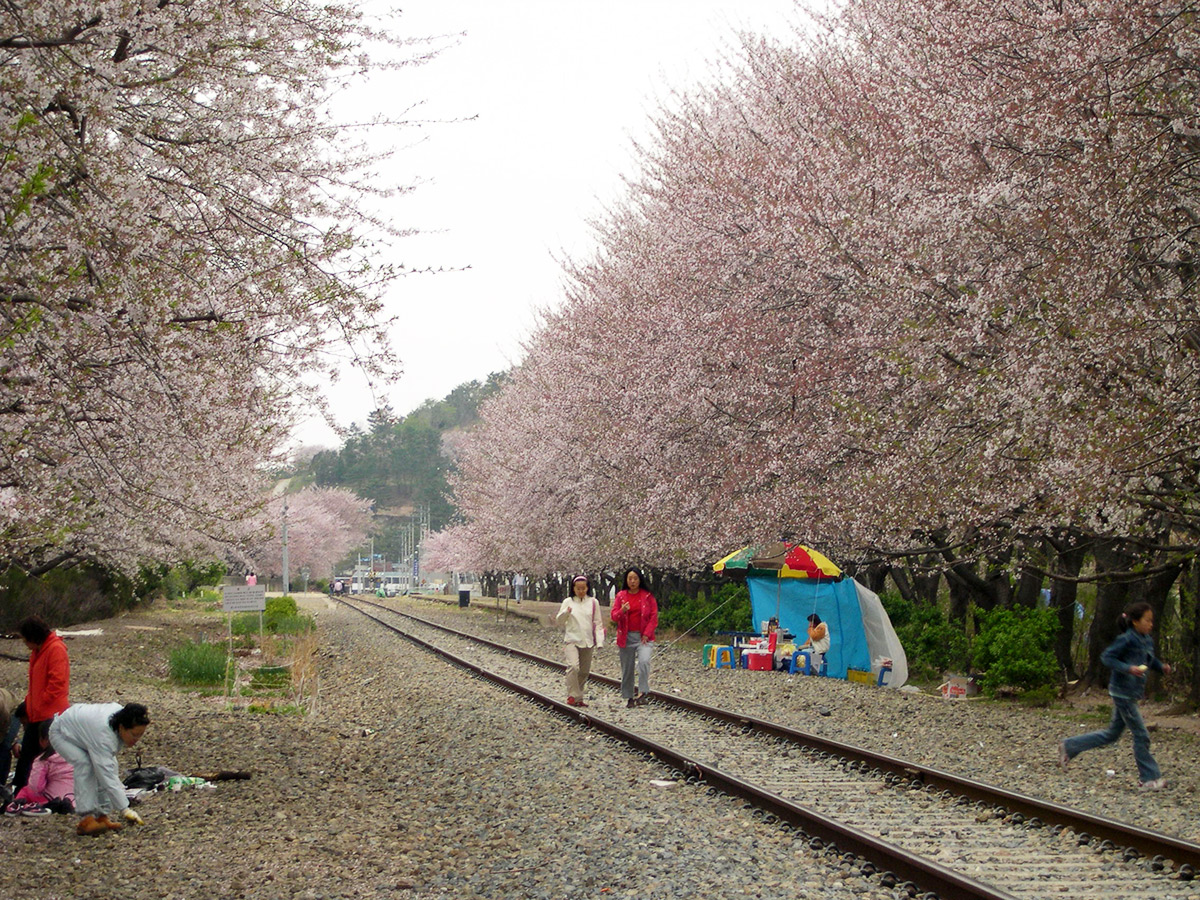
- Cherry blossoms at the Jinhae Line, 2004

Overview
- Native name: 진해선(慶全線)
- Status: Operational
- Owner: Korea Rail Network Authority
- Locale: South Gyeongsang; South Jeolla; Gwangju
- Termini: Changwon Station; Tonghae Station
- Continues from: Gyeongjeon Line
- Stations: 7

Service
- Type: Heavy rail, Passenger/Freight rail Regional rail
- Operator(s): Korail

History
- Opened: 1921
- Closed: Passenger service defunct from 2016

Technical
- Line length: 21.2 km (13.2 mi)
- Number of tracks: Single track
- Track gauge: 1,435 mm (4 ft 8 1/2 in) standard gauge
- Electrification: 25 kV/60 Hz AC catenary (Changwon-Sinchangwon)
Route map
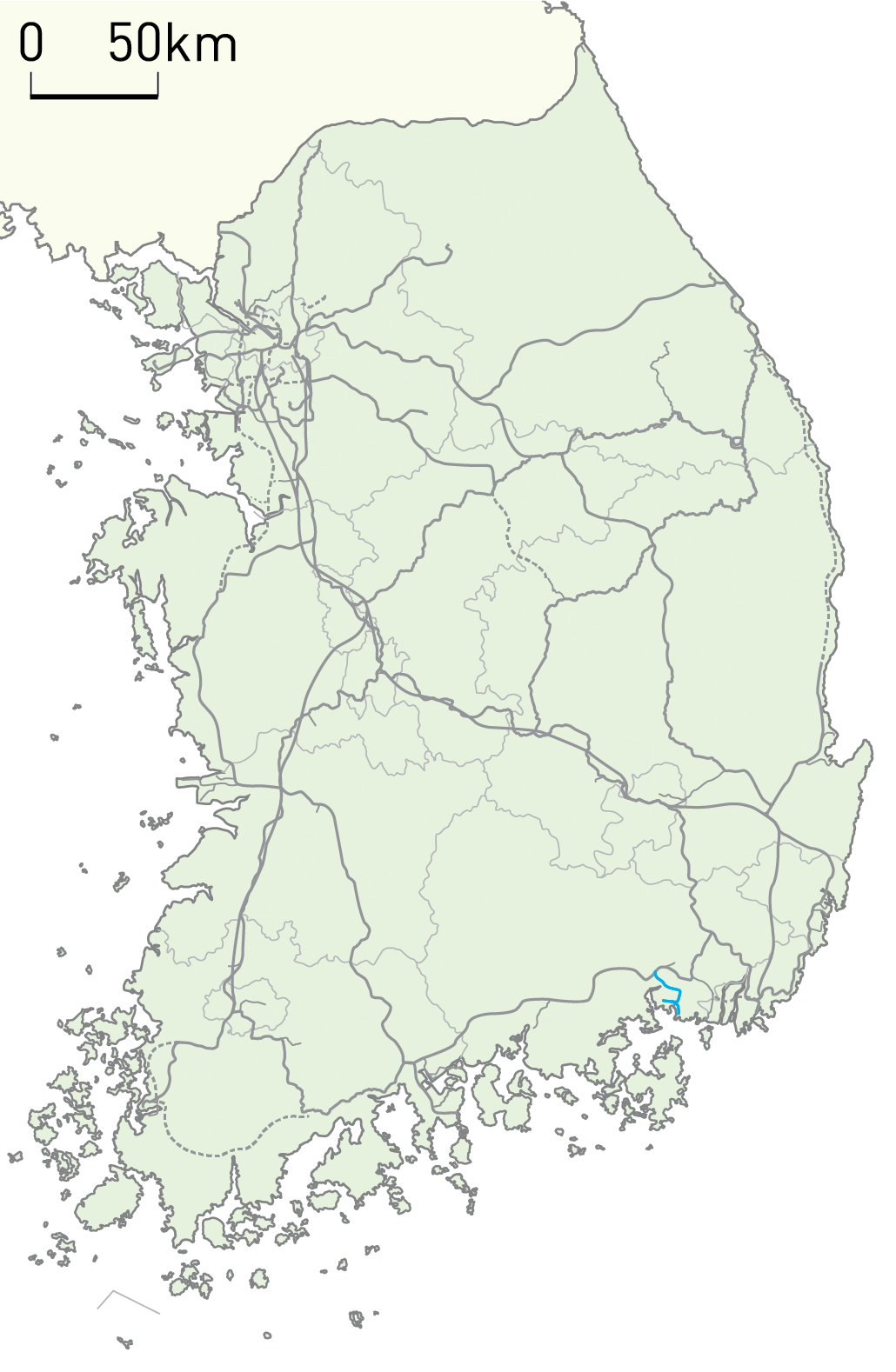

The Jinhae Line is a branch railway of the Gyeongjeon Line connecting the regions of Changwon to Jinhae inside Changwon City. It was named after the Port of Jinhae, as it was constructed to link the Gyeongbu Line and the Gyeongjeon Line with its emerging port facilities. The route is approximately 21.2 km long, and the track gauge is 1,435 mm (standard gauge). There are 7 stations, with the electrified section from Changwon Station to Sinchangwon Station spanning 4.8 km, managed by the Korea Railroad Corporation. There are no double-track sections, and the line is equipped with an Automatic Train Stop (ATS) system for safety.

== History ==
=== Construction and opening ===
Construction of the line began on October 10, 1921, and was completed on November 11, 1926, opening the Gyeonghwa, Jinhae, and Tongjebuyeok stations. The line was constructed during the Japanese colonial period, and was initially managed by the South Manchuria Railway company until it became directly managed in 1926. It is believed that the Jinhae Line was built to maintain a Japanese naval base in Jinhae, considering the geographical conditions, and to serve as a civilian access railway to the Port of Jinhae.

On April 1, 1961, Yongwon Station was opened, followed by the opening of the Jinhae Station to No. 4 Fertilizer Plant branch on September 16, 1966. Seongjusa Station opened on November 11, 1967.

=== Relocation of track ===
The route was relocated in 1978 to accommodate the construction of the Changwon Industrial Complex, which involved the relocation of stations along the Changwon section. The 9.8 km Yongwon to Gyeonghwa section relocation project began on May 19, 1978, and Yongwon Station was renamed Sinchangwon Station on January 15, 1981. On May 25 of the same year, the relocated 11.0 km section between Yongwon and Gyeonghwa was completed, and Namchangwon Station opened on October 10, 1981.

=== Decline and end of passenger service ===
On April 21, 1986, Tongjebu Station was renamed to Tonghae Station. On June 1, 2006, the Saemaeul train service between Dongdaegu and Jinhae began, and on November 1, 2006, the Jinhae Line commuter train service was discontinued. During the time when commuter trains were in operation, Tonghae Station was listed on the railway distance chart as a passenger-handling station, but it was not actually in use. Additionally, while a commuter train did operate, passengers were unable to board or disembark there.

The Jinhae Line mainly operated commuter and temporary tourist trains, but after the commuter service was discontinued on November 1, 2006, there were no regular trains except for the Daegu-departing Saemaeul trains connected with the KTX. By 2007, none of the stations on the Jinhae Line, except for Jinhae Station and Sinchangwon Station, handled passenger services.

In 2012, the Daegu-to-Jinhae trains were discontinued, mainly due to the extension of KTX high-speed rail service to Masan Station which mostly killed off demand. After that, diesel commuter trains ran from one end of the line to the other end designated as Mugunghwa-ho trains. The service, going from Jinhae to Masan Station, cost more than forty times than the railway earned from ticket sales, with only two people per day using the trains by 2015. Finally being designated as a line to be closed in 2014, on February 2, 2015, the last regular serviced train arrived at Jinhae Station. Following the arrival of chartered trains for the Cherry Blosson festival that April, no passenger trains arrived in the Jinhae Line since then as of 2024.

Planning is underway since 2024 to reuse the track as a metro railway to be serviced by hydrogen-powered trams.

== Characteristics ==
The stations within Changwon City on the Jinhae Line include Seongjusa Station, Changwon Station, Namchangwon Station, and Sinchangwon Station. The line still plays an important role in freight transport to various industrial and special facilities along its route, including the railway vehicle manufacturing plant of Hyundai Rotem. While overhead wires are installed between Changwon and Sinchangwon for testing and transfer of electric trains produced by Rotem, these facilities are not used by the mainline trains operated by the Korea Railroad Corporation. A large industrial complex is located to the north of the Jinhae Line, housing companies such as Samsung Heavy Industries, Doosan Heavy Industries, Daehan Chemicals, and Sammi Special Steel, along with metal factories like Gyeongnam Metal, Mijin Metal, and Beomhan Metal.
