= Changwon station =

Train stop in South Korea

창원
Changwon
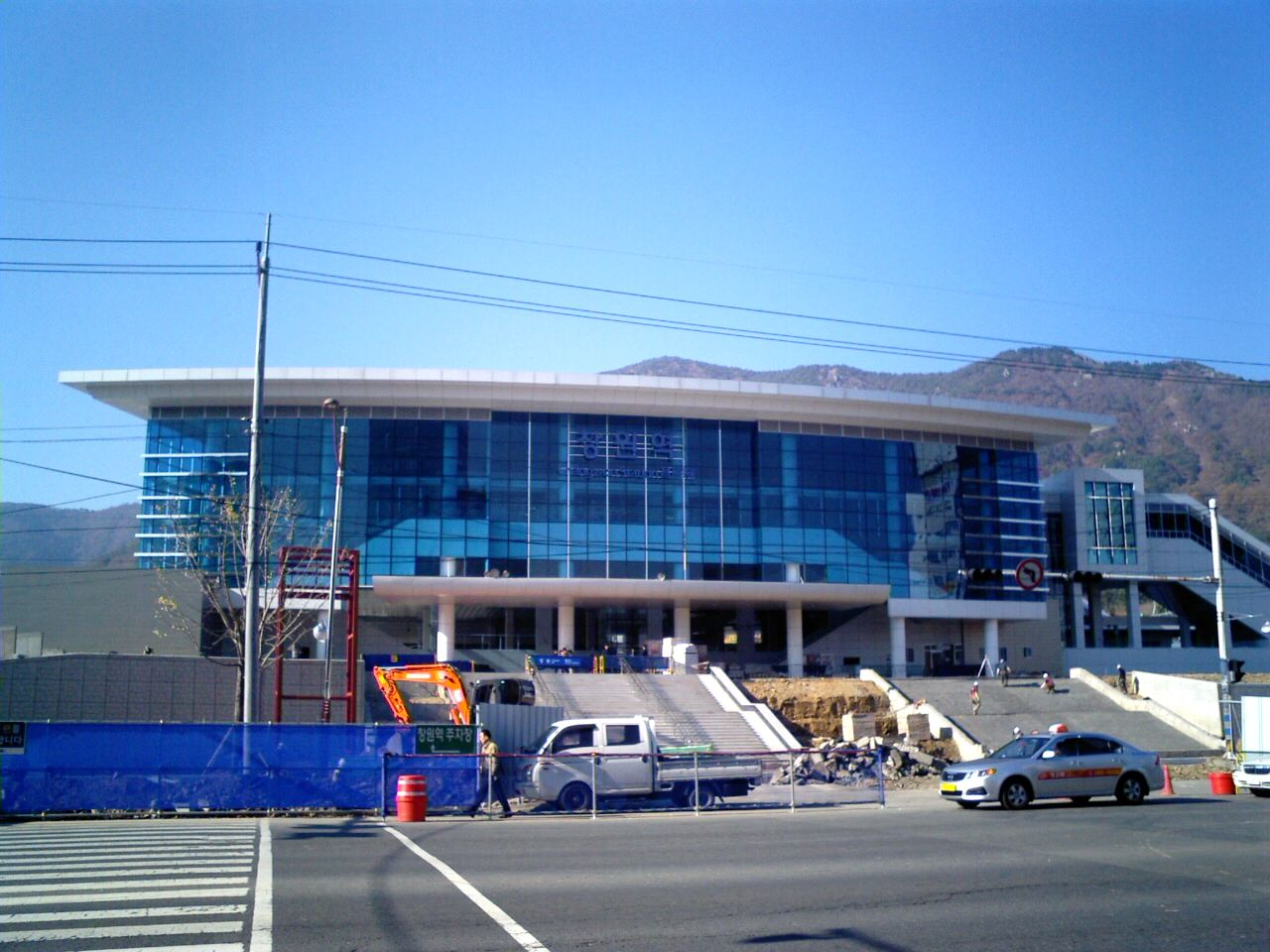

Korean name
- Hangul: 창원역
- Hanja: 昌原驛
- Revised Romanization: Changwonnyeok
- McCune–Reischauer: Changwonnyŏk

General information
- Location: South Korea
- Coordinates: 35.25884°N 128.608532°E
- Operator: Korail
- Lines: Gyeongjeon Line; Jinhae Line

Construction
- Structure type: Aboveground

Services
Preceding station	Korea Train Express	Following station
Changwonjungang towards Haengsin or Suseo	Gyeongjeon KTX	Masan towards Jinju
Preceding station	Korail	Following station
Changwonjungang towards Seoul	ITX-Saemaeul Gyeongjeon Line	Masan towards Jinju
Changwonjungang towards Dongdaegu	ITX-Maum Gyeongjeon Line	Masan towards Jinju
Changwonjungang towards Mokpo	Saemaeul-ho Mokpo–Boseong Line	Masan towards Bujeon
Changwonjungang towards Bujeon or Dongdaegu	Mugunghwa-ho Gyeongjeon Line	Masan towards Jinju or Suncheon
Changwonjungang towards Bujeon	Mugunghwa-ho Mokpo–Boseong Line	Masan towards Mokpo
Location
- Location within South Korea

Changwon Station (Korean: 창원역) is a train station in Changwon, southeast South Korea. It is on the Gyeongjeon Line and the Jinhae Line. KTX service from Seoul to Jinju started with KTX-I / KTX-Sancheon trains on December 15, 2010, with Seoul–Changwon travel times between 2 hours 52 minutes and 2 hours 55 minutes.

== Location ==
The station is centrally located in the Dongjeong-Dong (neighbourhood) of Uichang District in Changwon.

== Station layout ==
=== KORAIL ===
Construction of the new KTX Changwon terminal began on April 24, 2009, and was completed in October, 2010. The new station covers 4,296 square meters and it is equipped with up-to-date automatic ticket vending machines, 3 elevators, 4 escalators, waiting and vending areas. The entire convex curved front of the structure is glass covered and the station is considered an architecturally significant building.

==== Platforms ====
Platform No.	Line	Train	Destination	Other
5	Gyeongjeon Line	KTX / Mugunghwa-ho	For Mokpo·Suncheon·Jinju·Masan	
6	Gyeongjeon Line	KTX / Mugunghwa-ho	For Seoul · Daejeon Dongdaegu·Bujeon·	

== See also ==
- Transportation in South Korea
