= Hyocheon station =

Railway station in South Korea

효천
Hyocheon
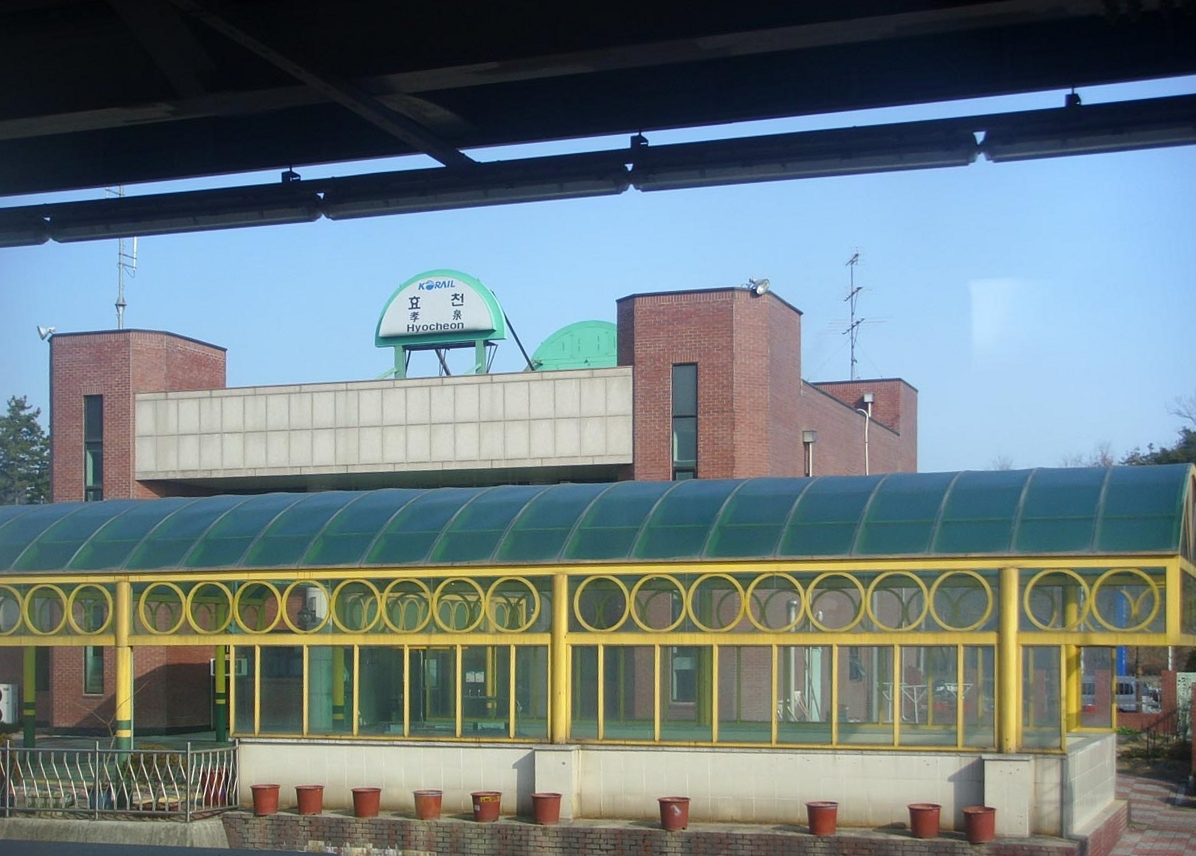

General information
- Location: South Korea
- Coordinates: 35°6′9.94″N 126°52′36.00″E
- Operator: Korail
- Line: Gyeongjeon Line

Construction
- Structure type: Aboveground

Services
Preceding station	Korail	Following station
Hwasun towards Suncheon	Mugunghwa-ho Gyeongjeon Line	Seogwangju towards GwangjuSongjeong
Location
Location within South Korea

Hyocheon Station is a railway station in South Korea. It is on the Gyeongjeon Line.
