= Nakdonggang station =

Railway station in South Korea

Coordinates: 35°23′18.79″N 128°49′48.83″E

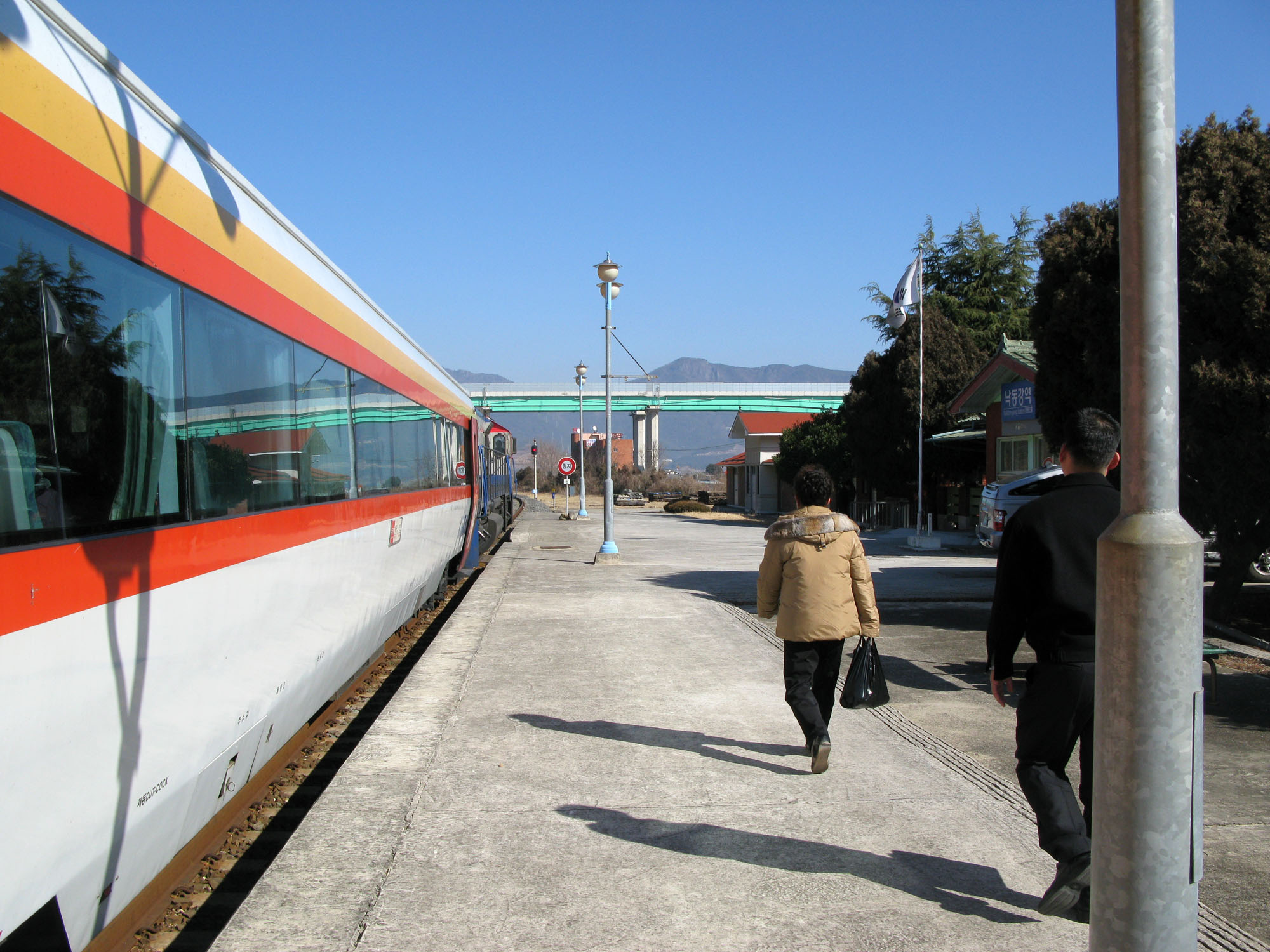
Station Platform

Nakdonggang station (Korean pronunciation: [nakt͈oŋgaŋ]) is a railway station on the Gyeongjeon Line in South Korea.
