= Yusu station =

Railway station in South Korea

Coordinates: 35.1275°N 128.0287°E

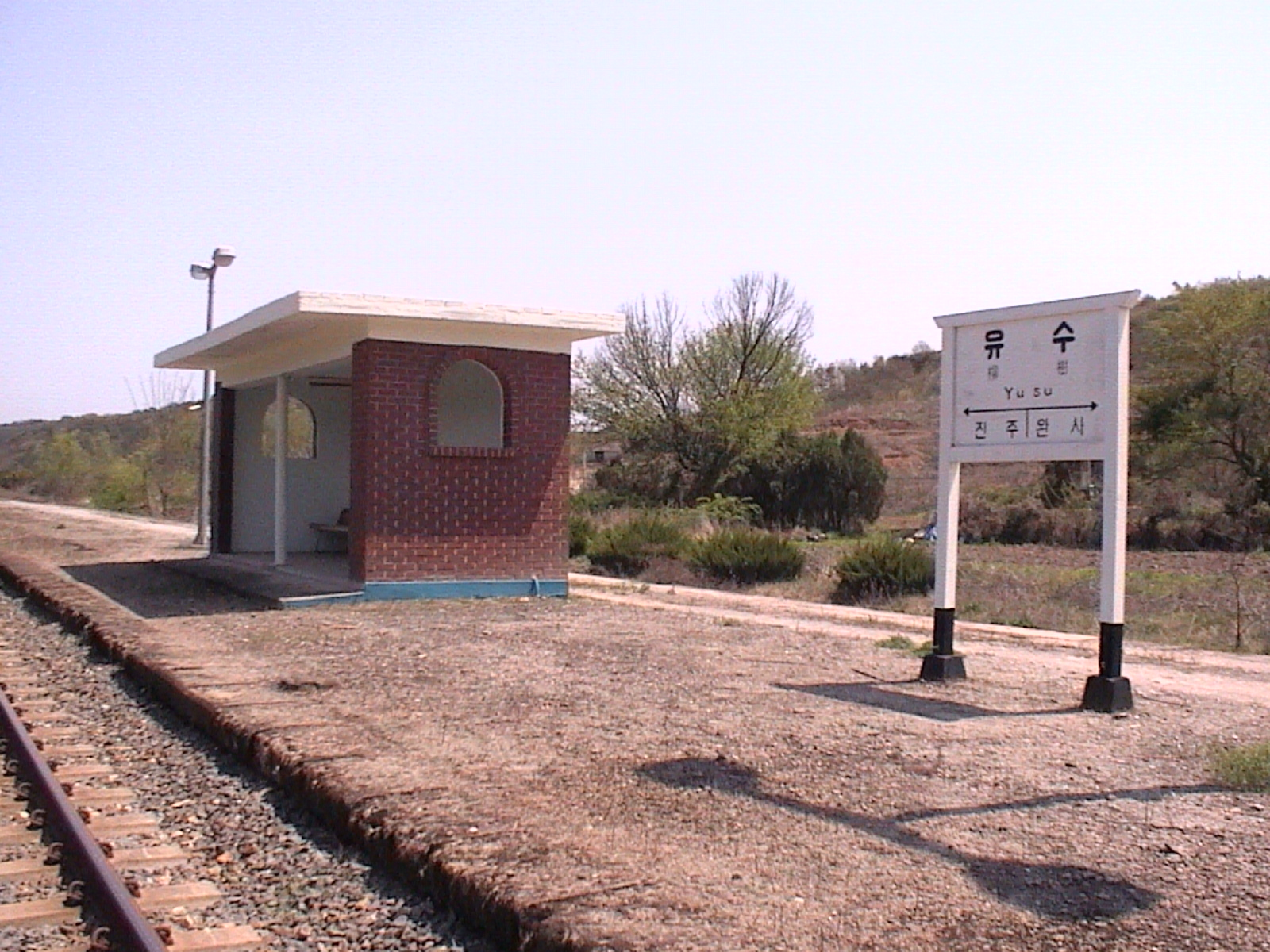
Yusu station

Yusu station(유수역,柳樹驛) was a railway station on the Gyeongjeon Line in South Korea. The station building was demolished in 1986.

== History ==
The station was opened in February of 1967 and it existed between Naedong and Wansa stations.Trains ceased to operate on the station in 2007.The station officially became defunct in 2016.
