= Changwonjungang station =

Railway station in South Korea

창원중앙 (창원대)
Changwonjungang
(Changwon Nat'l Univ.)
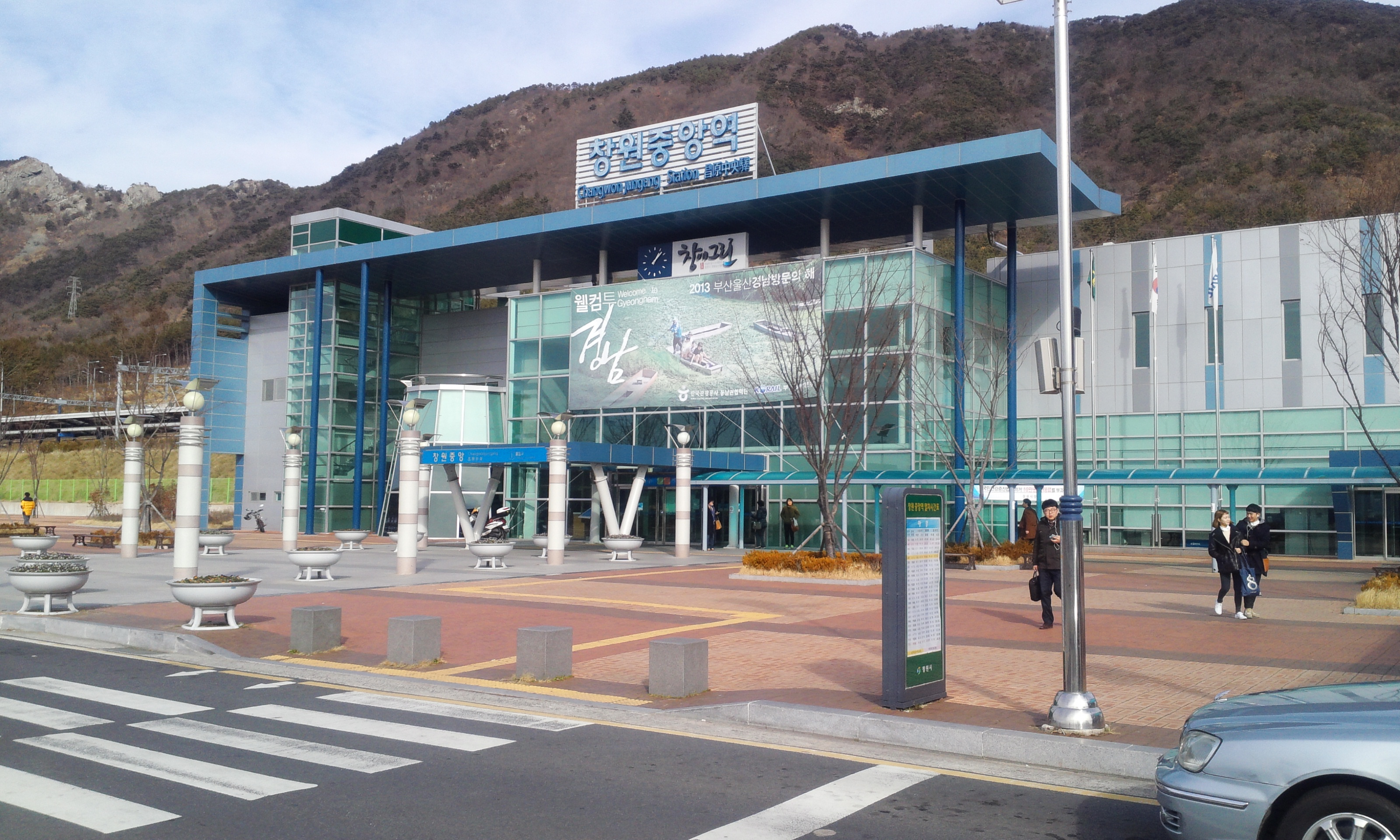

General information
- Location: South Korea
- Coordinates: 35.2422677°N 128.7018634°E
- Operator: Korail
- Line: Gyeongjeon Line

Construction
- Structure type: Aboveground

Services
Preceding station	Korea Train Express	Following station
Jinyeong towards Haengsin or Suseo	Gyeongjeon KTX	Changwon towards Jinju
Preceding station	Korail	Following station
Jinyeong towards Seoul	ITX-Saemaeul Gyeongjeon Line	Changwon towards Jinju
Jillye towards Dongdaegu	ITX-Maum Gyeongjeon Line	Changwon towards Jinju
Samnangjin towards Mokpo	Saemaeul-ho Mokpo–Boseong Line	Changwon towards Bujeon
Jillye towards Bujeon or Dongdaegu	Mugunghwa-ho Gyeongjeon Line	Changwon towards Jinju or Suncheon
Jinyeong towards Bujeon	Mugunghwa-ho Mokpo–Boseong Line	Changwon towards Mokpo
Mulgeum towards Busan	S-Train East	Masan towards Mokpo
Location
- Location within South Korea

Changwonjungang Station (Korean: 창원중앙) is a railway station in South Korea. It is on the Gyeongjeon Line.

== History ==
The station opened on December 15, 2010.

== Services ==
Changwonjungang station serves KTX, ITX-Saemaeul, and Mugunghwa trains on the Gyeongjeon Line.
