= Deoksan station =

Railway station in South Korea

Deoksan station (Korean: 덕산역) is a railway station in South Korea. It was on the Gyeongjeon Line. After double tracking, it became part of the Deoksan Line.
