= Jinju station =

Railway station in Jinju, South Korea

진주
Jinju
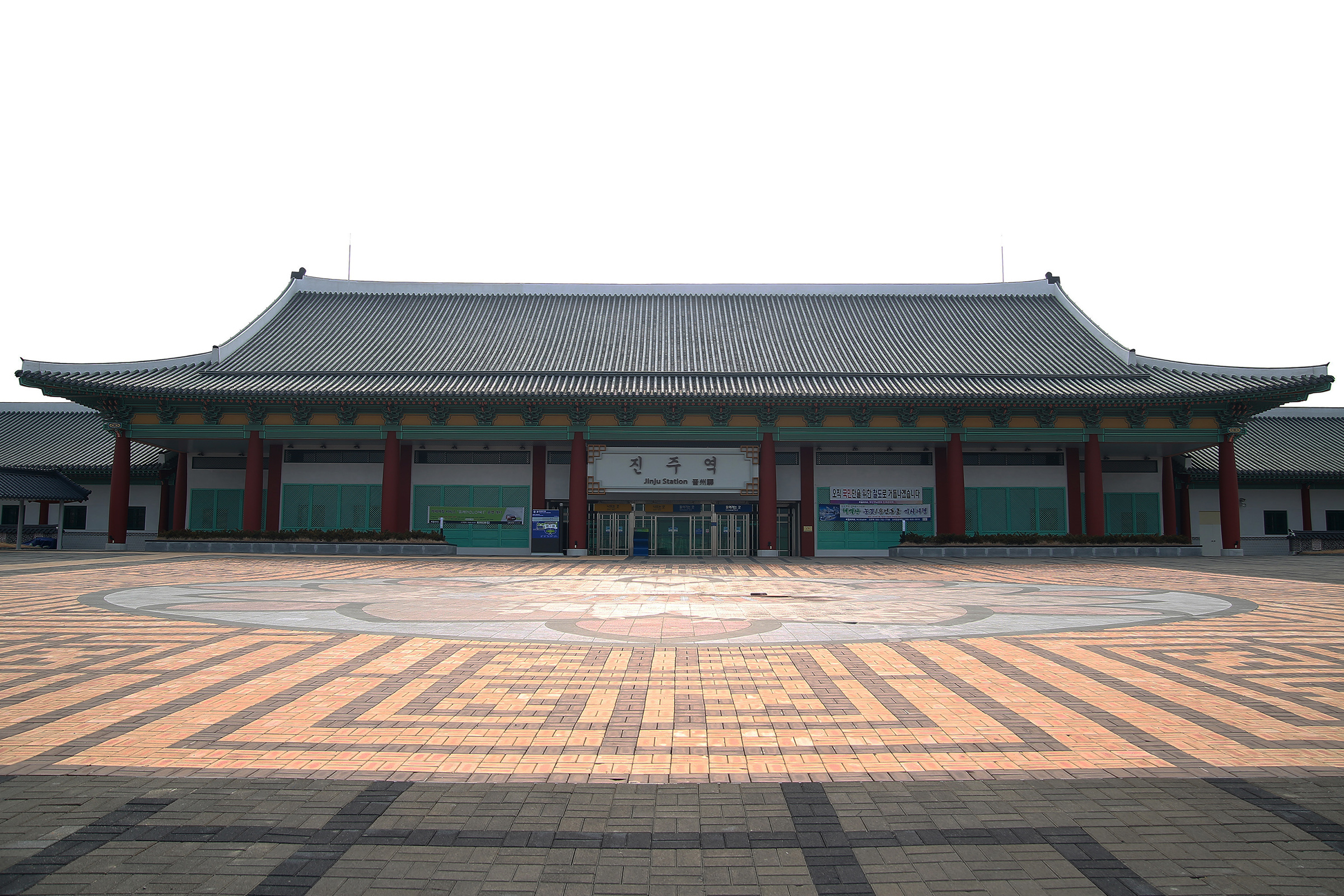

General information
- Location: South Korea
- Coordinates: 35°9′0″N 128°7′5″E
- Operator: Korail
- Line: Gyeongjeon Line

Construction
- Structure type: Aboveground

Services
Preceding station	Korea Train Express	Following station
Masan towards Haengsin or Suseo	Gyeongjeon KTX	Terminus
Preceding station	Korail	Following station
Haman towards Seoul	ITX-Saemaeul Gyeongjeon Line	Terminus
Banseong towards Dongdaegu	ITX-Maum Gyeongjeon Line	Terminus
Hadong towards Mokpo	Saemaeul-ho Mokpo–Boseong Line	Masan towards Bujeon
Banseong towards Dongdaegu	Mugunghwa-ho Gyeongjeon Line	Terminus
Banseong towards Bujeon	Mugunghwa-ho Gyeongjeon Line	Wansa towards Suncheon
Banseong towards Bujeon	Mugunghwa-ho Mokpo–Boseong Line	Wansa towards Mokpo
Masan towards Busan	S-Train East	Hadong towards Mokpo
Location
- Location within South Korea

Jinju Station is a railway station in Jinju, South Korea, and is a stop along the Gyeongjeon Line. KTX service from Seoul to Jinju started with KTX-I / KTX-Sancheon trains on December 5, 2012. This route covers approximately 330 kilometers.

The station consists of a small two-story building with a small retail area on the ground floor. Near the station is an old brick train shed. A small train yard is next to the station.

The station serves regular passenger rail & KTX services by Korail.
