= Gyeongjeon Line =

Railway line serving South Gyeongsang and South Jeolla Provinces in South Korea

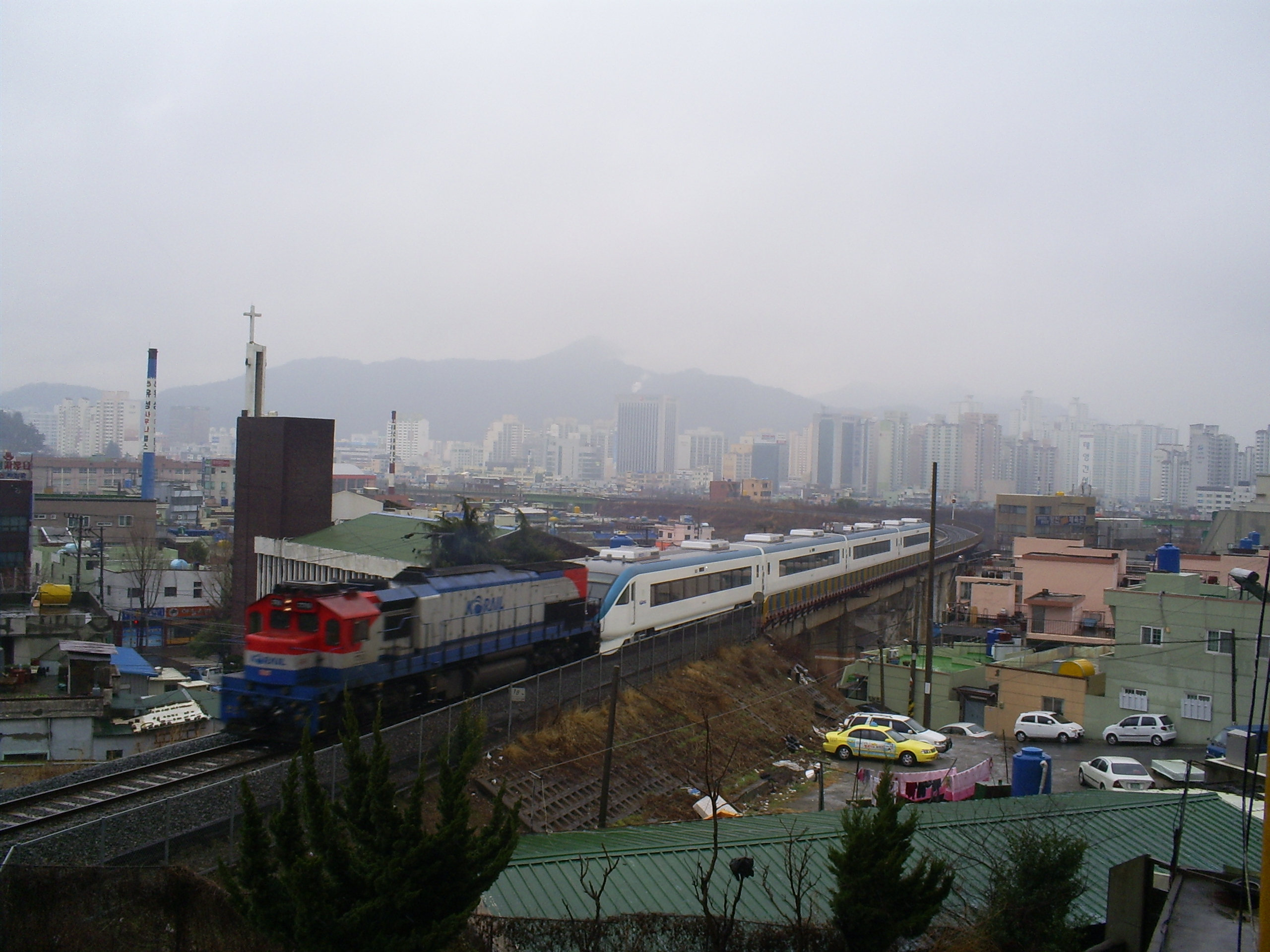
- A train on the Gyeongjeon Line in March 2009

Overview
- Native name: 경전선(慶全線)
- Status: Operational
- Owner: Korea Rail Network Authority
- Locale: South Gyeongsang; South Jeolla; Gwangju
- Termini: Samnangjin; Gwangju Songjeong
- Stations: 45

Service
- Type: Heavy rail, Passenger/Freight rail Regional rail, Intercity rail
- Operator: Korail

History
- Opened: Stages between 1905 and 1968

Technical
- Line length: 289.5 km (179.9 mi)
- Number of tracks: Double track (Nakdonggang - Jinju, Gwangyang - Suncheon); Single track
- Track gauge: 1,435 mm (4 ft 8 1/2 in) standard gauge
- Electrification: 25 kV/60 Hz AC catenary (Samnangjin - Jinju, Gwangyang - Suncheon)
Route map
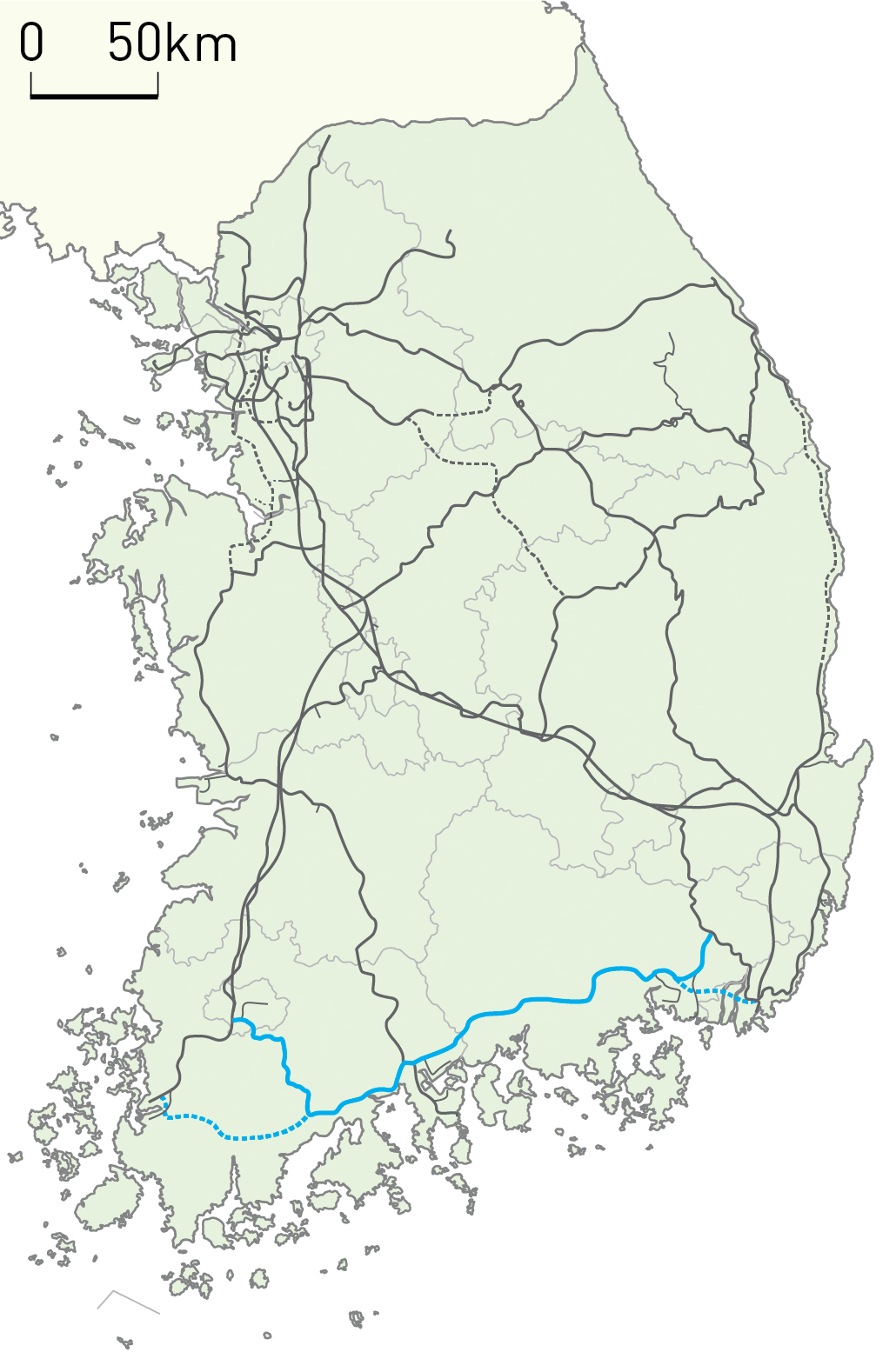

- Gyeongjeon Line
- Hangul: 경전선
- Hanja: 慶全線
- RR: Gyeongjeonseon
- MR: Kyŏngjŏnsŏn

The Gyeongjeon Line (Korean: 경전선) is a railway line serving South Gyeongsang and South Jeolla Provinces in South Korea. It covers a total of 300.6 km, from Samnangjin Station in Miryang, South Gyeongsang, to Gwangju Songjeong Station in Gwangju, South Jeolla.

== History ==
An east-west railway along Korea's southern shore was long seen as a strategic route, but it took a number of attempts to complete the line. The first section of the line was opened as a branch from the newly built Gyeongbu Line at Samnangjin to Masan in May 1905, which was named the Masan Line. On December 1, 1923, the Jinju Line opened from Masan to Jinju, extending the line to 110.2 km (68.5 mi). A branch from Changwon on the Masan Line to Jinhae, the Jinhae Line, opened on November 11, 1926.

Meanwhile, construction started in the opposite direction from Songjeong-ri (today Gwangju·Songjeong) on the Honam Line, the other end of the future Gyeongjeon Line, with the first 14.9 km (9.3 mi) to Gwangju opened in July 1922. The 155.5 km (96.6 mi) Gwangju Line was completed to Yeosu on December 25, 1930. Six years later, on December 16, 1936, the Suncheon–Yeosu section became part of the newly established Jeolla Line, leaving the 134.6 km (83.6 mi) long Songjeong-ri–Suncheon section as the Gwangju Line.

Following the 1961 coup, the Supreme Council for National Reconstruction started South Korea's first five-year plan, which included a construction program to complete the railway network, to foster economic growth. As part of the program, work began on a line to plug the gap between Jinju and Suncheon on April 28, 1962. The difficult 80.5 km (50.0 mi) long section included 38 bridges with a total length of 1,697 m (5,568 ft) and 27 tunnels with a total length of 7.67 km (4.77 mi), as well as 13 new stations. The Jinju–Suncheon line opened on February 7, 1968, when the whole 325.2 km (202.1 mi) railway line from Samnangjin to Songjeong-ri was renamed the Gyeongjeon Line. By the mid-2000s, alignment modifications shortened the line length to 300.6 km (186.8 mi).

=== Upgrade ===
The line is being upgraded to an electrified and double-tracked line for higher speeds in stages, to facilitate regional development. On September 1, 2010, the South Korean government announced a strategic plan to reduce travel times from Seoul to 95% of the country to under 2 hours by 2020. As part of the plan, the entire Gyeongjeon Line was to be further upgraded for 230 km/h.

==== Samnangjin-Masan-Jinju ====
The upgraded section is 101.4 km long. The 41 km section until Masan includes a re-alignment with tunnels closer to Changwon, the Masan–Jinju section also includes significant re-alignments along the way.

The project was implemented as a public-private partnership: the government contribution is 1,680.473 billion won, private capital contributes 338.309 billion won. By April 2009, construction progress reached 50.9% of the planned budget of 2,018.782 billion won. The Samnangjin-Masan section opened on December 15, 2010, the Masan–Jinju section followed on October 23, 2012. The design speed of this section is 200 km/h.

==== Jinju-Suncheon ====
Work started in 2003 on a 56.1 km long section between Jinju and Gwangyang. By March 2010, progress was 19% out of a budget of 1,005.984 billion won. This section includes significant re-alignments with longer tunnels and bridges. The upgrade works also commenced at the junction with the Jeolla Line east of Suncheon, this section opened on September 30, 2015. The first track of the realigned Jinju-Gwangjang section opened on April 29, 2016, followed by the second track on July 14, 2016. Electrification was put in operation on June 23, 2023. The design speed of this section is 150 km/h.

==== Suncheon-GwangjuSongjeong ====
Between Hyocheon and GwangjuSongjeong, to relieve congestion at road crossings in the city, the Gyeongjeon Line got a new alignment bypassing Gwangju to the south. The section of the old alignment between GwangjuSongjeong and Gwangju was upgraded as a 11.9 km (7.4 mi) spur line, again called the Gwangju Line, while the 10.8 km (6.7 mi) section between Hyocheon and Gwangju, including Namgwangju Station, was torn up. The realignments opened on August 10, 2000.

The rest of the Suncheon-Gwangju section is foreseen for upgrading in a new 230 km/h alignment under the government's 2010 plan for 2020. A decade later, only plans for single-track electrification were drawn up.

==== Connected projects ====
A new 44.8 km (27.8 mi) long branch from Hallimjeong Station was projected to improve freight transport connections to Busan's expanded port. The line proper to Busan New Port Station is 38.8 km (24.1 mi) long, followed by 6.0 km (3.7 mi) of port access tracks. Part of the alignment became part of the Gyeongjeon Line realignment, shortening the branch and changing the starting point to Jillye. By April 2009, progress was 80.7% out of a total budget of 902.384 billion won. The line was opened on November 30, 2010 and the first freight train travelled the line on December 13, 2010. On January 1 and 31, 2013, two single-track non-electrified branches opened: the 7.7 km (4.8 mi) New Port South Line to Namcheol Songjiang and the 5.8 km (3.6 mi) New Port North Line to Bukcheolsong.

A new direct connection from Busan will meet up with the realigned Gyeongjeon Line southwest of Jillye, with a connection to the Busan New Port Line at Jangyu Station. The 32.6 km long double-track cutoff had a budget of 1,396.15 billion won, and was implemented with private finance, the preferred bidder for the franchise was selected in July 2010. This line was foreseen for an upgrade to 230 km/h under the government's 2010 plan for 2020. Construction started in 2014, after design changes and construction problems, opening is scheduled for the first half of 2025.

From Boseong, a new cutoff branch is to connect with the Honam Line at Imseong-ri, just before Mokpo. Construction of the 79.5 km long aingle-track branch commenced in 2002, however, work was suspended in 2007 for lack of funds, after having progressed to 5.5% of the 1,297.924 billion won budget. Construction resumed in 2015, plans were upgraded with the addition of electrification and a top speed of 200 km/h in 2019, with opening scheduled for December 2024. This branch includes the 5,960 m long Jangdong Tunnel northeast of Jangheung.

== Main stations ==
In Gyeongsangnam-do:

- Samnangjin Station, Miryang, junction with the Gyeongbu Line
- Changwon Station, Changwon, terminus of the Jinhae Line
- Masan Station, Masan
- Jinju Station, Jinju
- Hadong Station, Hadong County

In Jeollanam-do:

- Gwangyang Station, Gwangyang, terminus of the planned Gwangyang Port branch
- Suncheon Station, Suncheon, junction with the Jeolla Line
- Beolgyo Station, Boseong County
- Boseong Station, Boseong County, terminus of a planned line to Mokpo
- Gwangju Songjeong Station, Gwangju, junction with the Honam Line and terminus of the Gwangju Line branch to Gwangju station

=== Defunct stations ===
The following stations formerly on the Gyeongjeon Line are now defunct:

- Aengnam Station
- Dorim Station
- Gaeyang Station
- Galchon Station
- Goryak Station
- Gyowon Station
- Ipgyo Station
- Jinju-sumogwon Station
- Mansu Station
- Naedong Station
- Sanin Station
- Seokjeong-ri Station
- Sudeok Station
- Yusu station

== Services ==
The line is served by passenger and freight trains. As of October 2010, from Bujeon station in Busan, cross-country Mugunghwa-ho trains travel in a minimum 1 hour 25 minutes to Masan, 2 hour 55 minutes to Jinju, 4 hours 20 minutes to Suncheon, 6 hours 33 minutes to Gwangju·Songjeong, and 7 hours 34 minutes to Mokpo, while the travel time with transfer from KTX high-speed trains at Miryang is as short as 3 hours 15 minutes.

=== Gyeongjeon KTX ===
KTX service from Seoul to Masan started with KTX-II trains on December 15, 2010, with Seoul–Masan travel times between of 2 hours 54 minutes and 2 hours 59 minutes, depending on the stopping pattern. The service started with 14 daily trains on weekdays and 24 on weekends (Friday to Sunday), with standard class Seoul–Masan tickets costing 47,400 won on weekdays and 50,700 won on weekends. In the first month of service, express bus services between Seoul and Masan or Changwon experienced 30–40% drops in ridership. Korail added an extra pair of Monday morning trains on from January 17, 2011.

After leaving the Gyeongbu High Speed Railway, the Gyeongjeon KTX service stops at the following stations:

Station (Hangul, Hanja)	Connecting services	Station distance	Distance from Seoul	Station time	Time from Seoul	Location
Station (Hangul, Hanja)	Connecting services	km		min		Location
Dongdaegu (동대구, 東大邱)	Gyeongbu Line; Daegu Line; Daegu Subway Line 1	-	293.1	-	108–117	Dong-gu, Daegu-gwangyeoksi
Miryang (밀양, 密陽)	Gyeongbu Line	55.3	348.4	32	140–146	Miryang-si, Gyeongsangnam-do
Jinyeong (진영, 進永)	Gyeongjeon Line	25.0	373.4	17	157–159	Gimhae-si, Gyeongsangnam-do
Changwonjungang (창원중앙, 昌原中央)	Gyeongjeon Line	14.1	387.5	11	161–170	Changwon-si, Gyeongsangnam-do
Changwon (창원, 昌原)	Gyeongjeon Line; Jinhae Line	10.3	397.8	8	172–175	Changwon-si, Gyeongsangnam-do
Masan (마산, 馬山)	Gyeongjeon Line; Masanhang Budu Line 1	3.6	401.4	4	170–179	Masan-si, Gyeongsangnam-do
Jinju (진주, 晉州)	Gyeongjeon Line	49.3	450.7	24	201-217	Jinju-si, Gyeongsangnam-do

The service was extended to Jinju from December 5, 2012, and may cover the entire line after further upgrades under the government's 2010 plan for 2020.

SRT also started operating high-speed services on the eastern section to Jinju on September 1, 2023.

== Branch lines ==
- Jinhae Line: The Jinhae line, going from Changwon Station to Tonghae Station via Jinhae, Sinchangwon, Namchangwon, and Seongjusa Stations, is a defunct railway running through the center of Changwon City. Regular passenger services of Mugunghwa-ho trains ceased in 2014 due to low passenger counts, and special passenger trains serving passengers for the Jinhae Cherry Blossom Festival (진해 군항제) ceased in 2015. Changwon City is currently planning to reuse the Jinhae Line as part of Line 2 of the Changwon City Tram network.
  - Imhang Line: The Imhang line is an abandoned railway formerly running from Masan Station to the south towards Masan Harbour. Serving as a cargo railway since it opened after the old Gyeongjeon Line track was moved towards the suburbs of Masan City in 1977, After the partial electrification of the Gyeongjeon Line and the moving of the track, the Imhang Line was officially declared abandoned in January 2012. It is currently part of a municipal park known as 'Imhang Line Greenway' as of 2024.
  - Haengam Line
- Gwangyangjecheol Line
- Gwangyanghang Line
- Gwangju Line
- Singwangyanghang Line
- Busansinhang Line
  - Sinhangbuk Line
  - Sinhangnam Line
- Deoksan Line
- Jeongyeong Triangular Line

== See also ==
- Korail
- Transportation in South Korea
