= Seo Il-ok =

Korean sijo poet (born 1951)

- Born: 1951 (age 74–75) Changwon, South Korea
- Occupation: Poet
- Period: 1990–present
- Genre: Sijo

Sŏ Ir-ok (or Seo Il-ok; born 1951) is a Korean sijo poet. Since her debut as a poet in 1990, she has written realist sijo poems with gritty descriptions of Korean society, based on her interest in the marginalized.

== Biography ==
Seo was born in 1951, in Changwon (formerly Masan), South Gyeongsang Province. In her early years, she had a hard time longing for her mother before she began writing. While she attended Masan Girls High School, she participated in the club called Dotseom Literature and practiced her writing. She founded the Masan Sijo Literature Club in 1982 with Kim Gyo-han, Lee U-geol, Kim Bok-geun, Hong Jin-gi, Yang Gye-hyang, and others, and worked as a founding member .

In 1990, her poem "Buksori (북소리, Drumming Sound)" won the sijo category of the Gyeongnam Ilbo New Writer's Contest (《경남신문》 신춘문예). Also, her poem "Bulkkotnori (불꽃놀이, Fireworks)" was recommended in the literary journal Sijomunhak, and her children's poem "Songeoul (손거울, Hand Mirror)" won the Korea Children's Literature New Writer's Contest (《한국아동문학연구》 신인상). Seo published three sijo poetry collections, Yeonghwa seukechi (영화 스케치, Movie Sketches) in 2003, Geuneurui munui (그늘의 무늬, Patterns on Shadows) in 2013, Byeongsan Ucheguk (병산 우체국, Byeongsan Post Office) in 2016; one children's sijo poetry collection Supeseo janeun baram (숲에서 자는 바람, The Wind Sleeping in the Woods).

She served as the president of the Gyeognam Sijo Poets Association from 2007 to 2010, and, in 2011, got elected as the head of the Sijo Department of the Gyeongnam Writers Association. In 2012, she was appointed as the head of the Changnyeong District Office of Education in Gyeongsangnam-do. Seo participated in the 2014 World Children's Literature Convention and presented her poetry collection Supeseo janeun baram. In 2015, she was elected as the president of the Masan Writers Association and also as the vice president of the Gyeongnam Writers Association and the Masan Confederation of Art and Culture Organizations. In 2017, she became the director of the Gyeongnam Literary House.

[2]

Seo won the Gyeongnam Sijo Literature Award (경남시조문학상) in 2003, the Seongpa Sijo Literature Award (성파시조문학상) in 2004, the Garam Sijo Literature Award (가람시조문학상) in 2015, and the Yun Dongju Literature Award in 2018.

== Writing ==
The most prominent feature of Seo's poetry is its detachment from the idealism of the traditional sijo, its realism. The realism of her poetry stems from her attempt to create her own unique sijo aesthetics that abides the syllabic verse rules and reflects the reality at the same time.

=== From family to history ===
One of the most revisited subject matters in Seo's poetry is mother. "Mother's Room," the second chapter of her poetry collection Geuneurui munui, includes poems related to mother: in "Eommaneun (엄마는, Mom)," the narrator depicts her mother who cannot recognize her granddaughter because of old age; "Eomeoni-ui bang (어머니의 방, Mother's Room)" tells the story of a daughter who is changing the diapers of her old mother; in "Bab (밥, Meal)," a mother, having grown up in a poor household, eats endlessly after getting ill.

The family stories described in Seo's poems are distinctive, because they are not just about her own life experience, but about the collective history. For example, in "Gotgam (곶감, Dried Persimmon)," an aunt, who had to see six of her children die, loses her last son to the Vietnam War, and with her story the poem develops the experience of an individual into a larger matter of history. In "Jirisan Gosamok (지리산 고사목, The Old Tree in Jirisan Mountain)," the narrator's father—a victim of the civilian massacre that occurred in Jirisan Mountain around the time of the Korean War—is described as a person who is trying to erase "the sad history" by never closing his eyes after death. The historical event alluded in the poem is also connected to "3 wol, Masaneun (3월, 마산은, Masan in March)," which delineates the protest of the Masan citizens against the rigged election held on March 15, 1960 and the ensuing suppression and massacre of civilians.

=== From history to reality ===
The poet's interest goes beyond the scope of family, to that of other people and the whole society. Her poem "Nina (니나, Nina)" is the story of a foreign worker named Nina who dies of pneumonia in a poor labor environment. Also, "Sugure Gukbab (수구레 국밥, Tough Beef Rice Soup)" compares rice soup prepared by a Vietnamese woman and her Korean mother-in-law in a market restaurant to a "holy feast for the hearts of farmers," showing an embracing attitude towards immigrants and farmers, two of the marginalized groups in Korea.

Her interest in reality is materialized in more realistic poems that are directly related to real life events. The poem "Gujeyeok (구제역, Foot-and-mouth Disease)" tells the story of the three million domestic animals that had to be buried alive due to the nationwide spread of foot-and-mouth disease in 2011 and farmers who had to suffer from it. "Sageon (사건, The accident)" depicts a gireogi father, which means a father who he lives alone as the rest of his family is abroad due to the children's education. In the end, he is killed by a fire at the efficiency apartment building where he lives. Through this poem, Seo tells the tragic story of a family, but also points out the excessive enthusiasm towards education in the country—the booming early education and the fierce competition for university entry.

== Works ==
=== Sijo poetry collections ===
《영화 스케치》, 고요아침, 2003 / Yeonghwa seukechi (Movie Sketches), Goyoachim, 2003

《그늘의 무늬》, 고요아침, 2013 / Geuneurui munui (Patterns on Shadows), Goyoachim, 2013

《병산 우체국》, 고요아침, 2016 / Byeongsan Ucheguk (Byeongsan Post Office), Goyoachim, 2016

=== Children's Sijo poetry collections ===
《숲에서 자는 바람》, 고요아침, 2013 / Supeseo janeun baram (The Wind Sleeping in the Woods), Goyoachim, 2013

== Awards ==
Gyeongnam Sijo Literature Award (경남시조문학상, 2003) for her poem "Nina"

Hanguk Sijo Poet Association Award (한국시조시인협회상, 2004)

Seongpa Sijo Literature Award (성파시조문학상, 2004) for her poem "Mia chatgi jeondanjireul bomyeo (미아찾기 전단지를 보며, Looking at a Missing Child Flyer)

Literature Category, Masan-si Culture Award (마산시문화상 문학부문, 2008)

Gyeongnam Children's Literature Award (경남아동문학상, 2013) for her poetry collection Supeseo janeun baram

Kim Daljin Changwon Literature Award (김달진창원문학상, 2013) for her poetry collection Geuneurui munui

Garam Sijo Literature Award (가람시조문학상, 2015) for her poetry collection Byeongsan Ucheguk

Yun Dongju Literature Award (2018) for her poem "Gunsan (군산, Gunsan)"
