= Jindong-myeon, Changwon =

Jindong-myeon
- Myeon (township)
- Location in South Korea
- Coordinates: 35.12943°N 128.50759°E
- Country: South Korea
- Province: South Gyeongsang Province
- City: Changwon
- District: Masanhappo-gu
- Time zone: UTC+9 (Korea Standard)

Korean name
- Hangul: 진동면
- Hanja: 鎭東面
- RR: Jindong-myeon
- MR: Chindong-myŏn

Jindong-myeon (Korean: 진동면) is a myeon (township) under the administration of Masanhappo-gu, Changwon, South Gyeongsang Province, South Korea. As of 2020, it administers the following ten villages:

- Jindong-ri (진동리, 鎭東里)
- Gohyeon-ri (고현리, 古縣里)
- Singi-ri (신기리, 新基里)
- Sadong-ri (사동리, 社洞里)
- Yojang-ri (요장리, 蓼場里)
- Dagu-ri (다구리, 多求里)
- Gyodong-ri (교동리, 校洞里)
- Taebong-ri (태봉리, 台封里)
- Ingok-ri (인곡리, 仁谷里)
- Dongjeon-ri (동전리, 東田里)
