= Seongsan District =

- Non-autonomous District
- Interactive map of Seongsan District
- Country: South Korea
- Region: Yeongnam

Area
  - Total: 81.34 km^{2} (31.41 sq mi)

Population (2010)
  - Total: 245,961
  - Density: 3,023.86/km^{2} (7,831.8/sq mi)
  - Dialect: South Gyeongsang Province

Korean name
- Hangul: 성산구
- Hanja: 城山區
- RR: Seongsan-gu
- MR: Sŏngsan-gu

Seongsan District (Korean: 성산구) is a district of Changwon, South Korea.

== See also ==
- Changwon
- Uichang District
- Masan-Hoiwon-gu
- Masan-Happho-gu
- Jinhae District
