= Masan Gagopa Chrysanthemum Festival =

Flower festival in South Korea

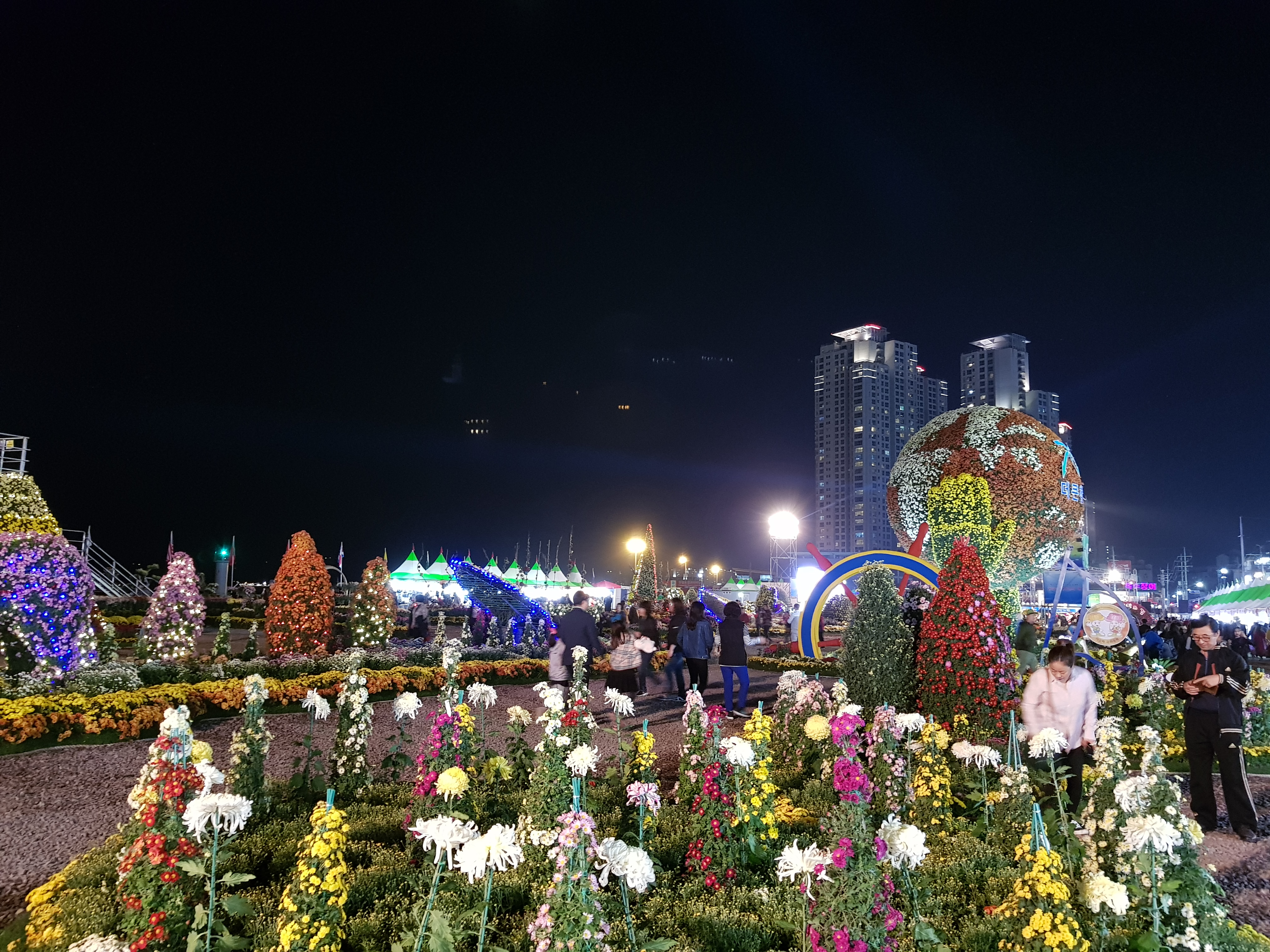
- The gala event of the Masan Gagopa Chrysanthemum Festival
- Dates: Late October ~ Early November
- Locations: Changwon, South Korea
- Years active: 2000 – Present
- Founders: Masan City

The Masan Gagopa Chrysanthemum Festival (Korean: 마산가고파 국화축제) is a flower festival celebrating the excellence of the chrysanthemum held since 2000.

It is held annually in Masanhappo-gu, Changwon, South Gyeongsang Province. The festival features a song contest, an essay contest, and a Si-nangsong (poetry recitation) contest. About 1.5 million tourists visit during the festival.

Originally named 'Masan Chrysanthemum Festival', it changed its name to the 'Masan Chrysanthemum Exhibition' in 2002. In 2005, the festival changed its name to the 'Masan Gagopa Chrysanthemum Festival'.
