= Bong-Ki Han =

Creator of WonHwaDo martial art (1944–2010)

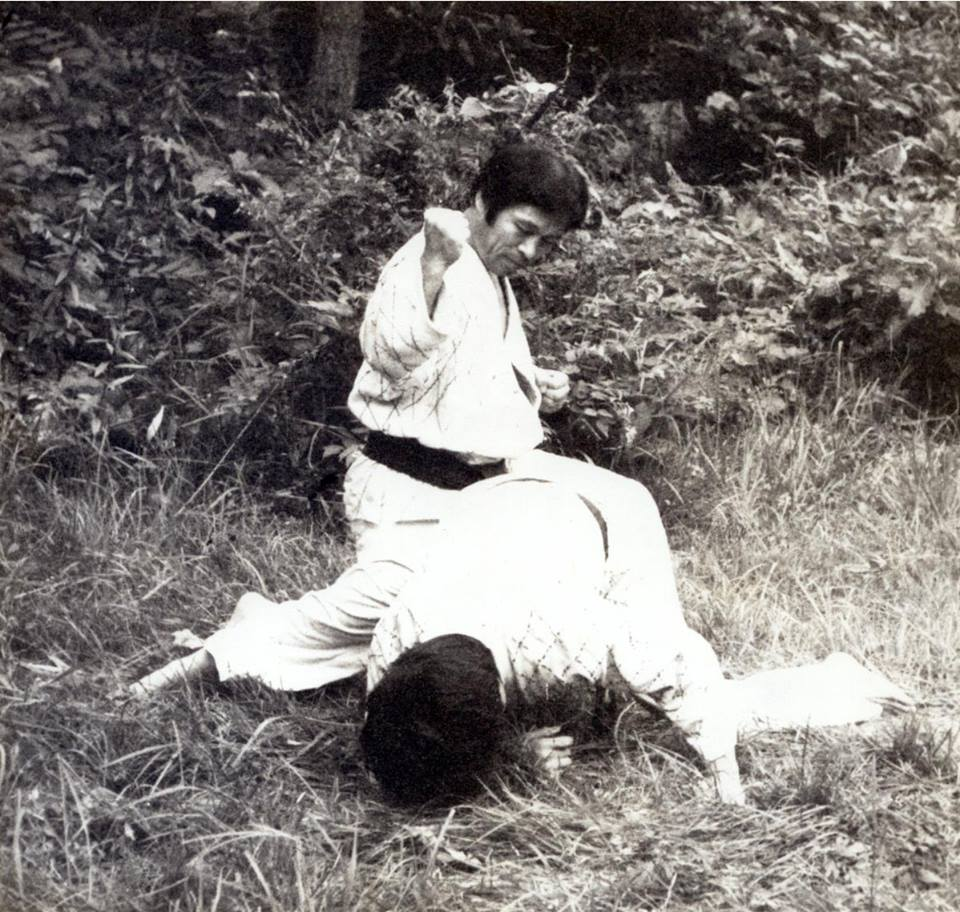
- Born: April 26, 1944; Osaka, Japan
- Died: February 10, 2010 (aged 65); Masan, GyeongSangDo, Korea due to Cancer
- Native name: 한봉기 Han Bong-Ki
- Nationality: Korea
- Style: WonHwaDo
- Rank: Grand Master

Other information
- Children: Hyun Seok Han (Master)

Bong-ki Han (Korean: 봉기한; Hanja: 漢封機; April 26, 1944 – February 10, 2010, alternative spelling Han Bong-Gi) is known as founder and creator of WonHwaDo (원화도; 圓花道).

He pioneered WonHwaDo not only across most parts of his homeland Korea but also across stretches of Europe as well. A fiery, philosophical and sometimes controversial character meant that it was often his character as well as his skill that attracted many disciples. As a martial artist he took from Miyamoto Musashi's idea that true mastery only comes about when one is able to master art, calligraphy, dance as well as other aspects of daily life. Therefore, WonHwaDo attracted not only those interested in self-defense but also those interested in dance as well as other aspects of Korean Culture such as meditation and Korean style Yoga.

== Biography ==
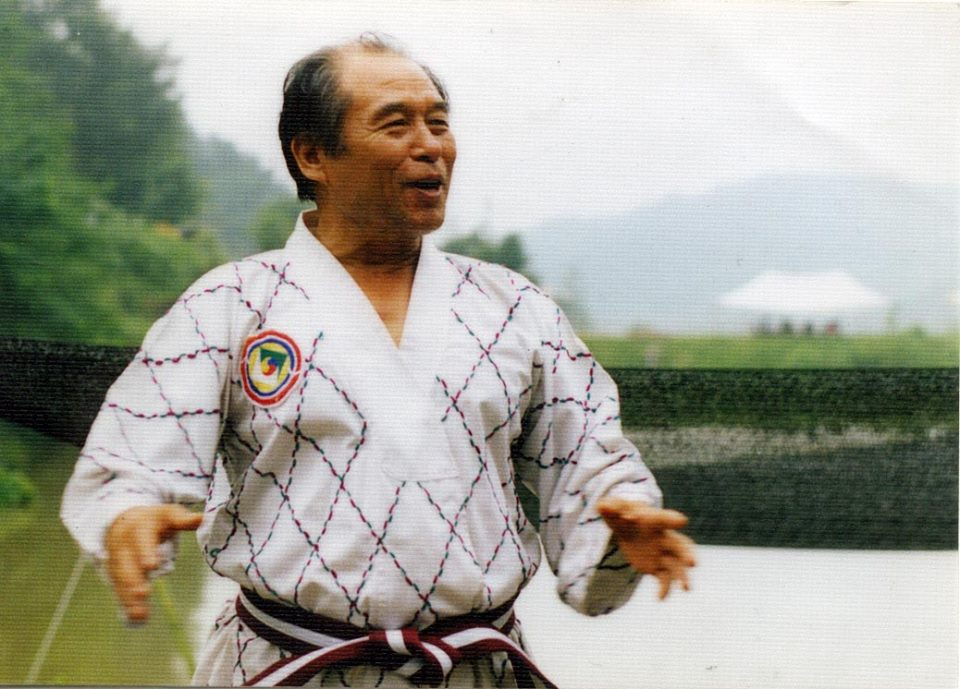
Great Grand Master Han giving a lecture

Bong-Ki Han was born in Osaka, Japan 26 April 1944. After the Korean War ended Bong-Ki Han returned to his homeland and settled in Masan, Gyeongsang Province. Bong-Ki Han was an avid student of the martial arts and trained in Judo a lot in this period. Bong-Ki also trained in the sport of Horizontal Bar which gave him an abnormal grip and core strength which he later applied to his techniques. During his military service he met taekwondo masters and exchanged skills with them. After he finished his military service, Bong-Ki Han went to the mountains and spent time with a Buddhist priest to develop his mind and spirit.

== Meeting Ik-Hun Cho ==
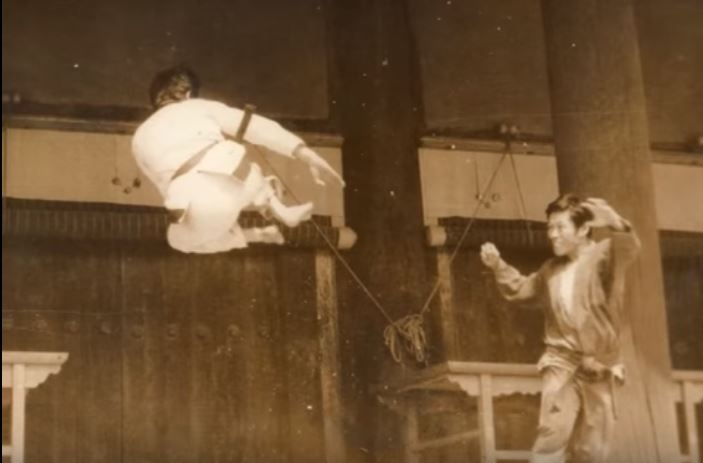

In the year 1972 Bong-Ki Han met Ik-Hun Cho, who was a young but prominent and highly skilled Master of Korean martial arts. At the time the Bong-Ki Han felt inclined to train and understand the art. Ik-Hun Cho and Bong-Ki Han grew very close during this time and as a Grand Master that had met many incredible masters, he was amazed by Bong-Ki Han's wisdom and knowledge. Ik-Hun wanted to know if Bong-Ki Han was legitimate so he often tested him by arranging meetings with high ranking soldiers, masters of different martial arts to see how Bong-Ki Han would react. Whether it was a spar or a conversation, Bong-Ki Han held his own and won over the respect of every person. It was from this period that Ik-Hun Cho decided he would follow Bong-Ki Han in developing what was then known as 'WonHwaSul' soon to be renamed as 'WonHwaDo'. As Bong-Ki Han would demonstrate the techniques Ik-Hun Cho would draw them. These drawings still exist today and were published into a book.

== Establishing the World WonHwaDo Federation ==
In 2003, The World WonHwaDo Federation was officially recognized and established as a traditional martial art by the Korean Government. Bong-Ki Han struggled for many years to achieve this but the Korean Government recognized and acknowledged WonHwaDo for its success in growing in countries like Germany, Slovakia and Great Britain. Korean Air sponsored European WonHwaDo Festival in 2001 because of masses of Europeans coming to Korea on a yearly basis to participate in seminars with Bong-Ki Han. Furthermore, in Korea there is a martial arts festival in which all of Korea's recognized martial arts take part and organize demonstrations for large audiences. Won Hwa Do in 1998 garnered one of the largest foreign audiences seen due to its overseas reach. At the time this for any Korea martial art besides TaeKwonDo or Hapkido was unprecedented.

== Death ==
On 10 February 2010, Bong-Ki Han died after a long battle with cancer. In the buildup to his passing Bong-Ki Han was under severe stress from disagreements with his pupils and the stagnation of WonHwaDo's growth. Before his passing he left the leadership of the World WonHwaDo federation to his son and other key leaders. The Federation now spreads to Japan, Germany, Slovakia, Lithuania, England and Malaysia. Every year a memorial ceremony is held in remembrance of his life dedicated to the growth of WonHwaDo.
