= Uichang District =

- Non-autonomous District
- Location within South Korea
- Country: South Korea
- Region: Yeongnam
- Administrative divisions: 5 dong, 1 Eup, 2 Myeon

Area
  - Total: 211.38 km^{2} (81.61 sq mi)

Population (2025)
  - Total: 209,516
  - Density: 991.18/km^{2} (2,567.1/sq mi)
  - Dialect: South Gyeongsang Province

Korean name
- Hangul: 의창구
- Hanja: 義昌區
- RR: Uichang-gu
- MR: Ŭich'ang-gu

Uichang District (Korean: 의창구) is a district of Changwon, South Korea.

== See also ==
- Changwon
- Seongsan District
- Masanhoewon District
- Masanhappo District
- Jinhae District
