= Lee Hyo-jae =

South Korean women's rights activist (1924–2020)

- Born: November 4, 1924; Masan, Keishōnan-dō, Korea, Empire of Japan
- Died: October 4, 2020 (aged 95); Changwon, South Korea
- Known for: Social activism, women's rights advocacy

Korean name
- Hangul: 이효재
- Hanja: 李效再
- RR: I Hyojae
- MR: I Hyojae

Lee Hyo-jae (November 4, 1924 – October 4, 2020) was a South Korean social activist who advocated for women's rights. She is noted for pioneering gender studies and campaigning for gender equality in South Korea.

== Biography ==
Lee was born in Masan, Keishōnan-dō (South Gyeongsang Province), Korea, Empire of Japan, later part of independent South Korea. Her father, Lee Yak-shin, was a church minister and her mother, Lee Oak-kyung, was a social worker whose career included running an orphanage, which continues to be operated by her family. Her work on behalf of women's rights led her to be targeted by the government of Park Chung Hee, who was president from 1963 to 1979, serving five consecutive terms after he seized power in 1961, until his assassination.

Lee completed her bachelor's degree in Alabama, and earned a master's degree in sociology from Columbia University. On her return to South Korea following her studies, she helped found the department of sociology at Ewha Womans University in 1958. She also established the first course at the university on women's studies in 1977, which grew to become South Korea's first graduate program in women's studies.

Campaigns advocated by Lee included the reexamination of patriarchal customs in South Korea, including male denomination of heads of households, as well as discrimination against women in property inheritance. She was also noted for her advocacy for quotas for female employment as well as actions towards wage equality for men and women. Her actions led to the abolishment of the country's patriarchal naming system, allowing for people to use both parents' surnames. She also helped establish a rule that required half of the candidates for South Korea's National Assembly to be women.

Her campaigns also led to a demand for Japan to pay monetary compensation to comfort women, who were sexual slaves for Japanese armed forces during the Japanese occupation of Korea.

Lee died on October 4, 2020, from sepsis, in Changwon, South Korea, aged 95.
