= Jinhae District =

Jinhae
- Non-autonomous District
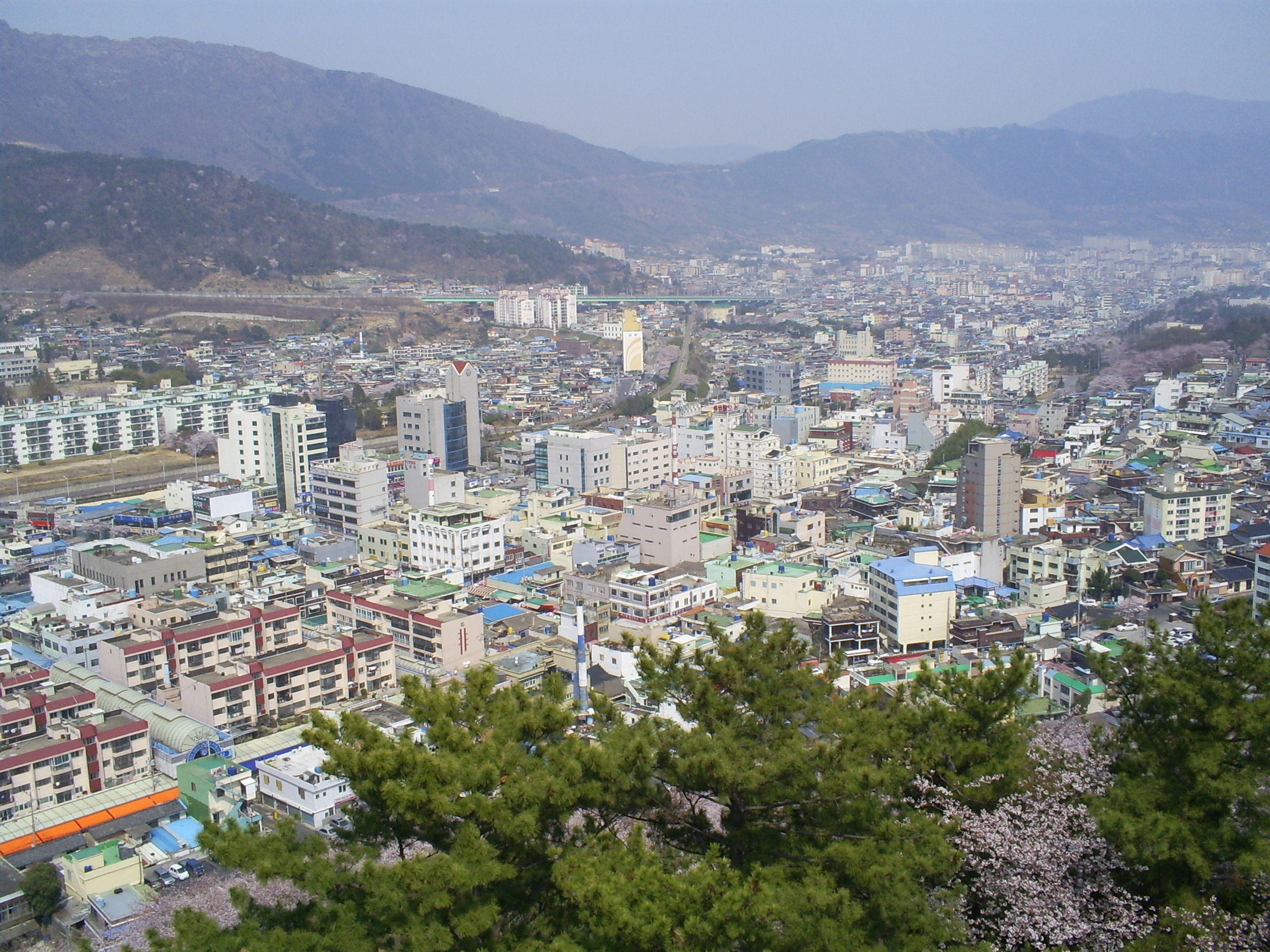
- Cityscape of downtown Jinhae, from Jehehwangsan Park

- Jinhae Emblem

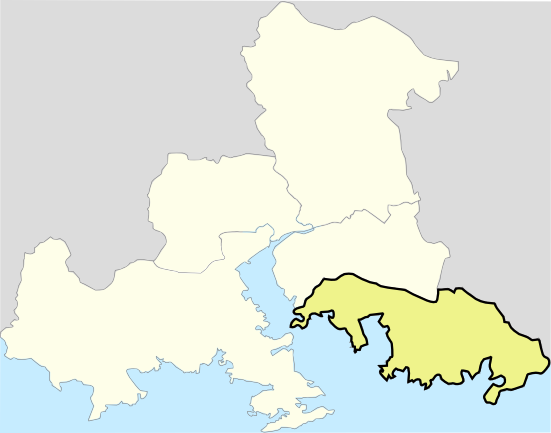
- Location of Jinhae District in Changwon

- Location in South Korea
- Coordinates: 35°09′N 128°40′E
- Country: South Korea
- Region: Yeongnam
- Province: South Gyeongsang
- City: Changwon
- Administrative divisions: 15 dong

Area
  - Total: 120.19 km^{2} (46.41 sq mi)

Population (2010)
  - Total: 172,000
  - Density: 1,431.07/km^{2} (3,706.5/sq mi)
  - Dialect: Gyeongsang

Korean name
- Hangul: 진해구
- Hanja: 鎭海區
- RR: Jinhae-gu
- MR: Chinhae-gu

Jinhae District (Korean: 진해구) is a district of Changwon, South Korea. This region is served by the Korean National Railroad, and is famous for its annual cherry blossom festival every spring.

The city front is on a sheltered, island-studded bay, and is almost completely surrounded by mountains covered with pine trees.

The emblem of Jinhae contains a cherry blossom.

== History ==
Jinhae was developed as a naval base (Chinkai Naval Station) of the Imperial Japanese Navy during the Japanese occupation period in the early 20th century.

On 1 July 2010, Jinhae and its neighboring cities, Changwon and Masan, merged to form the city of Changwon, currently the seat of the Provincial Council of South Gyeongsang Province.

== Economy ==
The city's economy is primarily dependent on the Republic of Korea Navy personnel and their families or employees of the ROKN shipyard and base facilities. Today, Jinhae hosts major naval facilities and commands of the South Korean navy including Commander-in-Chief Republic of Korea Fleet (CINCROKFLT) and the Naval Academy.

Jinhae is part of a large urban corridor that links the adjacent cities of Masan and Changwon. These three cities merged as one in 2010, hence the name "Jinhae District" instead of "Jinhae-si".

Moreover, the city is also host to the one of two US Naval bases in Korea, US Naval Fleet Activities, Chinhae.

== Cherry Blossom Festival (Gunhangje) ==
Each spring the city hosts a ten-day festival, variously promoted as the Military Parade Festival or the Cherry Blossom Festival. Each spring over a million Koreans and other visitors crowd into the town to view the cherry blossoms and to see the street performers, carnival stalls and street lighting as well as the military parades which commemorate the victory of Admiral Yi Sun Shin over a Japanese invasion attempt

In April, the cherry blossoms start to bloom in the south of the Korean peninsula and the cherry blossom festivals begin to be held throughout the country, while displaying a strong regional flavor. (Suh, 2002) "Cherry blossom festivals are presented at some ten locations in Korea including Jinhae, Gyeongju, Gunsan, Yeongam, and Yoido in Seoul, which annually attract millions of visitors. The Jinhae Naval Port Festival, a cherry blossom festival with a tradition of 40 years, includes a ceremony to commemorate the achievements of Admiral Yi Sun-sin. In Yeongam, where the cherry blossom festival is held together with the Wangin Culture Festival, there is a cherry blossom-lined walkway with 250 steps, as well as a parade of 1,000 lanterns. In Hadong, Gyeongsangnam-do province, a cherry blossom festival is staged in the area between the Hwagae marketplace and Ssangyesa Temple. Since the region has long been known for its traditional market, the cherry blossom festival events include an unveiling of a statue of a vendor, selection of a "cherry blossom ssireum champion" and "cherry blossom singer", and a naturally formed cherry blossom archway, which is known as "pathway leading to a wedding". (Yong, 2016) The Jinhae Gunhangje Cherry Blossom Festival where every year, an estimated 340,000 cherry trees burst into an ocean of pale pink blossoms. It is by far the largest and the most beautiful cherry blossom festival in South Korea. Along the Yeojwacheon Stream at night are also what you must do during the festival. Decorated with beautiful lanterns and colorful umbrellas, you will be swept away by a dazzling array of colorful splendor. These cherry blossom trees attract an estimated 1 million tourists to Jinhae every year. The festival is officially known as Gunhangjae (군항제), or Naval Port Festival. Two of the best places to view the cherry blossoms are Yeojwacheon stream (여좌천) and Gyeonghwa train station (경화역 벚꽃길). Gyeonghwa station. (Kim, 2000) In addition to Yeojwacheon Starlight Festival, Sokcheonhang Port Multimedia Fireworks Show. Another festival is the Cornelian Cherry Festival at Sangwi village. It is a smaller festival but it is worth taking the time to appreciate the brilliant Cornelian cherry flowers decorating the fields in the morning. Farmers driving their oxen to the fields in the early morning fog is a picturesque scene from Sangwi village that can be witnessed only during the early morning hours. The Sangwi village is usually crowded as a marketplace with its Cornelian cherry flowers still in full bloom, due to the many tourists who come to drink the sap from acer mono. If you avoid this hectic period, you will be able to return home with your heart filled with the vigor of spring. The Yeouido and Seokchon Cherry Blossom Festivals in Seoul. These festivals attract a large amount of the Seoul population, plus many tourists. The island of Jeju has a cherry blossom festival, but in recent years has been cancelled due to Covid. The final big festival takes place in Gyeongju. The Gyeongju chery blossom festival is one of the most distinctive on the Korean peninsula. It takes place in and around the old Silla kingdoms capital city. The cities roads are flanked by old growth cherry trees, as are the parks, burial mounds, and the temples located throughout the city and mountains. Many of the trees are protected due to their being located on UNESCO World Heritage site grounds.

== Sister cities ==
- Annapolis, Maryland, United States
- Kure, Hiroshima Prefecture, Japan
- Viña del Mar, Valparaíso, Chile
- Nagato City, Yamaguchi Prefecture, Japan

== Notable people from Jinhae District ==
- Park Jin-young, actor and member of K-pop boygroup Got7 and duo JJ Project.
- Jin Seon-kyu, actor

== See also ==
- Changwon
- Uichang District
- Seongsan District
- Masanhoewon District
- Masanhappo District
