= Kyongnam Shinmun =

South Korean daily regional newspaper

- Founded: March 1946; 79 years ago
- Headquarters: Changwon, South Korea

Korean name
- Hangul: 경남신문
- Hanja: 慶南新聞
- RR: Gyeongnam sinmun
- MR: Kyŏngnam sinmun

The Kyongnam Shinmun (Korean: 경남신문) is one of two daily newspapers covering the South Korean province of Gyeongsangnam-do. Its headquarters are in Changwon. Like most of the country's newspapers, it publishes entirely in Korean and does not publish on Sunday. Its competitor is the Gyeongnam Ilbo.

The company was founded in March 1946 in Masan. It sent its first correspondent to Seoul 10 years later. In 2002, it appointed its current CEO, Kim Jo-il.

== See also ==
- List of newspapers
- Communications in South Korea
