= Antarcticimicrobium luteum =

Scientific classification
- Domain: Bacteria
- Kingdom: Pseudomonadati
- Phylum: Pseudomonadota
- Class: Alphaproteobacteria
- Order: Rhodobacterales
- Family: Rhodobacteraceae
- Genus: Antarcticimicrobium
- Species: A. luteum

Binomial name
- Antarcticimicrobium luteum (Kim et al. 2019) Zhang et al. 2020

Type strain
- 318-1

Synonyms
- Ruegeria lutea

Species of bacterium

Antarcticimicrobium luteum is a Gram-negative, short-rod-shaped, mesophilic, aerobic and non-motile bacterium from the genus of Antarcticimicrobium which has been isolated from marine sediments from the Masan Bay in South Korea.
