= Gyeongnam (disambiguation) =

Gyeongnam may refer to:

- Gyeongsangnam-do, a province in the southeast of South Korea
- Gyeongnam FC, a South Korean soccer club based in the Gyeongsangnam-do province
- Gyeongnam Ilbo, is one of the two daily newspapers serving in Gyeongsangnam-do province
