= Masanhoewon District =

- Non-autonomous District
- Interactive map of Masanhoewon District
- Country: South Korea
- Region: Yeongnam

Area
  - Total: 90.58 km^{2} (34.97 sq mi)

Population (2010)
  - Total: 225,556
  - Density: 2,460.28/km^{2} (6,372.1/sq mi)
  - Dialect: South Gyeongsang Province

Korean name
- Hangul: 마산회원구
- Hanja: 馬山會原區
- RR: Masanhoewon-gu
- MR: Masanhoewŏn-gu

Masanhoewon District (Korean: 마산회원구) is a district of Changwon, South Korea.

== See also ==
- Changwon
- Masan
- Uichang District
- Seongsan District
- Masanhappo District
- Jinhae District
