= List of districts in South Korea =

Districts of South Korea
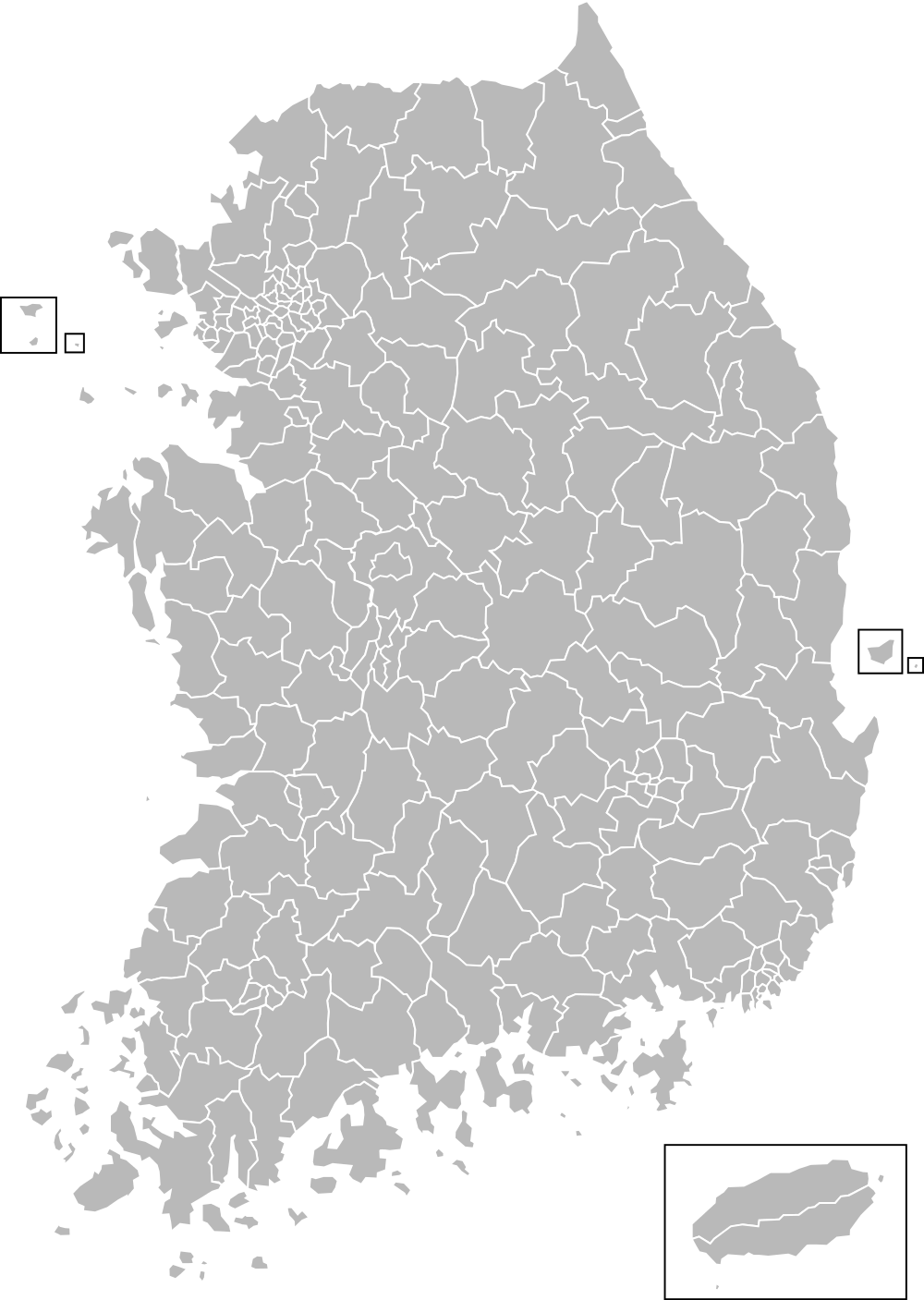
- Map as of 2013

- District
- Hangul: 구
- Hanja: 區
- RR: gu
- MR: ku

Autonomous district
- Hangul: 자치구
- Hanja: 自治區
- RR: jachigu
- MR: chach'igu

Non-autonomous district
- Hangul: 일반구
- Hanja: 一般區
- RR: ilbangu
- MR: ilban'gu

A gu (Korean: 구; IPA: [ku]), or district, is an administrative unit in South Korea. There are two kinds of districts in South Korea. One is the autonomous district (자치구) of special and metropolitan cities, which is a municipal entity similar to a city with its own mayor along with its own legislative council. The other is the non-autonomous district (일반구) of municipal cities. Cities with over 500,000 people are allowed to have gu (notable exceptions to this rule are the cities of Gimhae, Hwaseong, and Namyangju).

== List of districts in South Korea ==
District	Korean	Hanja	City	Population (2012)	Area (km^{2})	Density (people/km^{2})	Founded (YYYY-MM-DD)	Type
Danwon District	단원구	檀園區	Ansan	335,849	91.23	3,681	2002-11-01	Non-autonomous
Sangnok District	상록구	常綠區	Ansan	380,574	57.83	6,580	2002-11-01	Non-autonomous
Dongan District	동안구	東安區	Anyang	353,381	21.92	16,122	1992-10-01	Non-autonomous
Manan District	만안구	萬安區	Anyang	265,462	36.54	7,265	1992-10-01	Non-autonomous
Buk District	북구	北區	Busan	309,602	39.44	7,850	1978-02-15	Autonomous
Busanjin District	부산진구	釜山鎭區	Busan	394,931	29.69	13,302	1957-01-01	Autonomous
Dong District	동구	東區	Busan	101,251	9.78	10,353	1957-01-01	Autonomous
Dongnae District	동래구	東萊區	Busan	282,732	16.63	17,000	1957-01-01	Autonomous
Gangseo District	강서구	江西區	Busan	62,963	180.24	349	1988-01-01	Autonomous
Geumjeong District	금정구	金井區	Busan	255,979	65.17	3,928	1988-01-01	Autonomous
Haeundae District	해운대구	海雲臺區	Busan	425,872	51.46	8,276	1980-01-01	Autonomous
Jung District	중구	中區	Busan	49,011	2.82	17,380	1957-01-01	Autonomous
Nam District	남구	南區	Busan	296,955	26.77	11,093	1975-10-01	Autonomous
Saha District	사하구	沙下區	Busan	357,060	40.96	8,717	1983-12-15	Autonomous
Sasang District	사상구	沙上區	Busan	256,347	36.06	7,109	1995-03-01	Autonomous
Seo District	서구	西區	Busan	124,896	13.88	8,998	1957-01-01	Autonomous
Suyeong District	수영구	水營區	Busan	177,575	10.20	17,409	1995-03-01	Autonomous
Yeongdo District	영도구	影島區	Busan	144,852	14.13	10,251	1957-01-01	Autonomous
Yeonje District	연제구	蓮堤區	Busan	214,056	12.08	17,720	1995-03-01	Autonomous
Jinhae District	진해구	鎭海區	Changwon	179,015	120.14	1,490	2010-07-01	Non-autonomous
Masanhappo District	마산합포구	馬山合浦區	Changwon	186,757	240.23	777	2010-07-01	Non-autonomous
Masanhoewon District	마산회원구	馬山會原區	Changwon	223,956	90.58	2,472	2010-07-01	Non-autonomous
Seongsan District	성산구	城山區	Changwon	250,103	82.09	3,047	2010-07-01	Non-autonomous
Uichang District	의창구	義昌區	Changwon	250,702	211.22	1,187	2010-07-01	Non-autonomous
Heungdeok District	흥덕구	興德區	Cheongju	256,681	198.27	1,294	1995-01-01	Non-autonomous
Sangdang District	상당구	上黨區	Cheongju	179,867	404.44	445	1995-01-01	Non-autonomous
Cheongwon District	청원구	淸原區	Cheongju	162,422	214.99	755	2014-07-01	Non-autonomous
Seowon District	서원구	西原區	Cheongju	228,659	114.88	1,990	2014-07-01	Non-autonomous
Dongnam District	동남구	東南區	Cheonan	250,906	438.52	572	2008-06-23	Non-autonomous
Seobuk District	서북구	西北區	Cheonan	315,577	197.70	1,596	2008-06-23	Non-autonomous
Jung District	중구	中區	Daegu	77,095	7.06	10,920	1963-01-01	Autonomous
Dong District	동구	東區	Daegu	341,616	182.22	1,875	1963-01-01	Autonomous
Seo District	서구	西區	Daegu	223,681	17.48	12,797	1963-01-01	Autonomous
Nam District	남구	南區	Daegu	169,765	17.44	9,735	1963-01-01	Autonomous
Buk District	북구	北區	Daegu	450,852	94.09	4,792	1963-01-01	Autonomous
Suseong District	수성구	壽城區	Daegu	461,473	76.46	6,035	1980-04-01	Autonomous
Dalseo District	달서구	達西區	Daegu	606,178	62.34	9,724	1988-01-01	Autonomous
Daedeok District	대덕구	大德區	Daejeon	207,312	68.45	3,029	1989-01-01	Autonomous
Dong District	동구	東區	Daejeon	248,344	136.61	1,818	1977-09-01	Autonomous
Jung District	중구	中區	Daejeon	77,095	7.06	10,920	1977-09-01	Autonomous
Seo District	서구	西區	Daejeon	223,681	17.48	12,797	1988-01-01	Autonomous
Yuseong District	유성구	儒城區	Daejeon	288,618	177.27	1,628	1989-01-01	Autonomous
Deogyang District	덕양구	德陽區	Goyang	393,479	165.51	2,377	1996-03-01	Non-autonomous
Ilsandong District	일산동구	一山東區	Goyang	275,159	59.13	4,653	1996-03-01	Non-autonomous
Ilsanseo District	일산서구	一山西區	Goyang	289,745	42.77	6,774	2005-05-16	Non-autonomous
Buk District	북구	北區	Gwangju	469,045	121.74	3,853	1980-04-01	Autonomous
Dong District	동구	東區	Gwangju	101,582	48.86	2,079	1973-07-01	Autonomous
Gwangsan District	광산구	光山區	Gwangju	370,527	222.91	1,662	1988-01-01	Autonomous
Nam District	남구	南區	Gwangju	217,934	61.02	3,572	1995-09-01	Autonomous
Seo District	서구	西區	Gwangju	302,280	46.71	6,471	1973-07-01	Autonomous
Bupyeong District	부평구	富平區	Incheon	562,110	31.99	17,571	1968-01-01	Autonomous
Dong District	동구	東區	Incheon	79,624	7.19	11,075	1968-01-01	Autonomous
Gyeyang District	계양구	桂陽區	Incheon	345,671	45.58	7,584	1995-03-01	Autonomous
Jung District	중구	中區	Incheon	93,520	123.09	760	1968-01-01	Autonomous
Namdong District	남동구	南洞區	Incheon	491,038	56.99	8,616	1988-01-01	Autonomous
Michuhol District	미추홀구	彌鄒忽區	Incheon	419,683	24.85	16,889	1968-01-01	Autonomous
Seo District	서구	西區	Incheon	420,939	113.91	3,696	1988-01-01	Autonomous
Yeonsu District	연수구	延壽區	Incheon	283,840	42.74	6,640	1995-03-01	Autonomous
Deokjin District	덕진구	德津區	Jeonju	283,813	110.79	2,562	1989-05-01	Non-autonomous
Wansan District	완산구	完山區	Jeonju	361,038	95.22	3,792	1989-05-01	Non-autonomous
Buk District	북구	北區	Pohang	262,581	393.33	668	1995-01-01	Non-autonomous
Nam District	남구	南區	Pohang	253,278	735.48	344	1995-01-01	Non-autonomous
Bundang District	분당구	盆唐區	Seongnam	485,767	69.35	7,005	1991-09-17	Non-autonomous
Jungwon District	중원구	中原區	Seongnam	256,298	26.38	9,715	1989-05-01	Non-autonomous
Sujeong District	수정구	壽井區	Seongnam	237,986	45.99	5,175	1989-05-01	Non-autonomous
Dobong District	도봉구	道峰區	Seoul	366,879	20.70	17,724	1973-07-01	Autonomous
Dongdaemun District	동대문구	東大門區	Seoul	366,633	14.20	25,819	1943-06-10	Autonomous
Dongjak District	동작구	銅雀區	Seoul	402,567	16.35	24,622	1980-04-01	Autonomous
Eunpyeong District	은평구	恩平區	Seoul	491,741	29.71	16,551	1979-10-01	Autonomous
Gangbuk District	강북구	江北區	Seoul	345,502	23.61	14,635	1995-03-01	Autonomous
Gangdong District	강동구	江東區	Seoul	496,364	24.58	20,194	1979-10-01	Autonomous
Gangnam District	강남구	江南區	Seoul	570,392	39.54	14,426	1975-10-01	Autonomous
Gangseo District	강서구	江西區	Seoul	571,526	41.42	13,799	1977-09-01	Autonomous
Geumcheon District	금천구	衿川區	Seoul	243,280	13.01	18,699	1995-03-01	Autonomous
Guro District	구로구	九老區	Seoul	422,322	20.12	20,990	1980-04-01	Autonomous
Gwanak District	관악구	冠岳區	Seoul	529,195	29.57	17,897	1973-07-01	Autonomous
Gwangjin District	광진구	廣津區	Seoul	373,608	17.05	21,912	1995-03-01	Autonomous
Jongno District	종로구	鍾路區	Seoul	169,217	23.91	7,077	1943-06-10	Autonomous
Jung District	중구	中區	Seoul	132,224	9.96	13,276	1943-06-10	Autonomous
Jungnang District	중랑구	中浪區	Seoul	425,668	18.51	22,997	1988-01-01	Autonomous
Mapo District	마포구	麻浦區	Seoul	392,635	23.87	16,448	1944-11-01	Autonomous
Nowon District	노원구	蘆原區	Seoul	605,756	35.44	17,092	1988-01-01	Autonomous
Seocho District	서초구	瑞草區	Seoul	432,934	47.00	9,211	1988-01-01	Autonomous
Seodaemun District	서대문구	西大門區	Seoul	318,467	17.60	18,095	1943-06-10	Autonomous
Seongbuk District	성북구	城北區	Seoul	488,036	24.57	19,860	1949-08-13	Autonomous
Seongdong District	성동구	城東區	Seoul	127,748	16.85	7,581	1943-06-10	Autonomous
Songpa District	송파구	松坡區	Seoul	684,028	33.88	20,189	1988-01-01	Autonomous
Yangcheon District	양천구	陽川區	Seoul	498,819	17.40	28,668	1988-01-01	Autonomous
Yeongdeungpo District	영등포구	永登浦區	Seoul	403,062	24.56	16,411	1943-06-10	Autonomous
Yongsan District	용산구	龍山區	Seoul	247,206	21.87	11,303	1943-06-10	Autonomous
Gwonseon District	권선구	勸善區	Suwon	307,410	47.30	6,499	1988-07-01	Non-autonomous
Jangan District	장안구	長安區	Suwon	293,485	33.17	8,848	1988-07-01	Non-autonomous
Paldal District	팔달구	八達區	Suwon	214,653	13.08	16,411	1993-02-01	Non-autonomous
Yeongtong District	영통구	靈通區	Suwon	261,008	27.46	9,505	2003-11-24	Non-autonomous
Buk District	북구	北區	Ulsan	181,611	157.35	1,154	1997-07-15	Autonomous
Dong District	동구	東區	Ulsan	170,639	36.01	4,739	1988-01-01	Autonomous
Jung District	중구	中區	Ulsan	232,421	36.99	6,283	1985-07-15	Autonomous
Nam District	남구	南區	Ulsan	343,487	72.55	4,733	1985-07-15	Autonomous
Cheoin District	처인구	處仁區	Yongin	209,893	467.57	449	2005-10-31	Non-autonomous
Giheung District	기흥구	器興區	Yongin	365,632	81.68	4,476	2005-10-31	Non-autonomous
Suji District	수지구	水枝區	Yongin	314,757	42.10	7,476	2005-10-31	Non-autonomous

=== Renamed districts ===
- Nam District → Michuhol, Incheon (1 July 2018)
- Ilsan District → Ilsandong District, Goyang (16 May 2005)
- Buk District → Bupyeong District, Incheon (1 March 1995)
- Jung District → Wonmi District, Bucheon (1 February 1993)
- Nam District → Sosa District, Bucheon (1 February 1993)

=== Defunct districts ===
- Happo District (합포구; 合浦區), Masan (1 July 1990 – 1 January 2001)
- Hoewon District (회원구; 會原區), Masan (1 July 1990 – 1 January 2001)
- Ulju District (울주구; 蔚州區), Ulsan (1 January 1995 – 15 July 1997)
- Ojeong District (오정구; 梧亭區), Bucheon (1 February 1993 – 4 July 2016)
- Sosa District (소사구; 素砂區), Bucheon (1 January 1988 – 4 July 2016)
- Wonmi District (원미구; 遠美區), Bucheon (1 January 1988 – 4 July 2016)

== See also ==
- Administrative divisions of South Korea
- District (China) the original use of the gu hanja, still in use in China and Taiwan
