= Antarcticimicrobium sediminis =

Scientific classification
- Domain: Bacteria
- Kingdom: Pseudomonadati
- Phylum: Pseudomonadota
- Class: Alphaproteobacteria
- Order: Rhodobacterales
- Family: Rhodobacteraceae
- Genus: Antarcticimicrobium
- Species: A. sediminis

Binomial name
- Antarcticimicrobium sediminis Zhang et al. 2020

Type strain
- S4J41

Species of bacterium

Antarcticimicrobium sediminis is a Gram-negative, aerobic and non-motile bacterium from the genus of Antarcticimicrobium.
