= Antarcticimicrobium =

Scientific classification
- Domain: Bacteria
- Kingdom: Pseudomonadati
- Phylum: Pseudomonadota
- Class: Alphaproteobacteria
- Order: Rhodobacterales
- Family: Rhodobacteraceae
- Genus: Antarcticimicrobium; Zhang et al. 2020

Type species
- Antarcticimicrobium sediminis

Species
- A. luteum; A. sediminis

Genus of bacteria

Antarcticimicrobium is a bacterial genus from the family Rhodobacteraceae.
