= Gyeongnam Ilbo =

South Korean daily regional newspaper

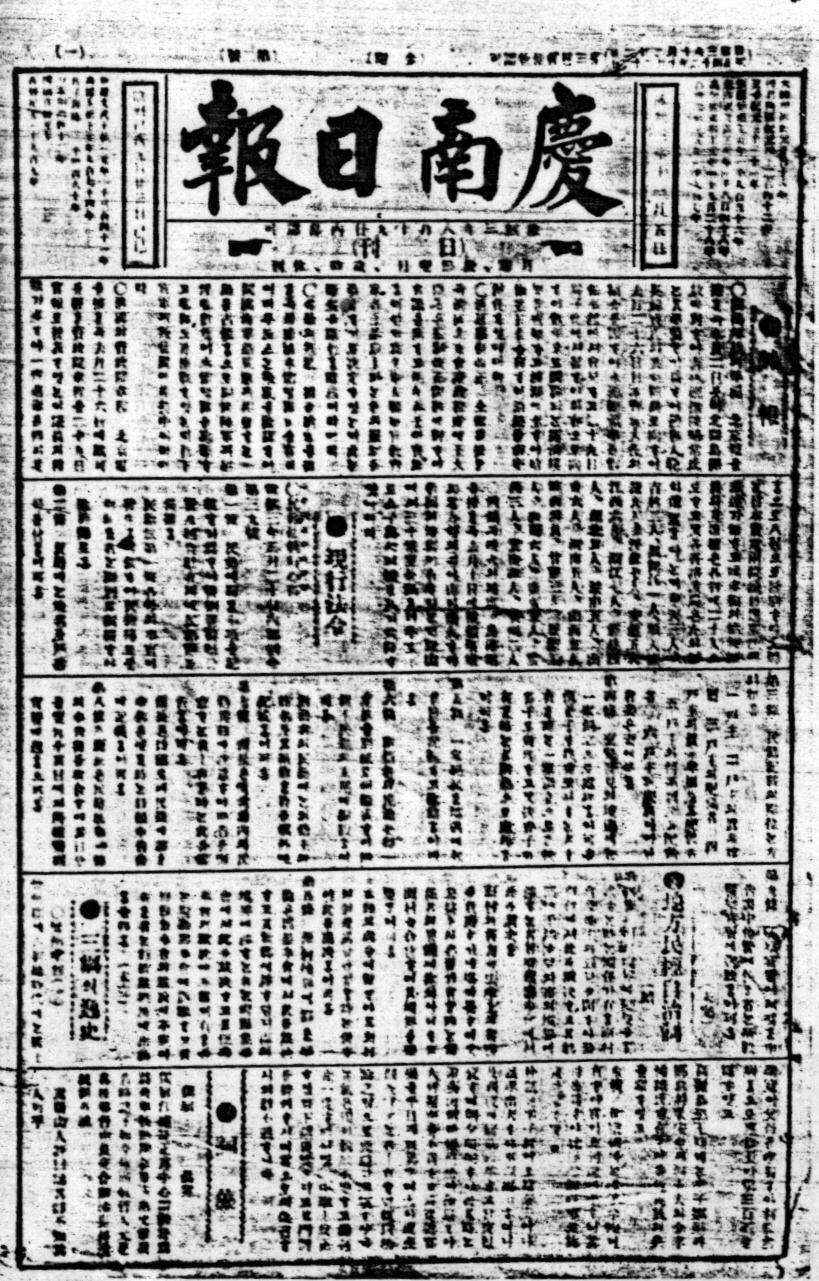
- Cover of the first issue (October 15, 1909)
- Founded: October 15, 1909; 116 years ago
- Ceased publication: January 1915; November 25, 1980
- Relaunched: March 1, 1946; January 1989
- Language: Korean
- City: Jinju
- Country: South Korea
- Website: www.gnnews.co.kr

Korean name
- Hangul: 경남일보
- Hanja: 慶南日報
- RR: Gyeongnam ilbo
- MR: Kyŏngnam ilbo

Gyeongnam Ilbo (Korean: 경남일보) is a daily Korean-language regional newspaper published in Sangpyeong-dong, Jinju, South Korea.

The current newspaper claims to be the successor to two previous newspapers that went by the same name. The original was the first ever regional Korean-language newspaper. It was founded on October 15, 1909, although it closed in January 1915. Another newspaper under that name reopened in 1946, but closed in 1980. The current newspaper opened in 1989. It is one of two regional newspapers for the province, with the other being the Changwon-based Kyongnam Shinmun.

Some of its original predecessor's early issues are available on the Korean Newspaper Archive for free.

== History ==
=== First run ===
The Gyeongnam Ilbo was the first regional Korean-language newspaper and the first newspaper to be published in Jinju. Its company was also the first publicly-owned Korean press company. It was rare at the time, as it was the first newspaper to be founded in a regional Korean city that was not Japanese. By contrast, by 1909 there were around 34 Japanese newspapers across Korea in 1909, and the first newspapers published in cities like Jeonju and Masan were Japanese.

The Gyeongnam Ilbo Company was founded in February 1909, several months before the publication of the first issue. Its office was based out of Jinju-gun (진주군).

It printed its first issue on October 15, 1909. Its first publication was praised by newspapers like The Korea Daily News and even by several in China and Japan. Its first president was Kim Hong-cho (김홍조; 金弘祚). Its first lead writer, Chang Chi-yŏn, was the former president of another Korean newspaper Hwangsŏng sinmun, and former head writer of the Vladivostok-based Korean newspaper Haejo Sinmun. The newspaper initially received financial support from local provincial authorities.

The paper was founded just before the 1910 Japanese annexation of Korea. Shortly after the annexation, the poet Hwang Hyŏn wrote a piece of poetry critical of the annexation entitled Chŏlmyŏngsi (절명시; 絶命詩), and committed suicide in anguish. The Gyeongnam Ilbo published the poem, resulting in its publication being suspended for ten days. Thereafter, because of Japanese censorship, it avoided discussing politics and mostly focused on social issues and educating the Korean people. They founded a night school around November 1910, where Jang taught Classical Chinese.

The paper struggled with its finances. It initially published every day (implied by the term "Ilbo", meaning "daily"), but it struggled to do so. After its 20th issue, it began publishing every other day. Around the time of its start, it had a circulation of around 2,000. However, it struggled to increase its subscriber base and attract advertisers. Jang resigned due to increasing Japanese pressure on the paper on August 30, 1913. Publication of the paper was halted in January 1915, with issue No. 887 being its final issue. The only other daily Korean-language newspaper in Korea around this time was the Maeil Sinbo, which was de facto operated by the colonial government.

=== Second run ===
The newspaper was restarted by a new staff on March 1, 1946, after the end of the colonial period. It was notably right-leaning and anti-communist. Heo Man-che (허만채) took the lead in restarting the paper. He was reportedly so passionate about it that he sold his food company to fund the paper's development.

The paper was heavily involved in the November 22, 1949 establishment of the annual Gaecheon Art Festival, then known as the Yeongnam Art Festival. The festival still runs today. The newspaper funded the event until the 11th installment, and much of the work done for preparing the festival was performed by the newspaper's staff.

During the 1950–1953 Korean War, the newspaper struggled to keep running. Its headquarters and printing equipment was destroyed. The paper, which once staunchly supported first President of South Korea Syngman Rhee, began to criticize him as Rhee tightened control over the country. As a result, on July 26, 1952, armed assailants raided one of their offices and destroyed their equipment and materials. The newspaper was closed for seven weeks.

In 1961, after Park Chung Hee seized power in the May 16 coup, the military government demanded that Seol Chang-su (설창수), the president of the newspaper since 1952, resign. The paper began publishing more on local stories and culture around this time. On November 25, 1980, the newspaper was made to close after a government order was issued for there to be one newspaper per province. The Gyeongnam Ilbo was merged into the Kyongnam Shinmun.

=== Third run ===
The newspaper was restarted by a new staff in January 1989. It constructed a new office in Sangpyeong-dong. It initially used the name "Shin Gyeongnam Ilbo" (신경남일보; lit. New Gyeongnam Ilbo), because of legal restrictions on using the original name. It eventually acquired the rights to use the name, and began printing under it on January 1, 2000 with its No. 13691 issue. In 2003, a copy of the first-ever issue of the paper was found in an old house in Sugok-myeon, and was designated South Gyeongsang Province Tangible Cultural Heritage No. 482 on August 6, 2009.

== See also ==
- List of newspapers in Korea – pre-1945 newspapers
- List of newspapers in South Korea
- History of newspapers in Korea
