= Moon Shin =

South Korean painter and sculptor (1922 - 1995)

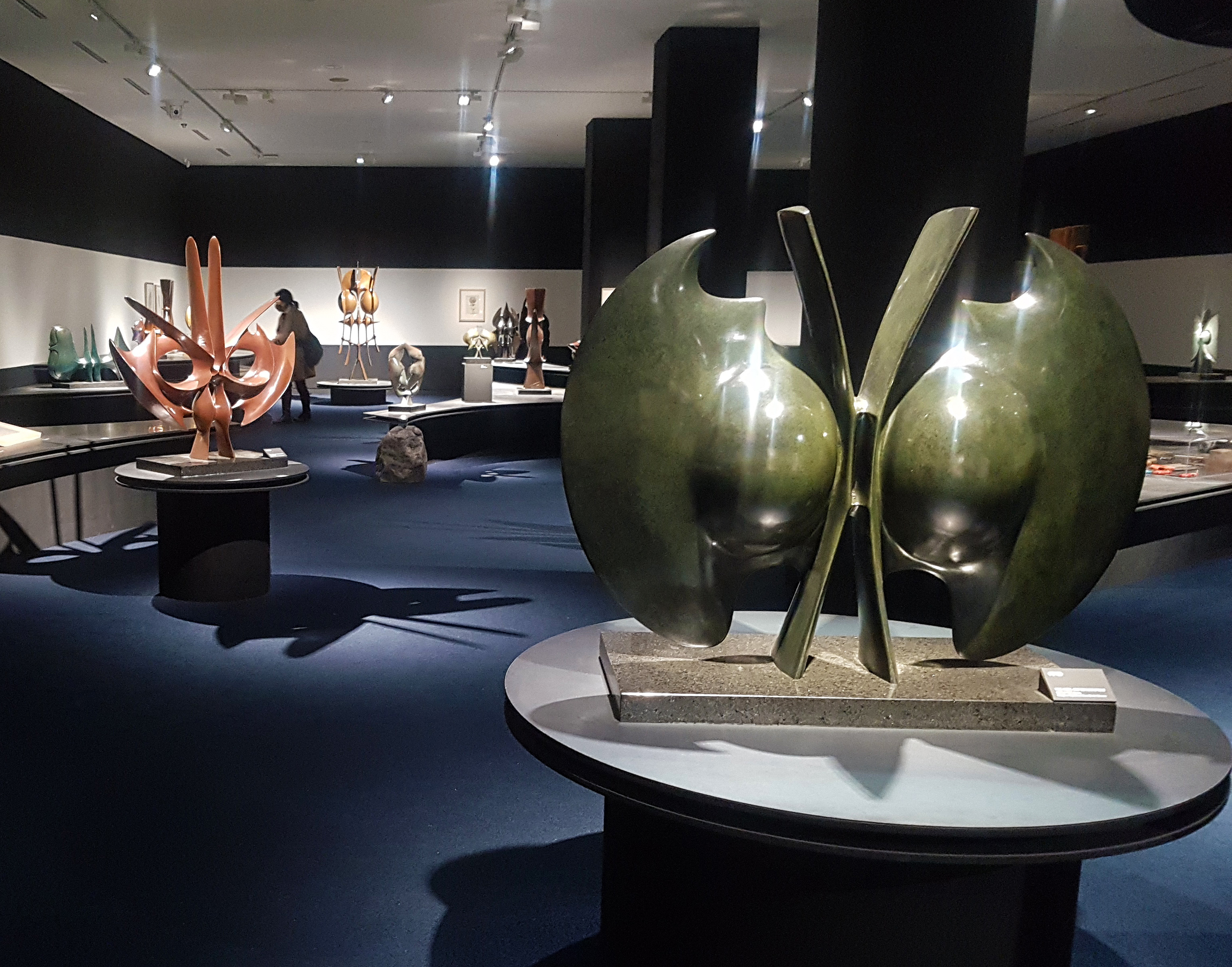
- Moon Shin - Towards the Universe Exhibition - Seoul 2022

Korean name
- Hangul: 문신
- Hanja: 文信
- RR: Mun Sin
- MR: Mun Sin

Birth name
- Hangul: 문안신
- Hanja: 文安信
- RR: Mun Ansin
- MR: Mun Ansin

Moon Shin (Korean: 문신; Hanja: 文信, January 16, 1922 – May 24, 1995) was a South Korean painter and then, sculptor whose childhood name was Moon Ahn-shin. His date of birth was reported late and is erroneously stated as 1923 in most publications. When an international exhibition was held in France in 1989 to commemorate the 200th anniversary of the French Revolution, Moon was one of 24 artists who were invited. One of his pieces can be found in SOMA sculptor park celebrating the 1988 Summer Olympics Seoul.

== Biography ==
Born in Takeo, Japan, his family moved to his father's hometown, Masan in current Gyeongsangnam-do. Since his mother's family never accepted the existence of his father, he had to set apart from her at 5. In need, he worked as a laborer in Tokyo, studying Occidental painting in Nihon art college since he was 16.

After independence of Korea, he refused to participate in Korean national art exhibition given that the foundation was conservative in his viewpoint. Later, he joined the "Modern art association" of major artists notably such as Yoo Youngguk, Park go seok and Han muk in 1957 before he decided to leave for Paris.

He died of gastric cancer in 1995.

== Work ==
He moved to Paris in 1961 at first. His study in Paris encouraged him to immerse in modern art, which made him get into abstract paintings or sculptures focusing on wood materials. This period is meaningful in that the artist widened his work space in arts.

After a two-year stay in Seoul, he returned to Paris. This time he paid attention to large-scale sculptors in abstract and imaginary structures, which called for invitation of several exhibition across Europe. The outdoor exhibition in Le Barcarès brought him international fame starting in Europe.

After coming back to Paris, his pieces achieved unique style in forms of symmetry, such as shapes of plants or creatures to fascinatingly demonstrate vitality. His pieces represent the beauty of Korean tradition through bilateral symmetry with images of life.

Although early pieces during Moon's second term in France didn't have definite titles such as 〈Piece〉·〈Sculptor〉·〈Untitled〉, exact titles started to be presented at later phase. This period provided him with a series of opportunities to introduce pieces in Italy, Switzerland, Germany and so on.

Returning to South Korea in 1980, he settled in Masan, his hometown, eagerly focusing on sculptors made of bronze, stainless metal. The difference from his anterior period was ingredients: He started to use much thicker materials such as ebony and pine trees.

His philosophy comes from the idea that all the creatures hold the concept of symmetry and harmony in nature. Strong materials such as iron and metal drove him to accomplish his original objective. His pieces show through patterns of Korean arts from the early 1950s and 1960s to mature abstract paintings until the early 1990s.

== Honors ==
He constructed an art center by himself in Masan to commemorate his art pieces, coming after honorable degree of literature from Kyungnam University.

The French government honoured Moon by celebrating his artwork to enhance interchange relationship between Korean and French modern art. Notably, his works were invited to several exhibitions: invitation exhibition of Paris art center in 1990; Hungarian Natural History Museum in 1991; retrospective exhibition in Musée d'Art Moderne de la Ville de Paris (1992).

== See also ==
- Yi Eungro
- Kim Heungsou
- Park Naehyeon
- Whanki Kim
