= Masan Bay =

Bay in Changwon, South Korea

Masan Bay (Korean: 마산만) is a bay in Changwon, South Korea.
