= Masan =

Former municipal city in South Korea

Coordinates: 35°11′N 128°33′E

Panoramic view of former Masan

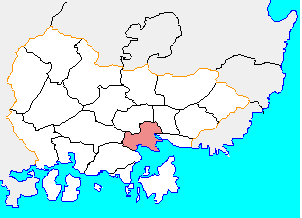
Masan City prior to the merger on 1 July 2010

Masan (Korean: 마산) is an administrative region of Changwon, a city of South Gyeongsang Province, South Korea. It was formerly an independent city from 1949 until 30 June 2010, when it was absorbed to Changwon along with Jinhae. Masan was redistricted as two districts within Changwon, Masanhappo District and Masanhoewon District. On 31 December 2012, the population of the districts combined was 406,893.

Throughout Korean history, Masan served as a significant port city of Happo, which went through rapid modernization in the 19th century. It was also a stage for significant democratization movements in the 1960s and 1970s, most notable event being the Bu-Ma Democratic Protests in 1979. Due to its status as a free trade port, Masan has experienced consistent growth until the early 1990s when the construction of Changwon went underway and began to attract citizens around the region.

== History ==
September 1274 – After Korean officials encouraged Kublai Khan – head of the Mongol Yuan Dynasty – in 1267 that Japan would be easily subdued, the Koryo Korean state built over 300 large ships to aid an invasion of Japan. With over 20,000 Mongol troops as well as 5,000 Korean, the allied armies departed Masan on board 900 ships on 15 September 1274 in a failed campaign to conquer Japan.

May 1899 – The port of Masan was opened with pressure from Japan. Among the initial trading goods were salt, fish, cotton and other goods.

15 March 1960 – A protest against electoral corruption was spearheaded by the Democratic Party in Masan. Approximately 1000 residents attended the demonstration, which took place at 19:30 in front of the Democratic Party Headquarters in Masan. The protest sparked violent clashes between demonstrators and police officers in which seven students were killed and some fifty others injured. To restore order, authorities blacked out Masan and General Carter B. Magruder eventually dispatched US Marines to quell the unrest.

11 April 1960 – The body of Kim Ju-yul was discovered in Masan Harbor. Kim – still dressed in his uniform from Masan Commercial High School – had disappeared in the March 15 clashes. Authorities claimed that he had drowned, but many Masan residents did not believe this explanation and forced their way into the hospital where Kim's body was stored. At the hospital, they discovered that grenade fragments behind his eyes had actually killed him. In the following days, mass demonstrations broke out involving as many as 40,000 residents throughout the characteristically politically left-leaning city. During renewed clashes with police, police opened fire and killed several protesters. Once again, the US military was called in to help restore order. At this point, public anger with the government had grown to new highs and rebellion against the Rhee government mushroomed around the country. Authorities 8 declared martial law.

Thus, the events in Masan in 1960 helped spark the movement against corruption known as the April 19 Movement, which eventually led to the resignation of President Syngman Rhee and the beginning of the Second Republic.

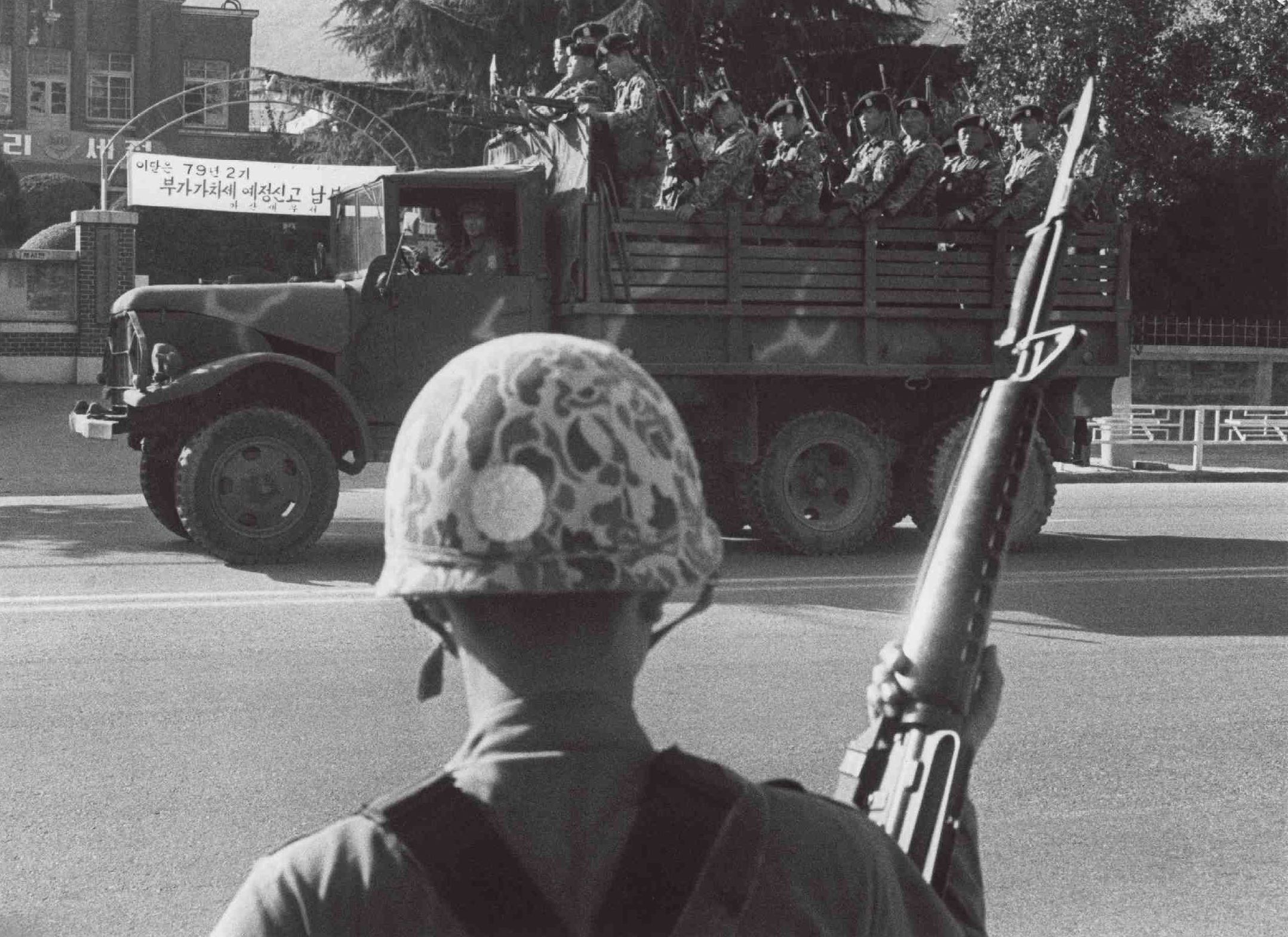
Paratroopers entering Masan, starting a brutal crackdown on the city, following democracy protests and the declaration of martial law

October 16–20, 1979 – Protests broke out in Masan (as well as in Busan) against the regime of President Park Chung Hee following a brutal police crackdown on a sit-in strike of female textile workers from YH Trading Company. Workers in Masan's Free-export Zone even managed to create four labour unions.

== Administrative divisions ==
Like most Korean cities, the city center of Masan is divided into administrative dong. Outlying regions are divided into 1 eup and 4 myeon:

1. Naeseo-eup (내서읍)
2. Sanho-dong (산호동)
3. Gusan-myeon (구산면)
4. Jindong-myeon (진동면)
5. Jinbuk-myeon (진북면)
6. Jinjeon-myeon (진전면)
7. Hyeon-dong (현동)
8. Gapo-dong (가포동)
9. Woryeong-dong (월영동)
10. Munhwa-dong (문화동)
11. Banwol-dong (반월동)
12. Jungang-dong (중앙동)
13. Wanwol-dong (완월동)
14. Jasan-dong (자산동)
15. Dongseo-dong (동서동)
16. Seongho-dong (성호동)
17. Gyobang-dong (교방동)
18. Nosan-dong (노산동)
19. Odong-dong (오동동)
20. Happo-dong (합포동)
21. Hoewon-dong (회원동) (divided into two administrative dong)
22. Seokjeon-dong (석전동) (divided into two administrative dong)
23. Hoeseong-dong (회성동)
24. Yangdeok-dong (양덕동) (divided into two administrative dong)
25. Hapseong-dong (합성동) (divided into two administrative dong)
26. Guam-dong (구암동) (divided into two administrative dong)
27. Bongam-dong (봉암동)

== Education ==
Masan has three institutions of higher education: public vocational focused, which is located on the northwestern outskirts of the city in Yongdam-ri, and the private Kyungnam University (경남대학교), which is located in the southern part of Masan adjacent to Shin Masan. And the small private Christian Chang Shin College, in the northeastern part of the city.

== Entertainment and sports ==
The original central business district of Masan is located in Chang-dong. But recently it has moved to Hapseong-dong. Hapseong-dong is also a commercial neighborhood. An area with many bars, restaurants, and other forms of entertainment is located in Sinmasan.

Masan's baseball stadium is the home of the KBO League's NC Dinos. It previously occasionally hosted the Lotte Giants, a Korea Baseball Organization team which plays in nearby Busan. A professional women's baseball team, one of several in South Korea, plays in Sinpo-dong. An amusement park and zoo are on the tiny island of Dot-do

Masan is also very close to Geojedo, a large island that can be reached by bus, car, or ferry.

== Food ==
Masan is generally known for its fishing industry and is the origin of spicy Agujjim, a steamed dish made with agwi (아귀, blackmouth angler). Until the 1940s, the fish was not eaten and was frequently discarded due to its ugly appearance and low commercial value. However, as fish began to become more scarce in the late 20th century, the newly found delicacy became popular. Since its creation, agujjim has been considered a local specialty of Masan, especially around Odong-dong, one of the neighborhoods there and is favored by the public nationwide.

== Transportation ==
Machang Bridge is the first large-scale bridge to be built in South Korea as a public-private partnership. The sponsors of the project, Bouygues Travaux Publics and Hyundai Engineering & Construction, had been pursuing the Project since the late 1991s. MCB Co., Ltd, the Concessionaire, is jointly owned by the sponsors and MKIF.

== Masan Port ==
The port was once operated by the Mongolians (Yuan Dynasty in China) and used in the preparations to conquer Japan - which eventually failed. To this day, Masan features the small but historic "Mongojeong" (몽고정,蒙古井) meaning Mongol Well. It is located on Jasan-dong 117, and represents the Mongolian influence on the city.

Today, Masan Port is one of the city's most dominating features. It was first opened in 1901. The port connects much of the outside world with the Changwon Industrial Complex, Masan's Free Trade Zone and the future Sachun Industrial Complex.

== Tourist spots ==
- Jeodoyeonneukgyo Bridge(Jeodo Island Land Connecting Bridge)

Jeodoyeonneukgyo Bridge is a popular spot to watch the sunrise and sunset. Built in 1990, the bridge connecting Gubok-ri and Jeodo Island is 182m in length and 15.5m in height. Rocks found on both ends of the bridge extend outward toward the sea, and one can cross the bridge while enjoying the backdrop of the deep blue sea.

- Jasan Solbat Park

This park is located in the heart of Masan, with a waterwheel along a 95m-long small stream, a pine trail created with red clay, an outdoor fitness area with gym equipment, a playground for children in the forest, an outdoor performance stage, and a gateball court.

- Gagopa Kkoburang-gil

This is a mural village where people can take a walk along a winding alley, and enjoy a view of a mountain village and the Masan Port. 32 artists painted the murals without pay as part of the efforts to invigorate the communities in Chusan-dong and Seongho-dong.

- Dotseom Island

Dotseom Island in Masan is an island spot away from the city. One can get there on a ferry ride from Masan Port. It's an island with walking paths along the coast, green nature, and views of the bay and mountains.

== Sister cities ==
- Jacksonville, Florida, United States
- Houston, Texas, United States
- Mokpo, South Korea
- Shulan, China
- Zapopan, Jalisco, Mexico
- Himeji, Japan
- Ussuriisk, Russia

== Notable residents ==
- Lee Hyo-jae (1924–2020), social activist
- Ryu Hyun-kyung (1983), actress, film director, music video director
- Choi Soon-hwa (born 1943), model

== See also ==
- Changwon – City in South Gyeongsang, South Korea
- Masan-Happho-gu
- Masan-Hoiwon-gu
