= Changwon =

City in South Gyeongsang, South Korea

- Specific city
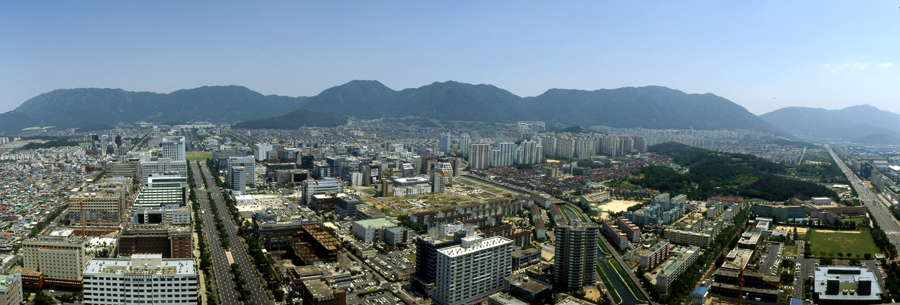
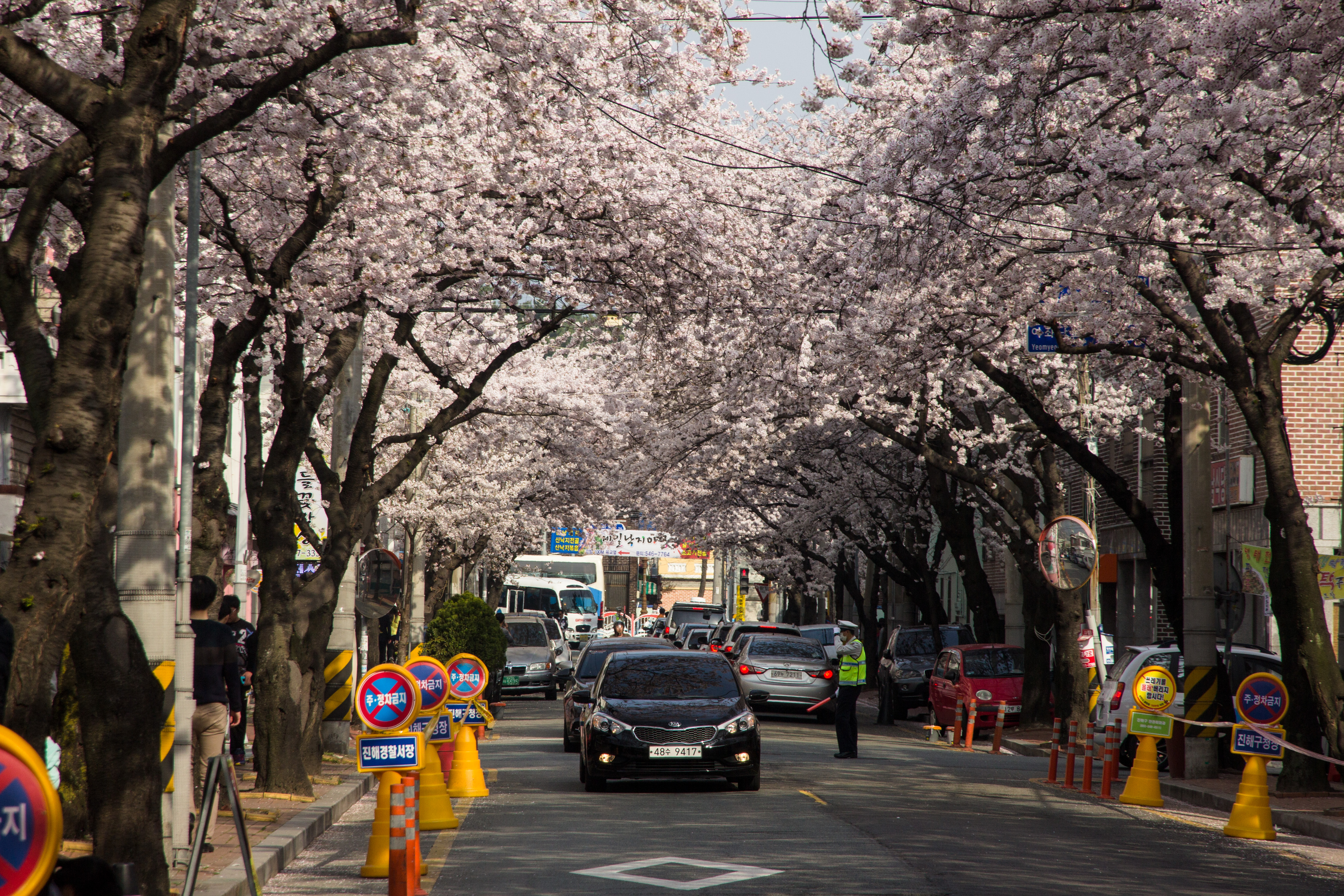
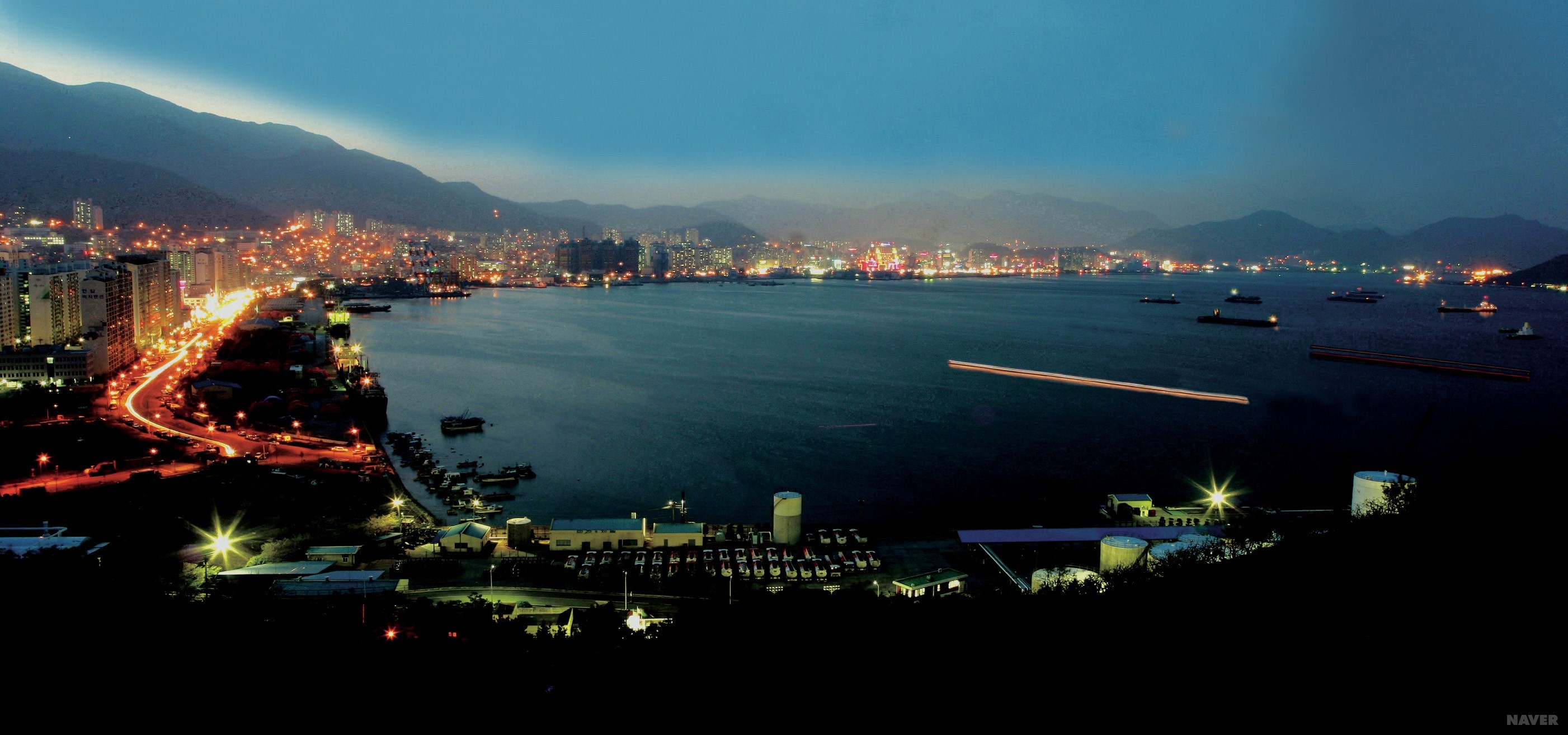
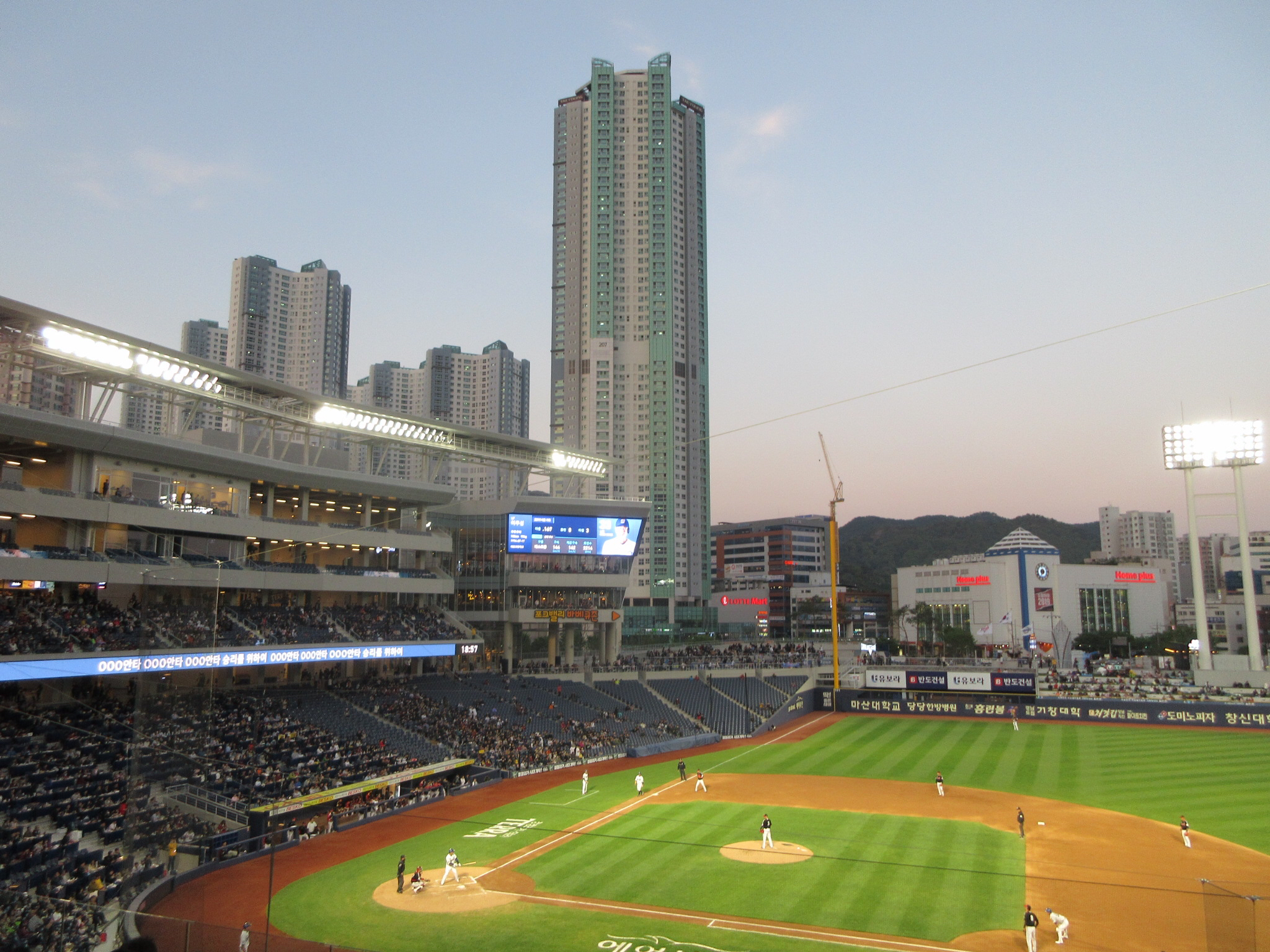
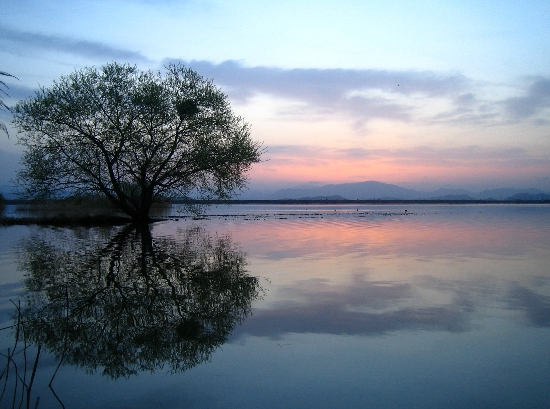
- Downtown Changwon Jinhae District Masan Harbour Changwon NC Park Junamjeosuji Reservoir

- Flag
- Interactive map of Changwon
- Location within South Korea Location within Asia Location within Earth
- Coordinates: 35°16′15″N 128°39′47″E
- Country: South Korea
- Region: Yeongnam
- Established: 1408
- Administrative divisions: 5 Gu, 2 eup, 6 myeon

Government
  - Mayor: Kang Ki-youn (People Power)
  - Council chairman: Lee Chi-Woo

Area
  - Total: 747.12 km^{2} (288.46 sq mi)
- Elevation: 2 m (6.6 ft)

Population (February 2026)
  - Total: 1,008,315
  - Density: 1,432/km^{2} (3,710/sq mi)
  - Dialect: Gyeongsang
- Demonym: Changwonian
- Time zone: UTC+09:00
- Website: Changwon Office

Korean name
- Hangul: 창원시
- Hanja: 昌原市
- RR: Changwon-si
- MR: Ch'angwŏn-si

Changwon (Korean: 창원; Korean pronunciation: [tɕʰaŋ.wʌn]) is the capital and largest city of South Gyeongsang Province, South Korea (with a population of 1,025,702 as of 2023), and the 11th largest city of the country. A port city, Changwon is bordered by Masan Bay to the south, and the cities of Busan and Gimhae to the east. The city of Miryang lies to the northeast, and Jinju to the west.

The region has been inhabited since the Bronze Age, and its urban areas have been renamed and re-organized many times throughout history. In 1974, with the creation of the Changwon National Industrial Complex, the three historically interdependent cities of Masan, Jinhae District, and Changwon began to undergo significant economic development, growing into an important industrial centre. On 1 July 2010, the cities of Changwon, Jinhae, and Masan merged to form the current city of Changwon.

As Korea's first planned city, modeled after Canberra, Australia, Changwon uses accessible urban planning including many parks and separate residential and industrial areas. The city has also branded itself an "environmental capital" with the municipal government actively participating in climate change conferences and committing to the development of sustainable policies like the globally recognized bike-sharing program, Nubija.

== History ==
=== Early history ===
Populated since the early Bronze Age, the area surrounding Masan Bay would have been a wide open region between the ocean and the hilly lands of the coastal plain. Today ruins can be found in the area dating from the Iron Age. Typical Iron Age landmarks include Bangyedong monuments, dolmens, holy mounds, lower molar sites, and dolmens from Bronze Age settlements.

In 209 AD, during the Three Kingdoms period, the area was named Gulja-gun, a province of the Silla kingdom. During the Unified Silla Period, this region was renamed to Uian-gun in 739 AD, during the reorganization of all Silla provinces, then in the Goryeo Period, to Uichang-hyeon.

The name Changwon was first used in 1408 during the Joseon period, when King Taejong established the city as Changwon-bu. In 1415, he renamed Changwon-bu to Changwon-dohobu. Later during the King Sunjo Period (1601), it became Changwondae-do hobu.

In 1895, the country was reorganized into 23 divisions by King Gojong, and Changwondae-do hobu was split into Changwon-gun and Ungcheon-gun. In 1908 Ungcheon-gun merged with nearby Jinhae-gun. During the Japanese colonial period, the city became known as Masan-bu, and Masan Port was opened. Eventually, Changwon was separated from Masan-bu.

=== Post-Korean War ===
In 1970, the Masan Free Export Zone was opened to encourage foreign business to move to the area. In 1974, Changwon was selected to be an industrial and residential centre, as well as the provincial capital. The Changwon Industrial Complex was built in the south of the city, while Changwon began urban planning modelling itself after Canberra, Australia.

The country's longest straight road was constructed in Changwon, with a length of 15.27 kilometres (9.49 mi), with the industrial park to the south and residential complexes constructed to the north. This road, Changwon Daero, is meant to serve as an airplane runway in a state of emergency as Changwon was designed to be South Korea's emergency backup capital city. Underground walkways are able to serve as bomb shelters and roads and buildings in the planned city are numbered for efficient use in evacuation.

In 1985, the Korean War Monument (충혼탑) in Changwon's Uichang gu was constructed. The 47.1 metres (155 ft) monument is "dedicated to the 1,142 soldiers from Gyeongsangnam province that died in the Korean War."

On 1 July 2010, the three neighboring cities of Masan, Changwon and Jinhae unified to create Unified Changwon City, with a population of 1.04 million.

== Geography ==
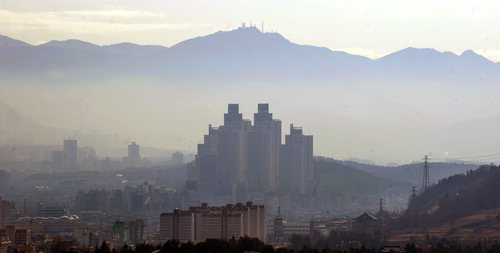
Downtown Changwon

Changwon is located on the southeastern coast of the Korean Peninsula, on the Nakdong River delta looking out onto Masan Bay. The city is surrounded by mountains, the highest of which are Mt. Bulmo (802 m (2,631 ft)), Mt. Jeongbyeong (567 m (1,860 ft)), and Mt. Jangbok (582 m (1,909 ft)). As a representative planned city in South Korea, Changwon is primarily situated in a basin surrounded by these mountains, featuring a well-organized grid-like urban layout designed for industrial and administrative efficiency.

The city also comprises several small islands in Masan Bay and along the coast including Dot island, Sokuri island, and several uninhabited islands.

The city has four distinct seasons. The climate of Changwon is a humid subtropical climate (Köppen: Cwa) with very warm summers and cold winters. The average temperature ranged between 2.8 °C (37.0 °F) in January to 26.5 °C (79.7 °F) in August. The average annual precipitation is 1,527 mm (60.1 in). Between 1980 and 1990 there was an annual average of around 116 sunny days a year (32% of the year), and between 1990 and 2000 an average of 135 (37%).

Climate data for Changwon (1991–2020 normals, extremes 1985–present)
Month	Jan	Feb	Mar	Apr	May	Jun	Jul	Aug	Sep	Oct	Nov	Dec	Year
Record high °C (°F)	18.0 (64.4)	21.6 (70.9)	23.9 (75.0)	30.0 (86.0)	33.6 (92.5)	34.7 (94.5)	39.0 (102.2)	38.5 (101.3)	35.4 (95.7)	30.5 (86.9)	24.8 (76.6)	20.9 (69.6)	39.0 (102.2)
Mean daily maximum °C (°F)	7.1 (44.8)	9.4 (48.9)	13.8 (56.8)	19.1 (66.4)	23.7 (74.7)	26.1 (79.0)	29.0 (84.2)	30.4 (86.7)	26.9 (80.4)	22.2 (72.0)	15.6 (60.1)	9.2 (48.6)	19.4 (66.9)
Daily mean °C (°F)	2.6 (36.7)	4.6 (40.3)	8.7 (47.7)	13.8 (56.8)	18.5 (65.3)	21.8 (71.2)	25.3 (77.5)	26.5 (79.7)	22.6 (72.7)	17.3 (63.1)	10.9 (51.6)	4.6 (40.3)	14.8 (58.6)
Mean daily minimum °C (°F)	−1.2 (29.8)	0.3 (32.5)	4.4 (39.9)	9.4 (48.9)	14.2 (57.6)	18.5 (65.3)	22.6 (72.7)	23.6 (74.5)	19.3 (66.7)	13.3 (55.9)	6.8 (44.2)	0.6 (33.1)	11.0 (51.8)
Record low °C (°F)	−14.0 (6.8)	−11.3 (11.7)	−5.8 (21.6)	0.0 (32.0)	6.8 (44.2)	10.9 (51.6)	15.9 (60.6)	17.9 (64.2)	10.9 (51.6)	2.7 (36.9)	−3.2 (26.2)	−10.3 (13.5)	−14.0 (6.8)
Average precipitation mm (inches)	29.6 (1.17)	48.0 (1.89)	78.5 (3.09)	133.8 (5.27)	146.4 (5.76)	190.7 (7.51)	304.5 (11.99)	238.8 (9.40)	172.9 (6.81)	72.3 (2.85)	47.9 (1.89)	27.7 (1.09)	1,534.1 (60.40)
Average precipitation days (≥ 0.1 mm)	4.5	4.7	7.5	8.7	9.2	10.1	14.2	12.5	9.2	4.7	5.5	4.5	95.3
Average snowy days	2.0	1.5	0.6	0.0	0.0	0.0	0.0	0.0	0.0	0.0	0.1	1.4	5.6
Average relative humidity (%)	47.6	49.1	54.8	59.3	65.7	74.6	81.0	77.1	71.4	62.5	57.2	50.3	62.6
Mean monthly sunshine hours	189.2	188.9	205.2	212.3	223.1	170.5	145.0	174.2	163.7	207.9	183.3	186.9	2,250.2
Percentage possible sunshine	57.5	59.6	51.4	53.3	47.3	36.9	30.9	38.2	42.4	58.6	57.9	57.9	48.2
Source: Korea Meteorological Administration (percent sunshine 1981–2010)

== Cityscape ==
=== Administrative divisions ===
Changwon has 5 administrative districts (Gu) which are divided into 54 neighborhoods (dong), 5 in Uichang District, 7 in Seongsan District, 12 in Masanhoewon District, 15 in Masanhappo District and 13 in Jinhae District.

Map				
Gu of Changwon				Masan Harbour Central Changwon
District	Hangul	Hanja	Area (km^{2})	Masan Harbour Central Changwon
Uichang District	의창구	義昌區	211.17	Masan Harbour Central Changwon
Seongsan District	성산구	城山區	82.20	Masan Harbour Central Changwon
Masanhappo District	마산합포구	馬山合浦區	240.65	Masan Harbour Central Changwon
Masanhoewon District	마산회원구	馬山會原區	90.58	Masan Harbour Central Changwon
Jinhae District	진해구	鎭海區	122.52	Masan Harbour Central Changwon

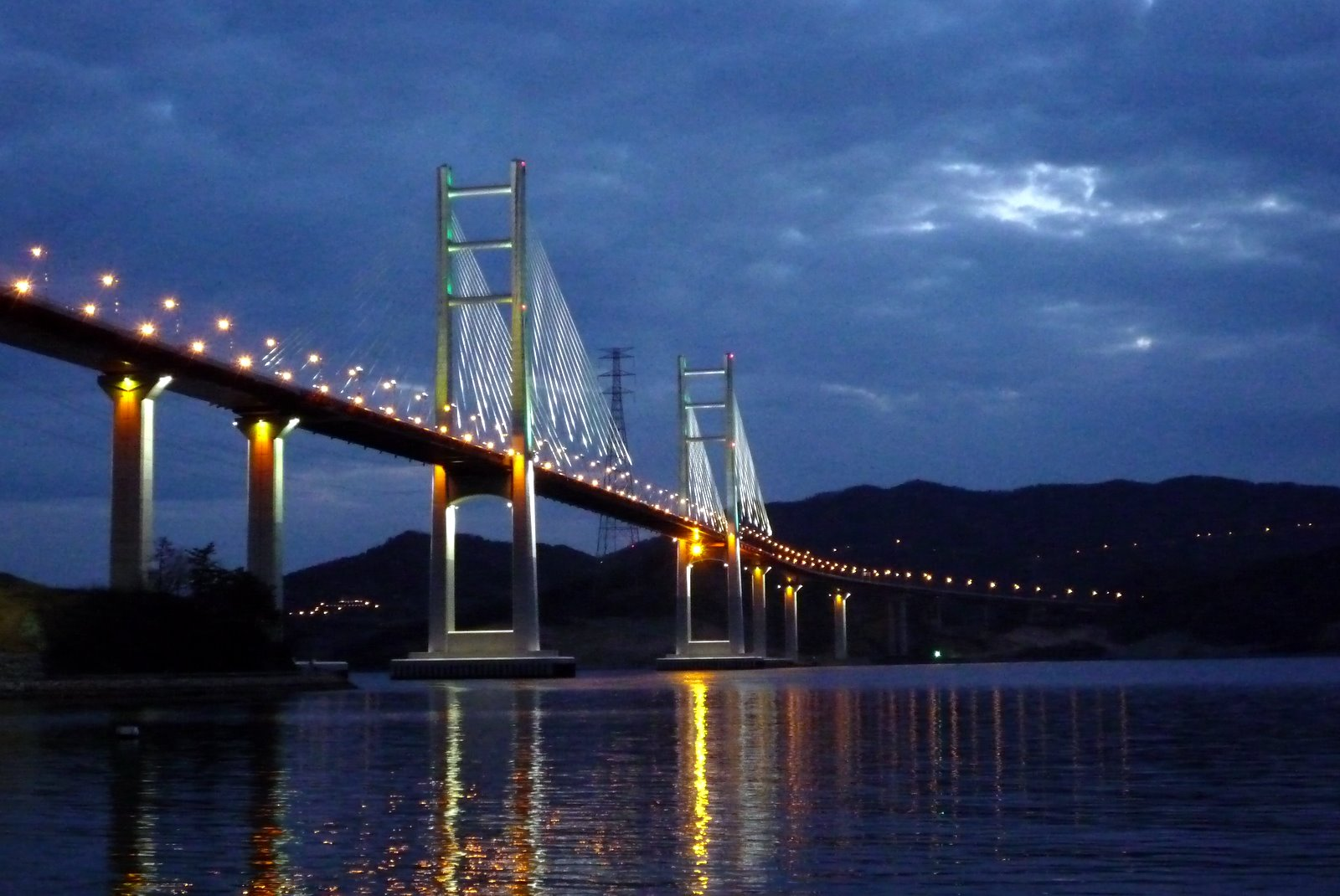
Masan-Changwon Bridge

Sangnam-dong/Jungan-dong

=== Neighborhoods ===
The development of Changwon into an industrial city during the 1960s and 1970s has led to a city structure that is bisected by one main avenue called Changwon Daero, meaning Changwon big road. To the south are the factories, to the north are all of the residential areas. Changwon Daero also serves as emergency runway for military purposes.

The Financial district is located in the southern part of Jungang-dong and Sangnam-dong, while the government district located northern part of Youngho-dong and Shinwol-dong.

The Changdong Art Village has many murals and artwork on display throughout the streets. Originally Masan's old town, when businesses began to disperse, "ateliers, cafés, and galleries took over the vacant stores" transforming the area into a thriving art district.

The Sangnam neighborhood is the central part of greater Changwon. The main part of this neighborhood, the Sangnam Commercial District (상남상업지구), is the main nightlife area, with many bars, hotels, business bars, noraebangs, and restaurants. On every day of the month with a date that ends in 4 or 9 the market "Sangnam-sijang" is open and bustling for business. This is the largest farmer's market within the city, with vendors selling fresh seafood, vegetables, and other groceries as well as clothing and pottery. There is also a large-scale residential complex of high-rise apartments.

Jungan-dong, located just west of Sangnam, is the "old town" and extended central area of the city. There is more nightlife here than restaurants, and local English speaking expats often frequent the area for drinks and laughs, often living very nearby. This is the most likely place to meet one of the foreign English teachers, engineers and armed services residence of the area.

== Economy ==
Changwon owes its rapid growth since the 1970s primarily to the Changwon industrial Complex, a 25.302 km^{2} (9.769 sq mi) hub of factories dominated by heavy industry which employs 82,000 and leads the chemical, industrial, and heavy machinery sectors of the Korean economy. In September 2010, the Changwon Industrial Complex exceeded 2,000 tenant companies. The tenants are 97.8% (1,957) small-to-medium—sized businesses, while large corporations make up 2.2% (44) including Samsung Techwin, GM Korea, LG Electronics, Hyundai Rotem, Doosan Heavy Industries & Construction, Doosan Infracore, Hyosung, Hyundai Wia and STX Corporation.

The defence industry of Changwon makes up a large part of its industrial output and the majority of South Korea's weapons manufacturing. 70% of South Korea's defense industry is based in Changwon. The city was chosen to host the military defense industry because of the city's natural basin shape and coastal access. Major defense companies like Hanwha Defense and Hyundai Rotem manufacturing the K9 Thunder and K2 Black Panther respectively are based out of Changwon.

As the provincial capital, Changwon is home to several government offices, and the Jinhae District contains a large naval base housing various units of the Republic of Korea Navy and United States Navy.

Changwon's Gross Regional Domestic Product is 21.7 trillion won which is higher than that of Gwangju and Daejeon. It earned 29 billion dollars through exports in 2008, more than Busan, Gwangju, Daejeon or Daegu.

== Education and health ==
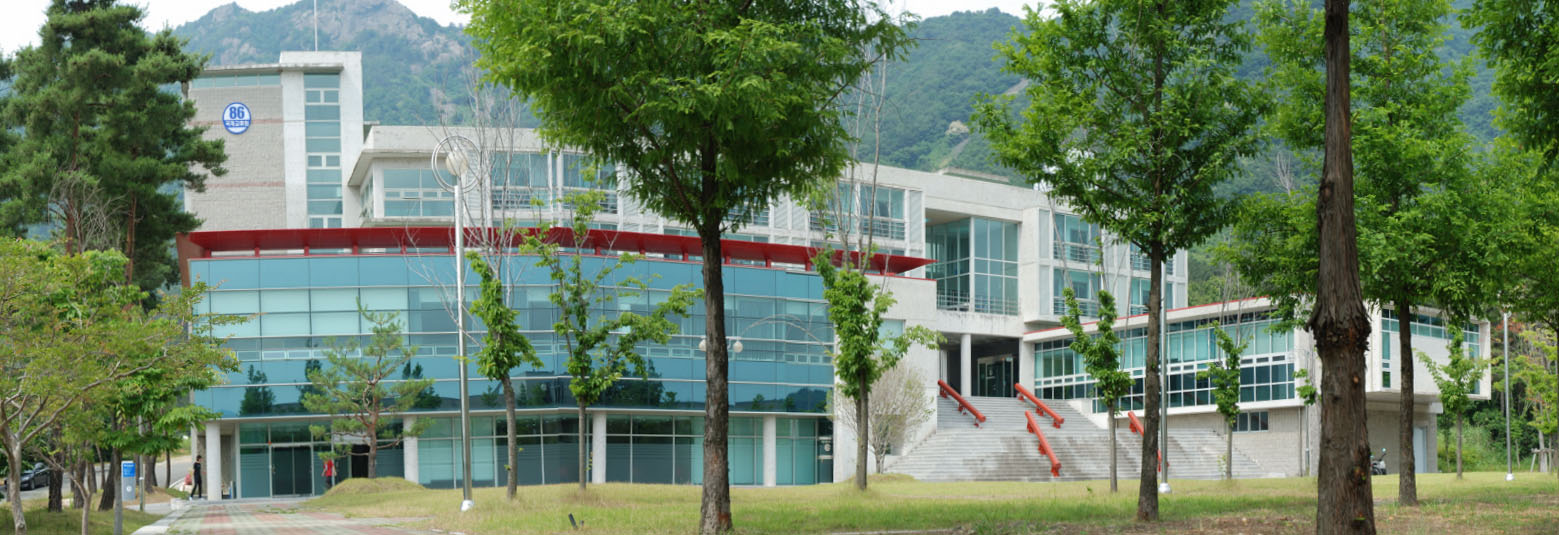
Changwon National University

=== Schools ===
Students in Changwon can attend one of the six main post-secondary institutions:

- Changwon National University
- Kyungnam University
- Masan University
- Korea Naval Academy
- Chang Shin College
- Changwon Polytechnic College

There are 46 high schools, 63 middle schools, 105 elementary schools and 193 kindergartens in Changwon, including two special-purpose high schools: Changwon Science High School and Changwon Mechanical Technical High School.

=== Healthcare ===
Although a growing divide between Changwon's vibrant, modern west side and its older east side, has been identified as a source of socioeconomic and health inequality among its citizens, Changwon's municipal government has responded with renewed commitment to ensuring the social determinants of health for all citizens. Changwon's Healthy City Initiative has undertaken several initiatives to promote better health including the implementation of a bike-sharing system, "the development of walking trails in apartment complex areas" accessible to 85% of its citizens, building a new publicly funded health centre in the east side, and the installation of defibrillators in public areas like shopping centres and apartment complexes, giving Changwon "tremendous potential as an international model" for cities wishing to encourage public health.

The Samsung Changwon's Hospital's Regional Emergency Medical Centre, the region's has been ranked as Gyeongsangnam-do's top emergency medical centre.

== Culture and contemporary life ==
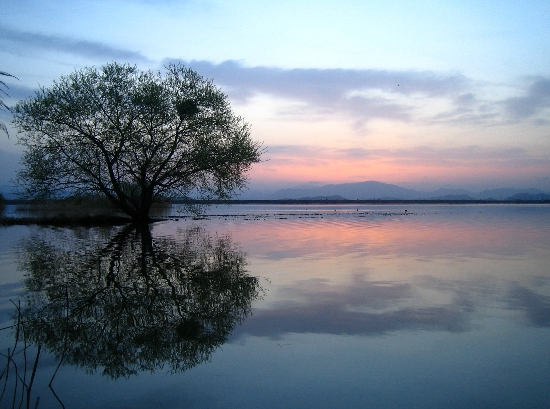
Junamjeosuji Reservoir

As a planned city, Changwon was built to include more natural space than many other cities in Korea including dozens of parks, gardens, trails, and plazas throughout the city. The city is also located on the coast, making it home to several beaches.

Some well known Changwon parks include Jinhae Dream Park, an ecological reserve; Junamjeosuji, a reservoir and bird sanctuary; House of Changwon, a hanok village and education centre; and Changwon Marine Park on Dotseom Island.

Changwon is also home to the Changwon Exhibition Convention Centre (CECO).

As the capital and largest city in Gyeongsannam-do, Changwon is a provincial centre for media production and home to television and radio broadcaster Changwon KBS that hosts the K-Pop World Festival each year and newspaper the Kyongnam Shinmun.

=== Festivals ===
Changwon is home to numerous festivals throughout the year, including:

- K-Pop World Festival: a yearly singing and dancing competition in which contestants from all over the world perform live cover versions of K-Pop songs.
- Jinhae Gunhangje Festival: a yearly 10-day event beginning on 1 April, which features cherry blossom viewing, fireworks, concerts, a parade and performances by international Military Bands & Honor Guard .
- Changwon Sculpture Biennale: honoring the late Moon Shin
- Changwon Food Culture Festival and National Indigenous Food Cooking Contest: the third Saturday of each October
- Warty Sea Squirt Festival: a seafood festival held in April to celebrate the local mindeodeok and featuring a fireworks show.
- Changwon National Folk Bullfighting Festival: a tournament held each October where entrants are determined by draw
- Changwon Namsan Sangbongje Festival: a gathering held the weekend after Chuseok when locals gather on a mountain to perform an ancient harvest ceremony and drink, sing, & dance with their neighbours "as a way to seek the Chuseok traditions of our ancestors".
- Jillyesanseong Fortress Royal Azalea Festival: a flower viewing event held at an historical fortress on Bieumsan Mountain during the blooming season of Royal Azaleas.
- Masan Gagopa Chrysanthemum Festival
- Gyeongnam Science Competition(2023.10.27.~2023.10.29.)
- Masan Chrysanthemum Festival(2023.10.28.~2023.11.06.)

=== Sports ===
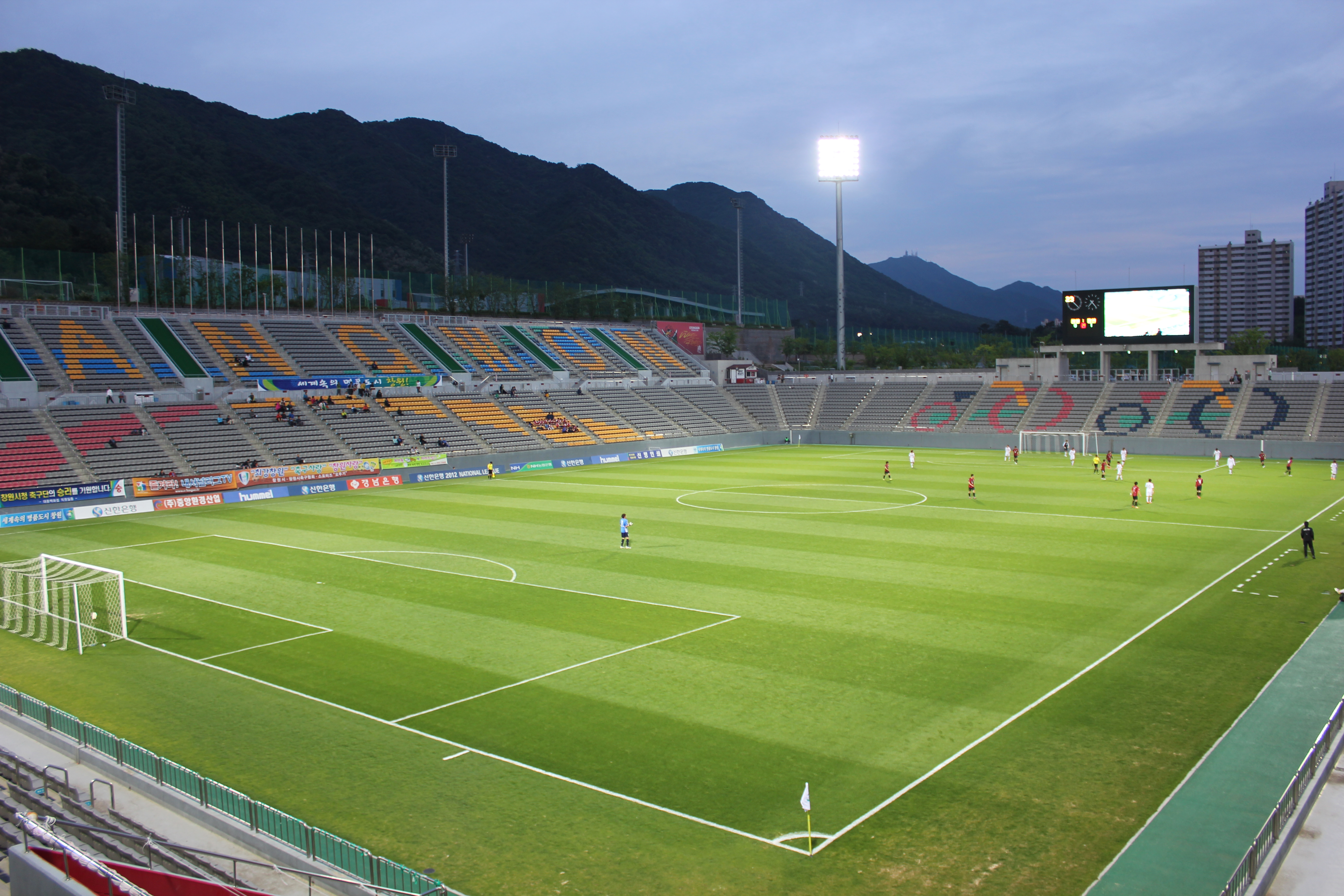
Changwon Football Center

Changwon hosts four professional sports teams: a basketball team, two association football clubs, and a baseball team. The city also hosted a Formula 3 race, the Korea Super Prix, from 1999 to 2003.

Club	Sport	League	Venue	Established
Changwon LG Sakers	Basketball	KBL	Changwon Gymnasium	1997
Changwon FC	Association football	K3 League	Changwon Football Center	2005
Gyeongnam FC	Association football	K League 2	Changwon Football Center	2006
NC Dinos	Baseball	KBO League	Changwon NC Park	2011

=== Foreign culture ===
Per capita, Changwon has one of the largest foreign populations in South Korea, largely due to the Masan Free Trade Zone, which was created to encourage foreign business to move to the area, the Korea Naval Base in Jinhae, which houses numerous American military professionals, and the prevalence of English academies known as hagwons throughout Korea which frequently employ teachers from a variety of English-speaking countries.

Changwonderful, a website created by two foreign residents of Changwon, was created in 2012 as a resource for those traveling and moving to the city from abroad, with a goal to "not only ease foreigner life in Changwon, but also strengthen ties between foreigners and the local community." The website encourages reader participation in content creation and provides information on local business, attractions, culture, and infrastructure.

The Changwoner, a podcast with over 50 episodes as of 2017 and hosted by three foreign residents of Changwon, represents another project by foreign residents of Changwon to promote the city and build a common culture between residents, visitors, and ex-pats living in Changwon. The Changwoner also has a social media presence on YouTube, Facebook, and Twitter.

== Transportation ==
=== Bike sharing ===
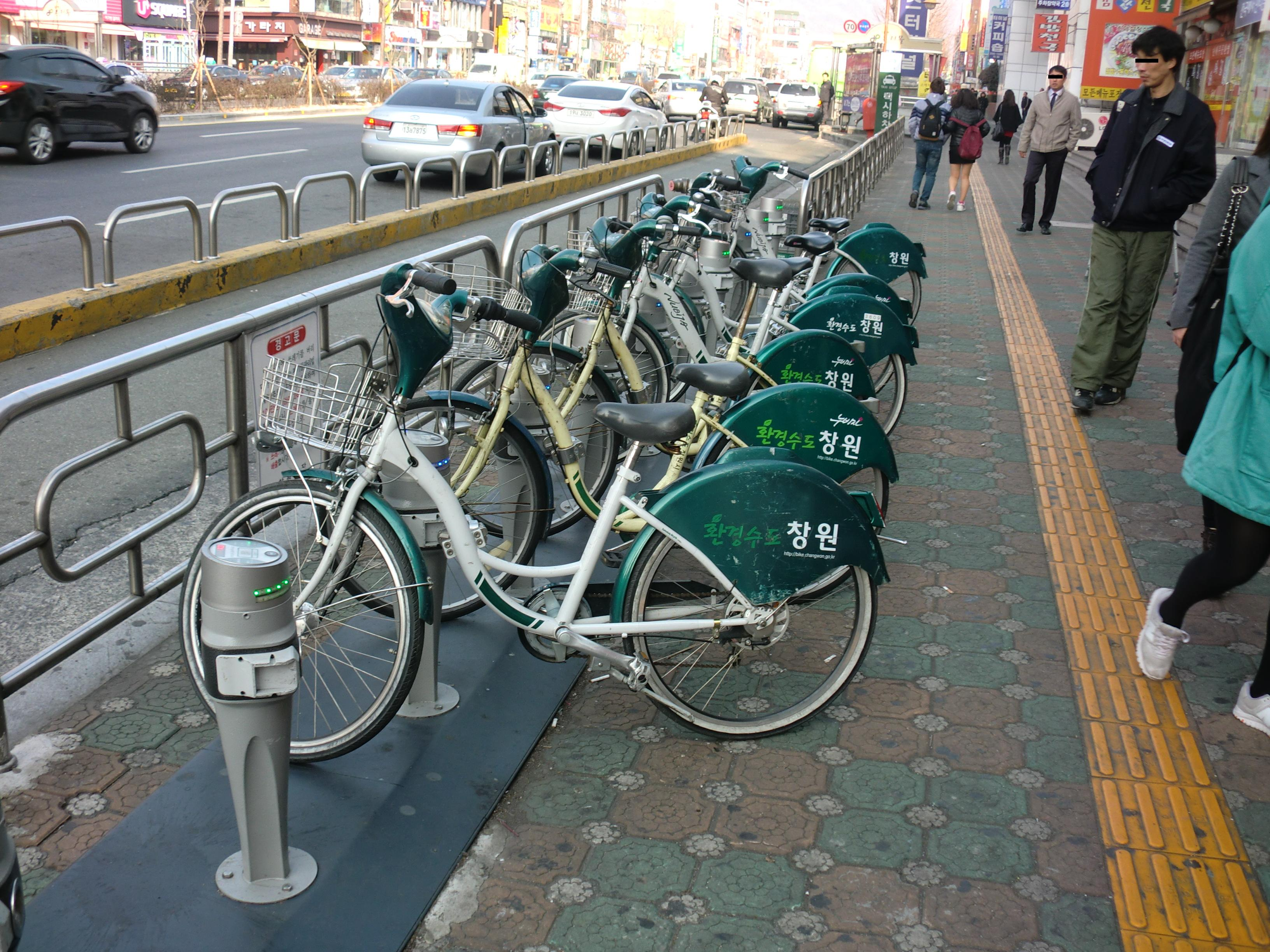
A Nubija bike-share terminal

Changwon, having been the first city in Korea to declare itself a cycling city, is now considered "one of the world's leading cities in terms of its public bicycle system". The Nubija bike sharing system was introduced in 2008 in an attempt to alleviate traffic and parking issues, encourage public health, and move away from car-dependent models of urban planning. The bike-share program also included infrastructural changes to the city, including 18 new bike lanes spanning 100.8 kilometres (62.6 miles), giving Changwon Korea's largest public bicycle rental system.

As of 2012, Nubija had 4,704 bicycles available at 241 terminals throughout the Changwon area, which can be searched for using the Nubija app. Users access the bicycles using a small chip called a MyBi pass.

Nubija had over 68,823 registered users in 2012, and rented an average of 15,850 bicycles per day.

The name Nubija comes from the Korean words nubida, which means "to travel" and jajeongeo, which means "bicycle."

=== Buses ===
As a planned city, Changwon "utilizes a grid style infrastructure which makes transportation more efficient than other cities of comparable size". Changwon and the surrounding area are served by over 80 city bus and express bus routes. Express and Inter-city buses connect Changwon to other cities throughout Korea from six bus terminals throughout the city. See Changwon Buses.

=== Rail ===
The city is on the Gyeongjeon Line (Gwangju-Samnangjin), which stretches along the southern coast and links the Jeolla and Gyeongsang regions feeding local traffic into adjacent major lines. As of 2010, KTX trains began running from Changwon to Seoul; travel time is approximately three hours.

There are four Gyeongjeon line stations in the Changwon area:

- Masan Station
- Changwon Station
- Changwon Central (JungAng) Station
- Jinhae Station.

=== Ferries ===
Masan Ferry Terminal offers service to the city of Geoje to the southeast.

At Masan Dotseom Marine Park, a 10-minute ferry is available to Dotseom, a forested island in the centre of Masan Bay.

=== Airport ===
Gimhae International Airport (PUS) is the closest airport, 35 kilometres (22 miles) east of Changwon in the city of Gimhae.

In 2016, the airport was the 4th busiest in South Korea, with 14,900,815 passengers passing through.

== Tourist Attraction ==
- Jinhae Dream Road (Course 2) – The Jinhae Dream Road in Changwon, South Gyeongsang used to be a forest trail, but then it turned into the Anmin Road, which is now used for hiking. It is made up of four sections, one of them being the Cheonjabong Haeoreum-gil (Course 2) which is a 10-kilometer (6.2-mile) trail that connects the Anmin rest area to the meeting plaza of Wigallim-gil. The road is surrounded by various kinds of trees, ranging from peach and bamboo to cherry trees. Starting from Mount Ung all the way to Cheonjabong Peak and Mount Jangbok, the glorious mountain ranges spread out like a folding screen. *Course: Anmin Road (Anmin rest area) – Pyeonbaek rest area – Dream Park Gallim-gil – Cheonjaam – Gallim-gil above the meeting plaza (6.2 miles, 4 hours 10 minutes. Level: Moderate)

== Symbol and slogans ==
The municipal government of Changwon has also designated several official symbols:

Changwon's municipal flag depicts a tri-coloured pinwheel made of C-shaped wings. The white space between the wings forms the image of three people holding hands and spinning in unity, balance, and harmony. The three colours of the pinwheel are: blue, symbolizing the ocean, growth, and hope; orange, which represents the city, passion, and creation; and green for nature, life, and balance.

The official city mascot of Changwon is PIUMI, a childlike figure with a blooming flower on its head, representing the cities famous cherry blossoms.

The city's slogan, 빛나는 땅 창원, means "Bright Changwon."

- City flower: the cherry blossom
- City bird: the black-tailed gull
- City tree: the pine tree

== Twin towns – sister cities ==
Changwon has several international sister cities around the world, as well as designated "Friendship Cities"

International Sister Cities		Friendship Cities	
Municipality	Year	Municipality	Year
Vina del Mar, Chile	1983	Ogaki, Gifu, Japan	1995
Jacksonville, U.S.	1983	Pusun, China	1997
Jersey City, U.S.	1986	Linyi, Shandong, China	2000
Zapopan, Jalisco, Mexico	1987	Yanji, Jilin, China	2002
Annapolis, U.S.	1993	Yakutsk, Russia	2003
Ma'anshan, Anhui, China	1994	Sanya, Hainan, China	2005
Danang, Vietnam	1997	Nantong, Jiangsu, China	2008
Shulan, Jilin, China	1997	Penang Island, Malaysia	2012
Kure, Hiroshima, Japan	1999		
Ussuriysk, Russia	1999		
Himeji, Hyōgo, Japan	2000		
Mỹ Tho, Vietnam	2006		
Yamaguchi, Japan	2009		
Guadalajara, Mexico	2013		

== Notable people from Changwon ==
- Ahn Sang-soo, politician.
- Choi "Doran" Hyeon-jun (born 2000), professional League of Legends player, Top Laner for T1
- Cha Hak-yeon (stage name N), singer, entertainer, and leader of VIXX.
- Gang Dong-won, actor; he was born in Busan but grew up in Changwon
- Je Jong-geel, politician.
- Lee Won-hee (stage name Wonhee), singer, member of Illit; she was born in Busan but grew up in Changwon
- Jeon Won-woo, singer, rapper and member of Seventeen.
- Jung Byung-hee (stage name G.O), singer, actor, member of MBLAQ.
- Kim Hyung-seo (stage name Bibi), singer.
- Kim Jong Yang, member of the South Korean National Assembly, police officer, and former President of Interpol.
- Lee Elijah, actress and model.
- Lee Hye-in, actress.
- Lee Joon-gi, actor; he was born in Busan but grew up in Changwon.
- Noh Sa-yeon, singer, television personality, and radio DJ.
- Park Jin-young, singer, actor, member of Got7 and JJ Project.
- Song Do-yeong, voice actress.

== See also ==
- List of cities in South Korea
