= Masanhappo District =

- Non-autonomous District
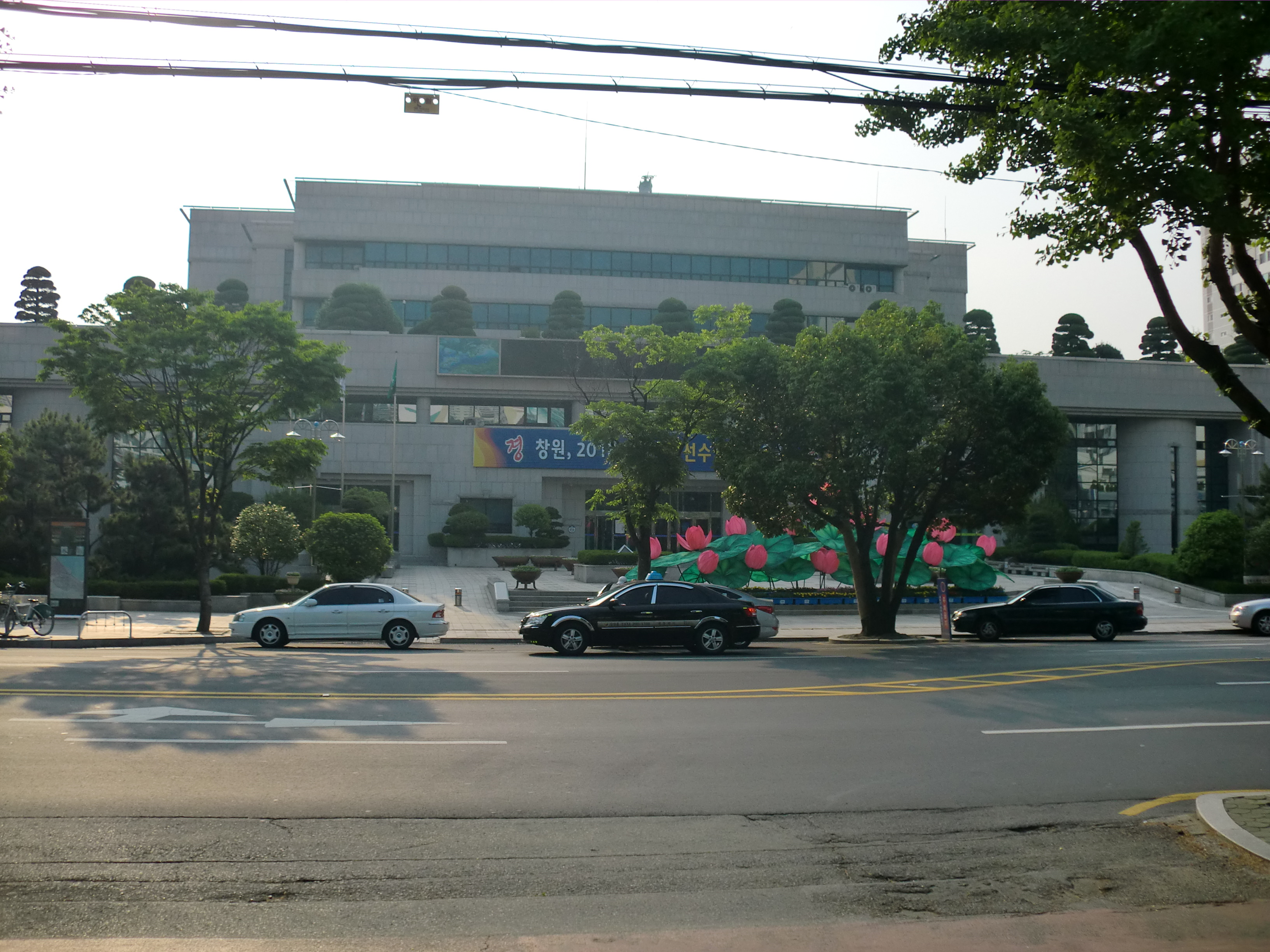
- Masanhappo-gu Office

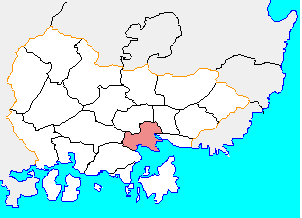
- Country: South Korea
- Region: Yeongnam
- Province: South Gyeongsang
- City: Changwon
- Administrative divisions: 4 myeon, 15 dong

Area
  - Total: 239.93 km^{2} (92.64 sq mi)

Population (2010)
  - Total: 184,000
  - Density: 766.89/km^{2} (1,986.2/sq mi)
  - Dialect: Gyeongsang
- Website: masanhp.go.kr

Korean name
- Hangul: 마산합포구
- Hanja: 馬山合浦區
- RR: Masanhappo-gu
- MR: Masanhapp'o-gu

Masanhappo District (Korean: 마산합포구), formerly known as Happo, is a district of Changwon, South Korea.

== History ==
In the late 19th century, the town was considered "one of the finest harbours in east Asia, though still only a fishing-village."

In October 1898, the Japanese, who were aiming at the control of Korea and were planning to build a railroad with its starting point at nearby Busan, began buying up land in the town; Colonel Tamura Iyozo, who was centrally involved, said the following June that "if Russia gets her hands on Masampo, Japan must become useless." In May 1899 the town became a treaty port, and the Russian navy tried to buy land for its use, only to discover that the Japanese had already acquired some of the parcels they needed. The following November, there was an ugly confrontation between Russian and Japanese seamen, and by February 1900 there was a rumor that the Russians were demanding a lease of land for military-naval use: "A large Russian squadron including the battleships Rossiya, Donskoi, and Rurik sailed from Port Arthur and weighed anchor at Masampo threateningly." The Japanese cabinet insisted that Russia not acquire any site that commanded the harbors of Koje Island, and Japan placed its fleet on a war footing. The tension was lessened by a secret agreement between Russia and Japan later that year, and the war scare was finally ended with the coming of the Boxer disturbances in June.

== See also ==
- Changwon
- Masan
