= Rail transport in South Korea =

Republic of Korea
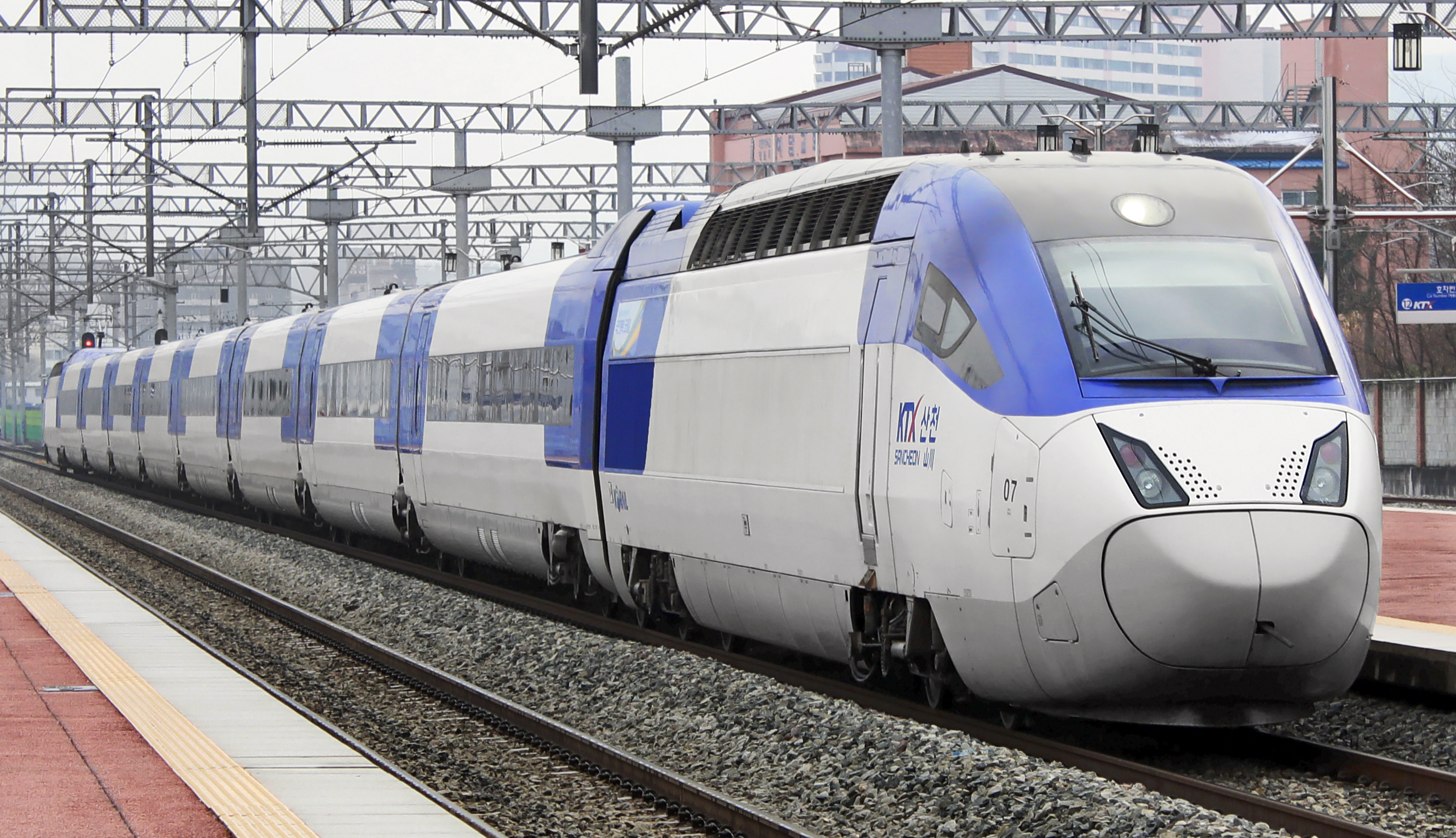
- KTX train

Operation
- National railway: KORAIL
- Infrastructure company: Korea National Railway
- Major operators: KORAIL and SR

Statistics
- Ridership: Korail: 139.5 million (2019); SR: 24 million (2019)
- Passenger-distance: Korail: 23.6 billion (2019); SR: 5.4 billion (2019)
- Freight: 28.7 million tonnes (2019)

System length
- Total: 4,285 km (2,663 mi) (2020)
- Double track: 2,790 km (1,730 mi) (2020)
- Electrified: 3,187 km (1,980 mi) (2020)
- High-speed: 625 km (388 mi)

Track gauge
- Main: 1,435 mm (4 ft 8 1/2 in)
- High-speed: 1,435 mm (4 ft 8 1/2 in)

Electrification
- Main: 25 kV AC 60 Hz
- 25 kV AC: All Korail operated network except Ilsan Line
- 1.5 kV DC: All rapid transit networks including Korail Ilsan Line

Features
- Longest tunnel: Yulhyeon Tunnel; 50.3 km (31.3 mi)
- No. of stations: Korail: 698; SR: 3
- Max elevation: 1,225 m (4,019 ft) at Chujeon station
- Min elevation: −36 m (−118 ft) at Yeouinaru station
Map
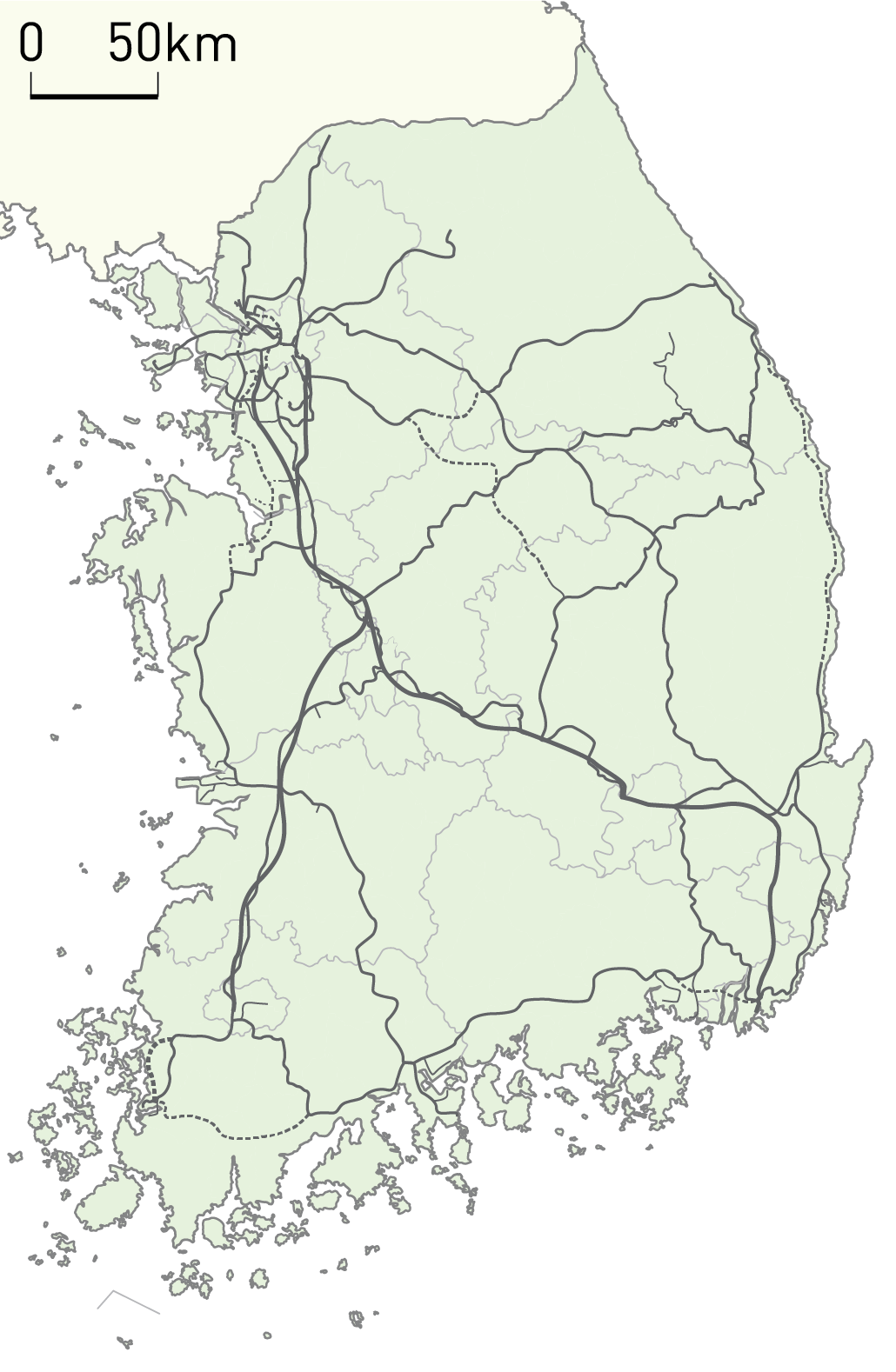
- Route Map of Korail

Railways are a part of the transport network in South Korea and an important mode of the conveyance of people and goods, though they play a secondary role compared to the road network. The network consists of 4,285 km (2,663 mi) of standard-gauge lines connecting all major cities with the exception of Jeju City on Jeju Island, which does not have railways; of the network, 2,790 km (1,730 mi) are double-tracked and 3,187 km (1,980 mi) are electrified. In 2018, rails carried 11.5 percent of all traffic in South Korea – 134.8 million passengers and 30.9 million tonnes of freight – with roads carrying 88.3 percent.

Passenger and freight services are primarily provided by the Korea Railroad Corporation, branded as Korail, a state-owned enterprise under the Ministry of Land, Infrastructure and Transport, although some rail lines and services, including high-speed intercity rails and metropolitan rapid transit, are operated by private companies. The Korea National Railway (formerly the Korea Rail Network Authority), another state company under the Transport Ministry, is responsible for constructing and maintaining the railway infrastructure, with Korail and other rail operators paying track access charges to Korea National Railway. Both Korail and Korea National Railway were created in 2004–2005 after the government decided to split the state-owned Korean National Railroad.

== History ==
=== Korean Empire and Partition ===
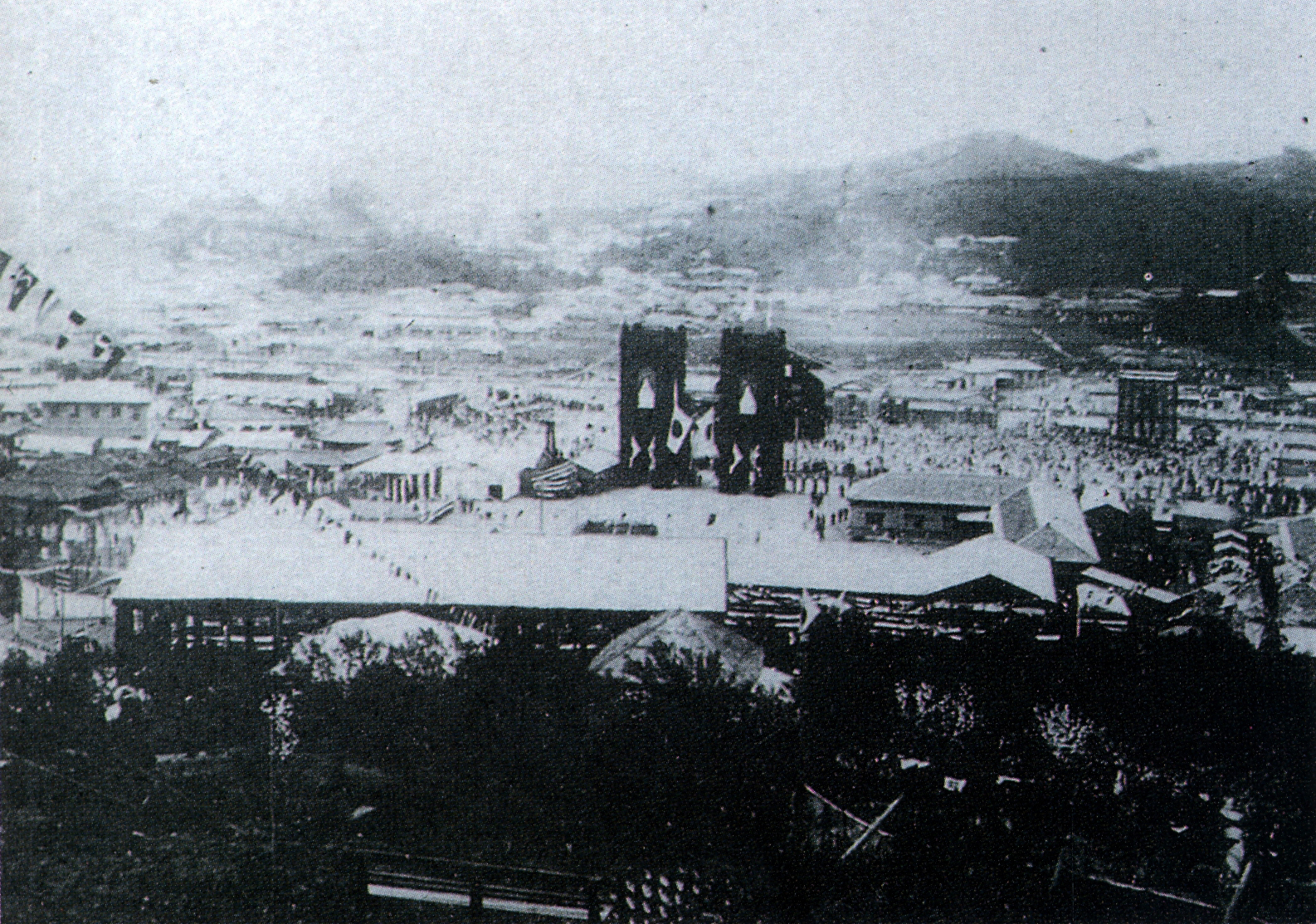
Opening ceremony of the Gyeongin Railway between Seoul and Chemulpo (today Incheon) on September 18, 1899.

Rail transport in Korea began in the late 19th century. On March 19, 1896, the late Joseon Dynasty that ruled Korea awarded American engineer James R. Morse a concession to build a railway between Seoul and Chemulpo (today Incheon), while on July 4, the French company Compagnie de Fives - Lille represented by Antoine Grille received another concession to connect Seoul and Wonsan by rail, later modified to run from Seoul to Uiju as the Gyeongui Line instead. Construction on the Chemulpo line begun on March 22, 1897, under the management of American businessmen Henry Collbran and Harry Bostwick on behalf of James Morse, but after Morse was unable to secure the necessary funding, he sold the concession to a Japanese company headed by Shibusawa Eiichi; the sale went into effect on December 31, 1898. The line was inaugurated on September 18, 1899, between Chemulpo and Yeongdeungpo on the south bank of the Han River, with the section to Seoul opening on July 9, 1900, after the construction of a bridge across the river. Additionally, on February 1, 1898, the Seoul Electric Company (today Korea Electric Power Corporation) was founded to manage electricity generation in Seoul, as well as to build tram lines in the city. The first tram line was opened on May 20, 1899, between Seodaemun and Dongdaemun (today two districts of Seoul), before the Seoul-Chemulpo railway, becoming the first railroad on the Korean Peninsula. The French surrendered their concession in 1899 for the Gyeongui Line having been unable to raise the capital necessary to fund construction, with the Korean government in turn founding the Northwest Railway Bureau and agreeing to finance building the rail to Uiju with French support. On May 8, 1902, construction started on this line under the name Northwestern Railway, from Seoul to Uiju through Kaesong and Pyongyang, with completion in 1905 under the supervision of the Japanese military.

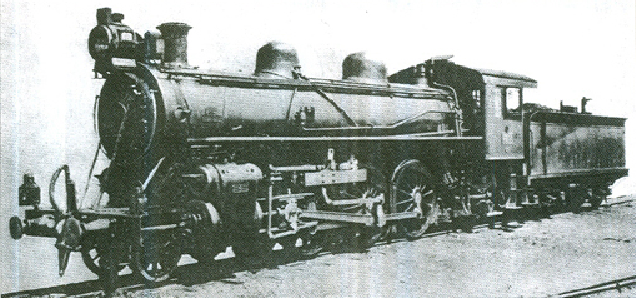
Tehosa-class steam tender locomotive built by the American Locomotive Company in 1911 for the Chōsen Government Railway.

Japan's influence on railway development in Korea begun even before Japan's occupation of Korea in 1910. On September 8, 1898, the Korean government awarded a concession to connect Seoul and Busan by rail to a Japanese company. The Japanese government in 1901 founded the Seoul‑Busan Railway Corporation to oversee construction, however, due to delays, the Japanese government took direct control of the project in 1903. Construction lasted from August 21, 1901, to December 27, 1904, with operations beginning on January 1, 1905; in the early years, the rail trip between Seoul and Busan took almost 14 hours. This and other railway lines were constructed by Japanese companies and the Japanese military to facilitate Japanese troop movements across the Korean peninsula during the Russo-Japanese War in 1904–1905 and Japan's subsequent expansion into Manchuria before and during World War II. Roadways played a secondary role to railways in Japan's military plans.

To manage the rail infrastructure and services, on July 6, 1906, the Japanese created the Railway Management Bureau under the administration of the Japanese Resident-General of Korea. On September 1, 1906, the Railway Management Bureau was merged with the Temporary Military Railway of the Imperial Japanese Army and the Gyeongbu Railway – by then the only privately owned railway operator in Korea – to create the National Railway Administration, renamed the Korea Railway Administration on December 16, 1909. After the Japanese annexed Korea in 1910, on October 1, the administration became the Railway Bureau of the Government-General of Korea. This operated for the first few years as an agency under the direct control of the Governor-General's secretariat, then from July 31, 1917, to March 31, 1925, under the management from the South Manchuria Railway, finally becoming and independent agency on April 1, 1925, as the Chōsen Government Railway.

Following World War II and during the divided occupation of Korea, from September 14, 1945, to September 7, 1948, the United States Army Military Government in Korea operated all railroads in Korea. A state-owned company was established on September 7, 1948, to take over operating the railways from the American military. The railroad network was badly damaged during the Korean War, but it was later rebuilt and improved by USATC.

=== South Korea ===
Between 1948 and 1963, the Korean government exercised direct control over the country's railways. To provide for more independent operations, on September 1, 1963, the government established the Korea National Railroad, an independent agency of the Ministry of Transportation. This agency was in charge of all rails throughout the 1970s, 1980s, and 1990s, and continued electrifying and double-tracking heavily used tracks. The first electrified test rail track in the country opened on June 9, 1972, a 10.7 kilometers (6.6 mi) stretch between Gohan and Jeongseon on the Taebaek Line; the first fully electrified line was the 155.2 kilometers (96.4 mi) long section between Jeongseon and Cheongnyangni on Jungang Line, opening on June 20, 1973.

However, government investment in railways continued to decline as a share of total investment in transportation modes, from 61 percent of all investment during the first five-year plan of 1962–1966 to 10 percent during the sixth five-year plan of 1987–1991. Roads and highways were the primary beneficiaries of this decline. While new tracks were constructed, due to the closure of tracks the length of the country's rail network only increased from 3,032 kilometers (1,884 mi) in 1962 to 3,123 kilometers (1,941 mi) in 2000. In comparison, the road network grew from 27,000 kilometers (17,000 mi) to 90,000 kilometers (56,000 mi) during the same time period.

Railroads in the 1980s were useful primarily in the transportation of freight, and they were important for passenger traffic around Seoul and in the heavily traveled corridor linking the capital with the southern port of Busan. Although the railroad system grew little during the 1980s, rail improvements – the increased electrification of tracks, replacement of older tracks, and the addition of rolling stock – allowed rail traffic to boom. Some of the busiest lines south of Seoul linking the capital with Busan and Mokpo had three or four tracks. The 1980s also saw the introduction of high-speed trains connecting Seoul with Busan, Jeonju, Mokpo, and Gyeongju. The famous "Blue Train" (Saemaul-ho) between Seoul and Busan (via Daejeon and Daegu) took only four hours and fifty minutes and offered two classes of service: first class and special. In 1987 approximately 525 million passengers and 59.28 million metric tons (65.35 million short tons; 58.34 million long tons) were transported by the railroad system.

=== Rapid transit ===
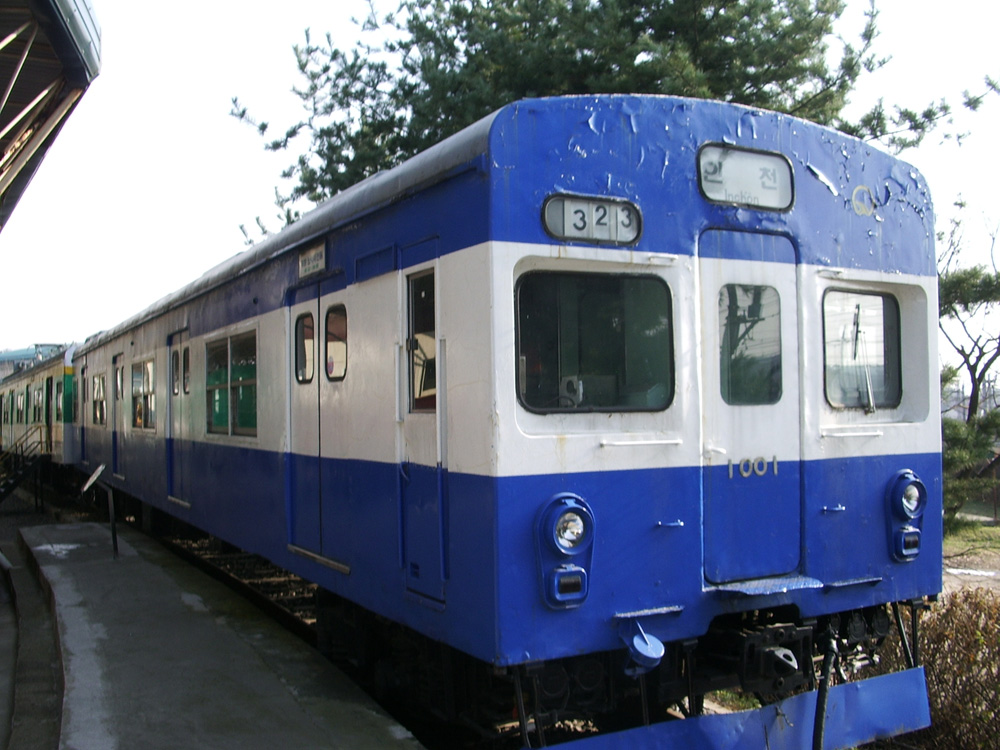
A Korail Class 1000 train, Seoul's first generation of subway cars. This particular car, Car 1001, part of Consist 101, entered service on August 15, 1974, the subway's opening day.

While investment in railroads between cities languished in the 1960s–1980s, railroads in cities continued to receive attention. Announced in 1965, the first line of the Seoul Metropolitan Subway, the first rapid transit system in South Korea, opened in 1974. Lines 2–4 followed in subsequent years as part of the first phase of construction, but construction on lines 5–8 – the second phase – was postponed in the 1980s and only started in the 1990s. Of the four planned lines in phase three, only line 9 was built, partly through a public-private partnership. As of 2021, the lines are operated by Seoul Metro, formed through the merger of Seoul Metro Corporation and Seoul Metropolitan Rapid Transit Corporation in 2017. Outside of Seoul, subways opened in Busan in 1985, Daegu in 1997, Incheon in 1999, Gwangju in 2004 and Daejeon in 2006.

=== KTX ===
The government decided to invest in Korea's first high-speed rail to ease traffic congestion between Seoul and Busan. With more than two-thirds of the country's population, passenger traffic, and freight traffic concentrated in the corridor connecting the two cities – and a new expressway built in the 1970s failing to solve traffic problems – several studies commissioned by the government in the 1970s proposed building a high-speed railroad. Construction became a priority in the 1980s, when it was included in the 1982–1986 five-year plan.

Planning started before the government decided on the rolling stock. In 1991, Korea sent a request for proposals to Japan, France and Germany, all countries with successful high-speed railways with the Shinkansen, TGV and ICE, respectively. While initially favoring the Japanese Shinkansen, Korea selected the TGV as its preferred rolling stock as the Japanese were hesitant to transfer their technological know-how to the Koreans, with the French willing to do so. The French also agreed that after building the first few train sets in France, the rest would be built in Korea with involvement from Korean companies.

In March 1992, the government created the Korea High Speed Rail Construction Authority to oversee the construction of the Gyeongbu High Speed Railway (Gyeongbu HSR). Construction started on June 30, 1992, before choosing the vehicle. The initial completion goal was 1998; lack of experience, frequent redesign, difficulties in purchasing land, and the IMF crisis delayed the entire project. As a result, Korea Train Express (KTX) service began April 1, 2004. Since its opening in 2004, the high-speed rail service has halved the demand for air transport on this corridor which used to be one of the busiest direct air routes in the world.

=== Reform and private rail companies ===
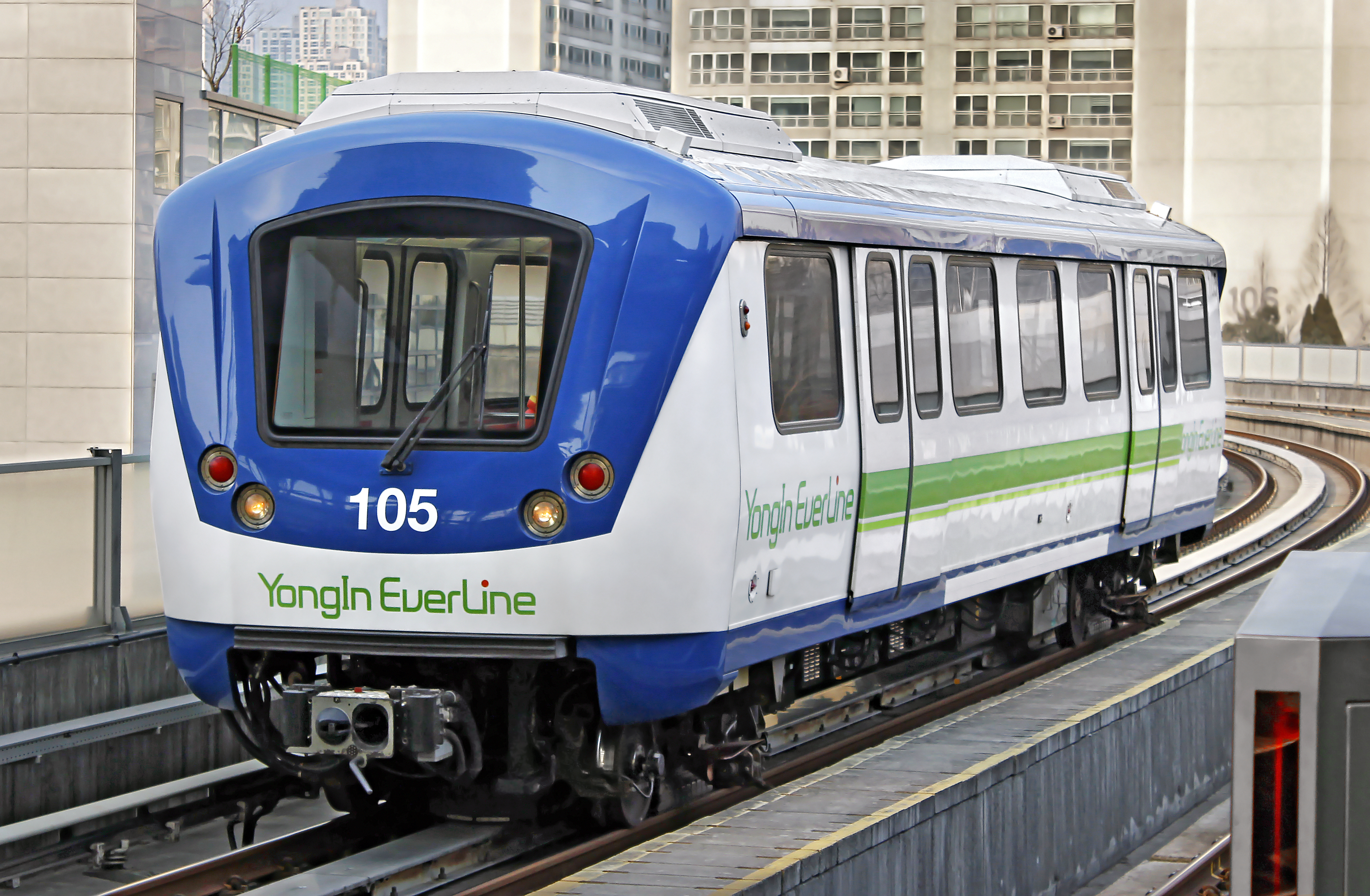
Bombardier Innovia Advanced Rapid Transit railcar on the Everline-operated people mover line in Yongin.

Private investment in railways in South Korea before the mid-1990s was nominal. Between 1968 and 1994, only 12 rail projects with a total combined cost of US$660 million received private investment, but the operation and management of all remained in government hands. In 1994, to encourage private investment in infrastructure projects through public-private partnerships, the South Korean parliament adopted the Promotion of Private Capital in Social Overhead Capital Investment Act, followed in 1998 by the Act on Private Participation in Infrastructure and in 2005 the Act on Public-Private Partnership in Infrastructure given the limited impact of the first law. PPPs can take the form of build–operate–transfer, build-lease-transfer, and build-own-operate delivery models and can be controlled by either the national or local governments. After the 1997 Asian financial crisis, several government-driven railroad construction projects were reviewed, postponed, redesigned, revoked or turned into build-operate-transfer projects. Several companies, including Macquarie Group, Shinhan Bank and Hyundai, have participated in the projects. Notably, AREX and Seoul Metro 9 are in operation, with the Seohae Line due to open in January 2023. However, due to the continuing deficit, most shares of Airport Express Co. were taken over by Korail. Several private railroads, such as Shinbundang Line, BGLRT, and Everline, have begun service as well.

The government had been aiming to improve the governance of Korean railways since the 1980s. Initially, the transportation ministry aimed to regain full control over the Korean National Railroad, which operated as an independent government agency, and re-establish it as a government-owned corporation. These efforts petered out in 1995, when government instead granted increased autonomy to KNR. In 1999, the division of KNR responsible for railway construction was merged with the Korea High Speed Rail Construction Authority, which was overseeing the building of the Gyeongbu HSR. A few years later, the government decided to split the national railroad into separate companies for operation and construction. As a result, after building Gyeongbu HSR, the Korean National Railroad was split into Korail (established in January 2004) and Korea Rail Network Authority (established in January 2005 and renamed to Korea National Railway in September 2020), the former managing operation and the latter maintaining tracks. This allowed open access in the Korean railway system. KR was constituted with old KNR infrastructure assets, and several debts due to construction of railway lines were transferred.

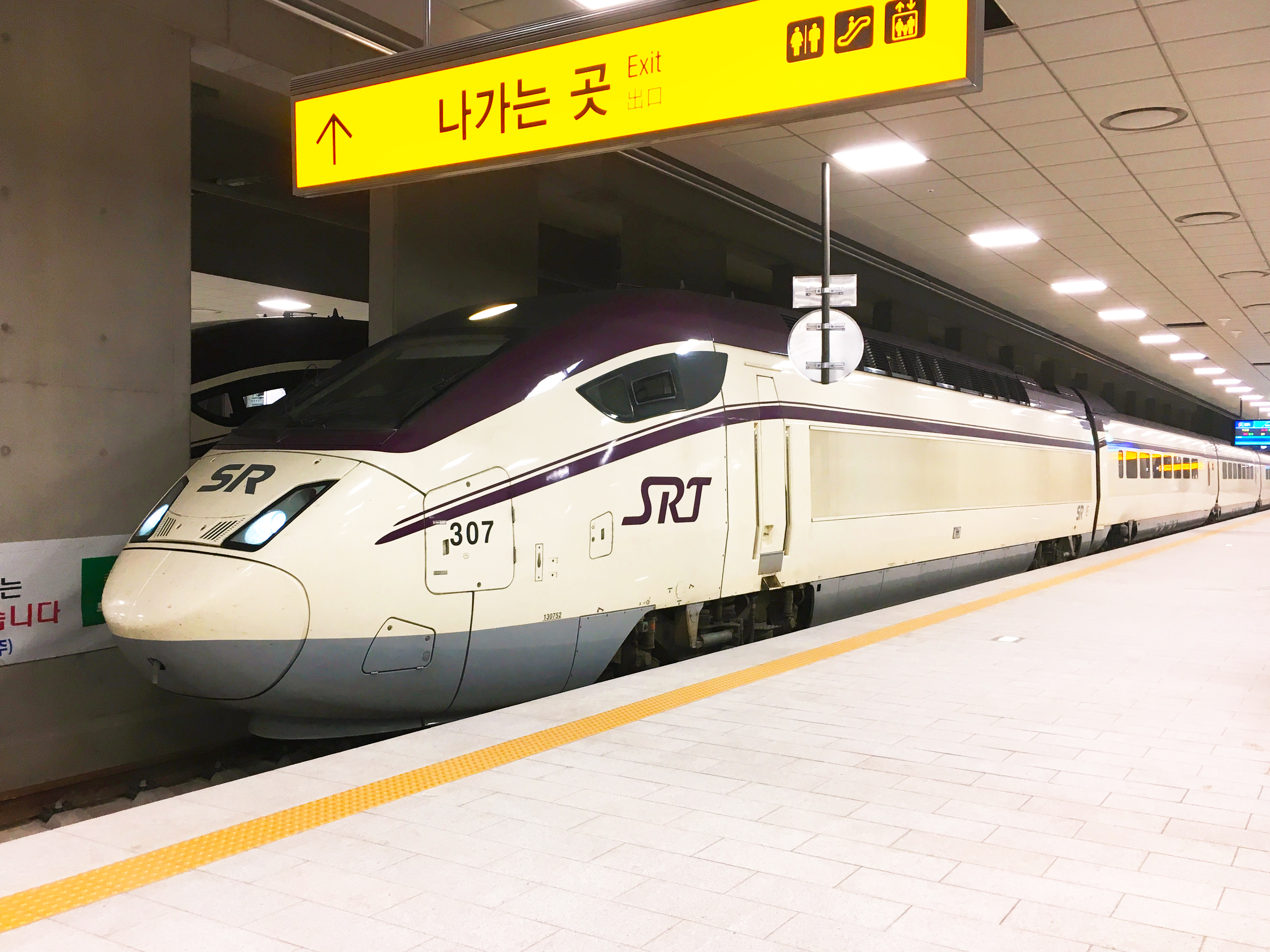
KTX-Sancheon Class 130000 train of the SR Corporation at Seoul's Suseo station.

Railway reform and the introduction of private rail companies into Korea's network continued into the 2010s. In 2012, the then-Ministry of Land, Transport and Maritime Affairs called for bids to operate high-speed trains for 15 years on the Seoul–Busan and Seoul–Mokpo lines. The ministry's goal was to end the state-owned Korail's monopoly and create competition for the state-run KTX trains, hoping to increase the quality of service and decrease fares. SR Corporation, founded in 2014, won the concession to operate the trains; though Korail owns 41 percent of its shares, a teachers' pension fund and two Korean banks own a combined 59 percent of shares, with SR thus operating independently from the government and Korail. SR's high-speed rail services were launched from Seoul's Suseo station in 2016, but within a few months, the ministry started studying the possibility of merging Korail and SR.

=== Reconnection with North Korea ===
On November 30, 2018, 30 officials from North and South Korea began an 18-day survey in both Koreas to connect the Korean railroads. The survey, which had previously been obstructed by the Korean Demilitarized Zone's (DMZ) "frontline" guard posts and landmines located at the DMZ's Arrowhead Hill, consists of a 400-kilometre (248-mile) railroad section between Kaesong and Sinuiju that cuts through the North's central region and northeastern coast. The railway survey, which involved the inspection of the Gyeongui Line, concluded on December 5, 2018. On December 8, 2018, an inter-Korean survey began in both Koreas for the Donghae Line. On December 13, 2018, it was announced that the groundbreaking ceremony to symbolize the reconnection of the roads and railways in both Koreas will be held on December 26, 2018, in Kaesong. On December 17, 2018, the latest inter-Korean railway survey, which involved an 800-kilometer (500 mi) rail from Kumgangsan near the inter-Korean border to the Tumen River bordering Russia in the east, was completed. A potential threat to the groundbreaking ceremony emerged after it was revealed that the North Korean railway was in poor condition. On December 21, 2018, however, the United States agreed to no longer obstruct plans by both Koreas to hold a groundbreaking ceremony. The same day, a four-day inter-Korean road survey began when ten working-level South Korean surveyors entered North Korea to work with ten North Korean surveyors on a three-day survey of a 100-kilometer (62 mi) long section on the eastern Donghae Line. On December 26, 2018, a groundbreaking ceremony was held in the North Korean city of Kaesong to reconnect railroads and roads between both North and South Korea. However, it was acknowledged that these reconnected North Korean railroads needed more inspection and construction in order to be active, due to deterioration.

== Traffic volume ==
Korail traffic volume by calendar year
	Passenger volume (number of journeys)	Passenger-kilometers	Freight volume (tons)	Ton-kilometers
2016	136,541,105	23,989,379,034	32,555,441	8,414,121,799
2017	136,815,092	21,935,189,633	31,669,610	8,229,194,876
2018	134,784,809	23,108,145,611	30,914,733	7,877,511,772
2019	139,531,121	23,590,036,002	28,663,738	7,357,429,858

== Railway lines ==
The principal and most used railway line is the Gyeongbu Line (경부선), which connects Seoul, the capital and largest city, with Busan, the country's second largest city and largest seaport; the second is the Honam Line (호남선), which branches off the Gyeongbu Line at Daejeon and ends at Gwangju or Mokpo.

The following is a table of major railway lines in South Korea:

Line name	Hangul name	Termini and major stations		
Gyeongbu Line	경부선	Seoul Station	Suwon, Daejeon, Dongdaegu	Busan
Gyeongbu HSR	경부고속선	Seoul Station	Suwon, Daejeon, Dongdaegu	Busan
Honam Line	호남선	Seodaejeon	Iksan, Gwangju Songjeong	Mokpo
Honam HSR	호남고속선	Osong	Iksan	Gwangju Songjeong
Suseo–Pyeongtaek HSR	수서평택고속선	Suseo	Dongtan	PyeongtaekJije
Gyeongui Line	경의선	Seoul Station	Ilsan	Dorasan
Gyeongwon Line	경원선	Cheongnyangni	Dongducheon	Baengmagoji
Chungbuk Line	충북선	Jochiwon	Cheongju, Chungju	Jecheon
Gyeongjeon Line	경전선	Samnangjin	Masan, Jinju, Suncheon	Gwangju-Songjeong
Janghang Line	장항선	Cheonan	Onyangoncheon, Hongseong	Iksan
Jeolla Line	전라선	Iksan	Jeonju, Suncheon	Yeosu Expo
Jungbunaeryuk Line	중부내륙선	Pangyo	Bubal, Chungju, Yeonpung	Mungyeong
Gyeongchun Line	경춘선	Mangu	Gapyeong	Chuncheon
Donghae Line	동해선	Bujeon	Taehwagang, Gyeongju, Pohang	Yeongdeok
Jungang Line	중앙선	Cheongnyangni	Wonju, Jecheon, Yeongju, Andong	Moryang
Yeongdong Line	영동선	Yeongju	Donghae	Gangneung
Gyeongbuk Line	경북선	Gimcheon	Sangju, Jeomchon	Yeongju
Taebaek Line	태백선	Jecheon	Yeongwol	Taebaek
Gyeonggang Line	경강선	Manjong	Pyeongchang	Gangneung
Incheon Int'l Airport Line	인천국제공항선	Seoul Station	Gimpo International Airport	Incheon International Airport Terminal 2

There is no railway service on Jeju Island.

== Services ==
Frequent service is provided on most routes, with trains every 15–60 minutes connecting Seoul to all major South Korean cities.

=== High-speed rail services ===
KTX, SRT high-speed train service map

A high-speed railroad by the name of the Korea Train Express (KTX) is in service between Seoul, Busan, Yeosu, Jinju, Donghae, Gangneung and Mokpo. The railway uses French TGV/LGV technology. Service started on April 1, 2004, using the completed high-speed line sections and using upgraded conventional lines. Another section of high-speed line sped up Seoul-Busan services from November 1, 2010. Additional services on new routes will be introduced to Masan on the Gyeongjeon Line on December 15, 2010, and to Yeosu on the Jeolla Line in April 2011. As of 2010, the top speed on dedicated high-speed track is 305 kilometers per hour (190 mph). A second operator of high speed trains, SRT, operates KTX style trains from southern Seoul's Suseo Terminal (close to the Gangnam neighborhood) to both Busan and Mokpo.

- KTX, the high-speed railway system, takes passengers from downtown Seoul to downtown Busan faster than an airplane (including check-in time), makes fewer stops and is more expensive than other trains.
  - KTX-Eum is higher-speed railway system with maximum speed 260 km/h (160 mph). It offers superior seats and standard seats.

=== Conventional rail services ===
- ITX, semi-fast trains, operates on selected lines:
  - ITX-Cheongchun (ITX-청춘) operates between Yongsan and Chuncheon via Cheongnyangni.
  - ITX-Saemaul (ITX-새마을, named after its predecessor), replaced regular Saemaul-ho service on electrified lines, provides express service on Gyeongbu, Honam, Gyeongjeon, Jeolla, and Jungang Line.
- Mugunghwa-ho (무궁화호, "Rose of Sharon") service, which is the most popular, stops at most stations, and offers a mixture of reserved and unreserved seating.
- Nuriro (누리로), which will replace mid-long distance Mugunghwa service in selected routes. Currently operates Seoul-Sinchang route and other lines.

=== Excursion luxury cruise train ===
There is currently one all-sleeper cruise train service in South Korea, operated by Korail – Rail Cruise Haerang (레일크루즈 해랑). Rail Cruise Haerang commenced operation on 28 October 2008. Currently the train operates itineraries which are curated monthly along three routes – to southeastern Korea, to southwestern Korea and a Grand Tour. The detail of travel plans changes seasonally and annually, and there are special travel plans available in certain periods. Eiji Mitooka indirectly implied that he referred to this train for the design of Seven Stars in Kyushu.

=== Rapid transit ===
South Korea's six largest cities—Seoul, Busan, Daegu, Gwangju, Daejeon and Incheon—all have subway systems.

Seoul Metropolitan Subway is the oldest system in the country, with the Seoul Station–Cheongnyangni section of Line 1 opening in 1974.

== Rolling stock ==
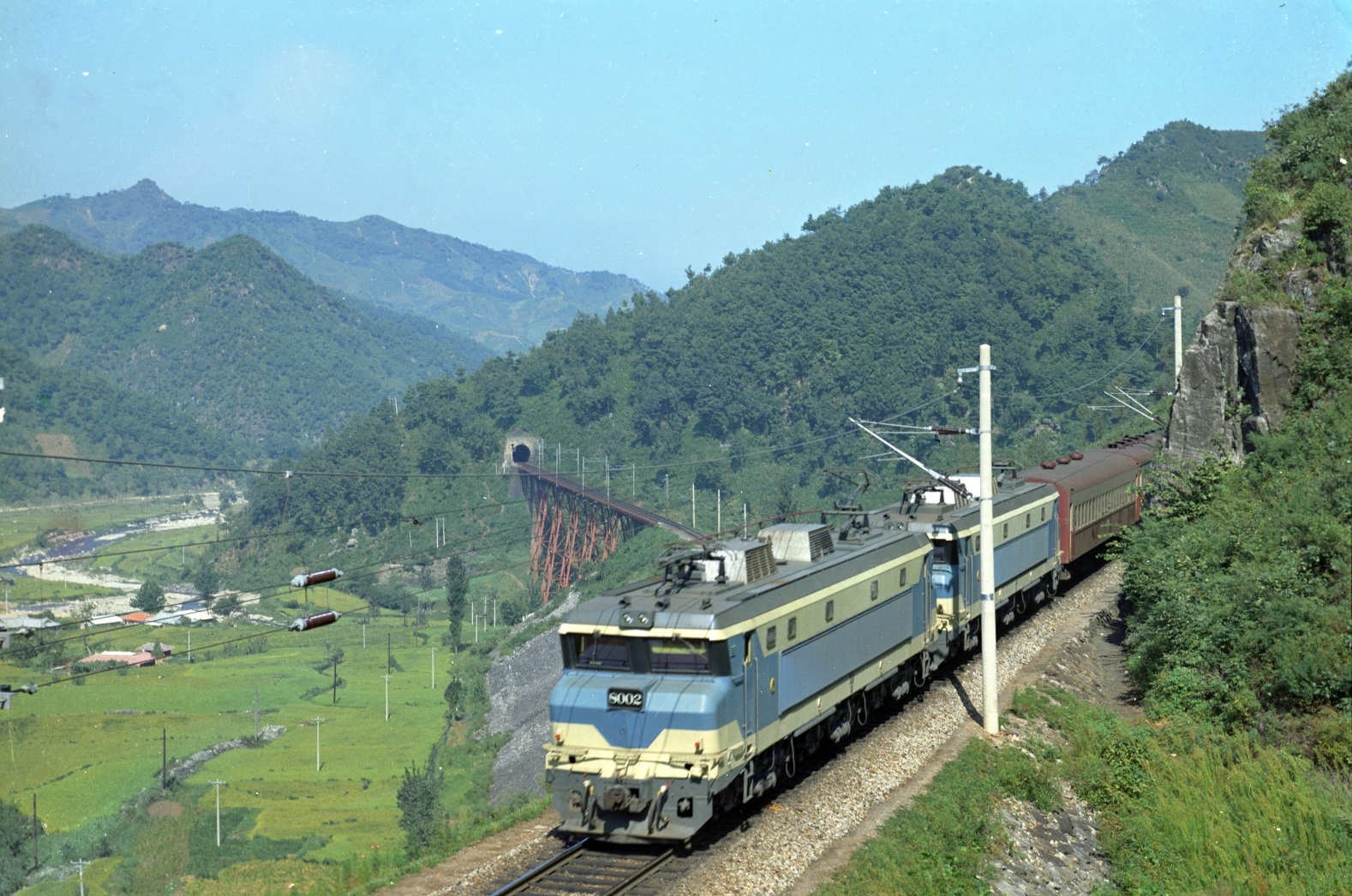
A Korail Class 8000 locomotive, the first electric locomotive in South Korea, on the Jungang Line, 21 July 1979.

The first locomotives used in Korea were steam locomotives. The locomotives used on the Gyeongin Railway when it opened on September 18, 1899, were four 2-6-0T steam tank engines built by the American Brooks Locomotive Works. They were delivered to Korea disassembled on June 17, 1899, and assembled at a factory in Incheon. Numbered 1–4, they eventually became the Chōsen Government Railway's Mogai-class locomotives. Steam locomotives remained the dominant motive power of South Korea's railways until the 1950s and the last steam engine was retired on August 31, 1967.

Diesel engines were introduced in 1955. The first diesel engines were four EMD SW8 (later classified as Korail Class 2000) switcher locomotives manufactured in the United States by General Motors Electro-Motive Division and General Motors Diesel, donated to the Korean railways by United Nations Command in March 1955. These four locomotives were among 35 locomotives dispatched to Korea to be used by United Nations and American forces during the Korean War due to the dearth of Korean railroad equipment; they arrived on Korean soil on July 15, 1951.

The first electric locomotives, the Korail Class 8000, were introduced the same year the electrification of railway lines kicked off in 1972. The first 8000 trains were assembled by the 50 C/S Group – consisting of ACEC, AEG-Telefunken, Alsthom, Brown Boveri, MTE, and Siemens – in Belgium and arrived in Korea on March 7, 1972. After a successful test run on a section of the Taebaek Line on June 9, it entered into regular service on June 20, 1973, on the Jungang Line. Initially, locomotives were mostly imported from abroad, but domestic manufacturing of electric engines began in 1976 and diesel engines in 1980.

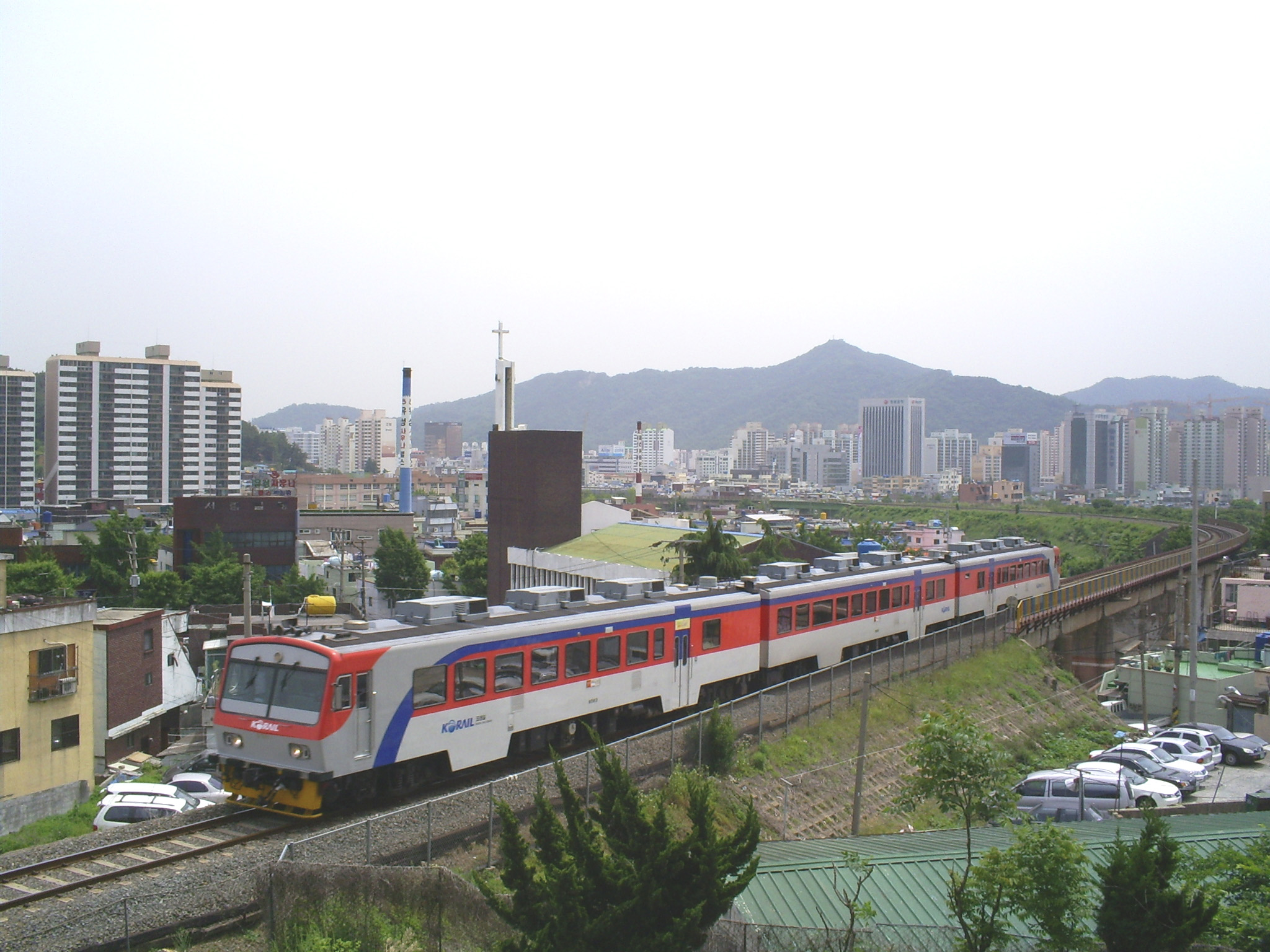
Korail Commuter Diesel Cars such as the one in the picture were, on average, the oldest rail vehicles still in service in South Korea until their retirement in December 2023.

As of 2019, Korean rail companies owned 16,180 rail vehicles, a decrease from the high of 20,100 in 1993. Of these, 1530 were KTX and 100 SR Corporation high-speed vehicles, and 254 were diesel and 175 electric locomotives. 2913 were multiple units, with 2792 being electric multiple units. The majority of all rail vehicles, 10,359 units, were railroad cars. When it came to the average age of rail vehicles, it ranged from an average of 7 years for certain higher-speed electric multiple units to 10 and 19 years for electric and diesel locomotives, respectively, to 23 years for diesel multiple units.

== International service ==
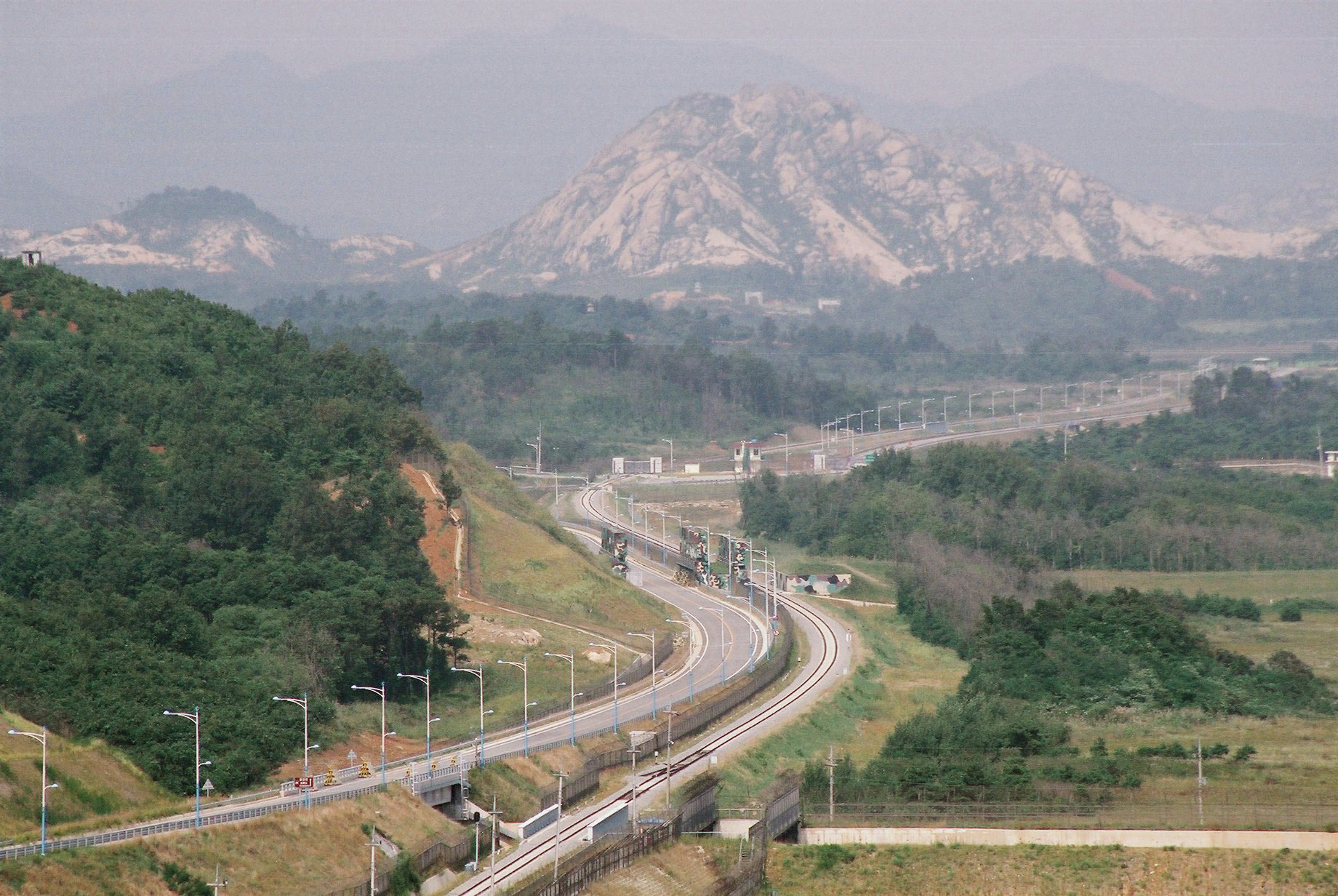
View of the inoperative Donghae Bukbu line, connecting North and South Korea, through the Korean Demilitarized Zone.

North Korea: Same gauge but not generally available. Until the division of Korea following the end of the Second World War, the Gyeongui Line and Gyeongwon Line extended into what is now North Korea. The Gyeongui Line connected Seoul to Kaesong, Pyongyang, and Sinuiju on the Chinese border, while the Gyeongwon Line served Wonsan on the east coast. Another line—the Geumgangsan Line—connected the town of Cheorwon, now on the border of North and South Korea, on the Gyeongwon Line, to Mt. Geumgang, now in the North.

The Gyeongui Line is one of two lines whose southern and northern halves are now being reconnected, the other being the Donghae Bukbu Line. On 17 May 2007, two test trains ran on the reconnected lines: one on the west line from Munsan to Kaesong; the second on the east from Jejin to Kumgang.

In December 2007, regular freight service started on the Gyeongui line, from South Korea into the Kaesong Industrial Park in the north. The service has been underused: As reported in October 2008, on 150 out of 163 return trips that had been done so far, the train carried no cargo. The amount of cargo carried over this period had been merely 340 metric tons (330 long tons; 370 short tons). This absence of interest in the service has been explained by the customers' (companies operating in Kaesong) preference for road transport. In November 2008, North Korea shut down the link. On 26 June 2018 the two Koreas agreed to reconnect the Gyeongui Line and the Donghae Bukbu Line again.

A Trans-Korean Main Line, spanning North Korea and connecting to Russian Railways, is planned.

Japan: There's no railroad connection between South Korea and Japan. But Korail and JR West have a joint rail pass (한일공동승차권) which includes discounted KTX and Shinkansen tickets with a Busan-Shimonoseki/Fukuoka ferry ticket. A Korean Strait undersea tunnel has been proposed, but the project has not progressed beyond initial planning as studies in the early 2010s showed the development not to be economical.

=== Timeline ===
==== 2008 ====
- Map of 2015 vision

==== 2018 ====
- A groundbreaking ceremony is held to symbolize to reconnection of the North and South Korea railroads.

== See also ==
- List of railway stations in South Korea
- List of railway companies in South Korea
- Transport in South Korea
- The Korea Transport Institute
- Rail transport in North Korea

== Bibliography ==
- Allen, Horace N. (1901). A Chronological Index: Some of the Chief Events in the Foreign Intercourse of Korea From the Beginning of the Christian Era to the Twentieth Century (PDF). Seoul: Methodist Publishing House.
- Byun, Seong Woo (August 1999). 한국철도차량 100년사: 철도차량기술검정단 한국철도차량 100년사 편찬위원회 편찬 [100 Years of Korean Railway Vehicles: Compilation of the 100 Year History of Korean Railroad Vehicles by the Railroad Vehicle Technology Inspection Group] (in Korean). Seoul: Railroad Vehicle Technology Inspection Team.
- Chang, Won-joo (June 24, 2015). "S. Korea's longest, rapid transit railway tunnel opens Wednesday". Pulse by Maeil Business News Korea. Maekyung Media Group.
- Cho, Nam-Geon; Chung, Jin-Kyu (2008). High Speed Rail Construction of Korea and Its Impact (PDF) (Report). KRIHS Special Report. Vol. 12. Sejong: Korea Research Institute for Human Settlements. ISBN 978-89-8182-566-9.
- Davis, Richard G., ed. (2010). U.S. Army and Irregular Warfare 1775-2007: Selected Papers From the 2007 Conference of Army Historians: Selected Papers From the 2007 Conference of Army Historians. Washington: Government Publishing Office. ISBN 978-0-16-081233-0.
- Finger, Matthias; Montero, Juan, eds. (2020). Handbook on Railway Regulation: Concepts and Practice. Cheltenham: Edward Elgar Publishing. doi:10.4337/9781789901788. ISBN 978-1-78990-178-8. LCCN 2020942921. S2CID 226633315.
- Gha, Hee-sun (June 6, 2021). "[Herald Interview] Chief of Korea National Railway maps out innovative future for railways in Korea". The Korea Herald. Seoul: Herald Corporation. Archived from the original on July 3, 2021.
- Gil, Byungwoo (April 2013). A Study on the Optimal PPP Model for Transport: The Case of Road and Rail in South Korea (PDF) (Thesis). University of Southampton Faculty of Engineering and the Environment School of Civil Engineering and the Environment.
- Hahm, Junglim (August 1, 2003). "Private Participation in the Infrastructure Programme of the Republic of Korea" (PDF). Transport and Communications Bulletin for Asia and the Pacific (72). New York: United Nations Economic and Social Commission for Asia and the Pacific Transport Division: 57–75. ISBN 92-1-120182-9. ISSN 0252-4392.
- Hwang, Sang-kyu; Kim, Gunyoung, eds. (2014). 50 Praxes for Better Transport in Korea (PDF). Goyang: The Korea Transport Institute. ISBN 978-89-5503-657-2.
- Im, Jeong Hwan (September 9, 2020). "철도시설공단, 16년만에 국가철도공단으로 새출발". New Daily (in Korean). Seoul: New Daily Co. Ltd.
- International Union of Railways (2019). "Railisa UIC Statistics". Paris: International Union of Railways.
- International Union of Railways (2021). Railway Statistics Synopsis: 2021 Edition (PDF) (Report). Paris: International Union of Railways. p. 2. Archived from the original (PDF) on July 20, 2021.
- Kang, Kee-dong; Kang, Gil-Hyun; Lee, Byung-Seok; Yoo, Ho-Shik; Jung, Young-Wan (2014). Choi, Jin-Seok (ed.). Korea's Best Practices in the Transport Sector: Korea's High-speed Rail Construction and Technology Advances (PDF) (Report). KOTI Knowledge Sharing Report. Sejong: The Korea Transport Institute. ISBN 978-89-5503-626-8.
- Kokubu, Hayato (January 2007). Shōgun-sama no Tetsudō [Shogun's Railway]. Tokyo: Shinchōsha. ISBN 978-4-10-303731-6.
- Korail (2020). 2019 철도통계연보 (I) [2019 Statistical Yearbook of Railroad (I)] (PDF) (Report). Ministry of Land, Infrastructure and Transport. Administrative publication registration number: 11-1510000-000002-10.
- Korea Railway Industry Information Center (October 7, 2010). 철도사이야기 [Railway History] (in Korean). Daejon: Korea Railway Industry Information Center.
- Lankov, Andrei (February 13, 2011). "Seoul's first subway line opened in 1974". The Korea Times. Archived from the original on January 27, 2021.
- Lee, Yong Sang (2004). "The Current State of Railways in Korea and Reform Trends". Japan Railway & Transport Review (37). Tokyo: 35–41.
- Lee, Jun, ed. (2014). The History of Korean Railway by Photographs (PDF) (Report). KOTI Knowledge Sharing Report. Sejong: The Korea Transport Institute. ISBN 978-89-5503-654-1.
- Lee, Minha; Chung, Suh-Yong (November 24, 2020). "Is Trans-Korean Railway Solely a Symbol of Peace in the Korean Peninsula?". Sustainability. 12 (23): 9815. Bibcode:2020Sust...12.9815L. doi:10.3390/su12239815.
- Park, Jin Young; Mun, Jinsu (2014). Kim, Gunyoung; Moore, Richard Andrew (eds.). Korea's Railway PPP (Public-Private Partnership) Projects (PDF) (Report). KOTI Knowledge Sharing Report. Sejong: The Korea Transport Institute. ISBN 978-89-5503-658-9. Archived from the original (PDF) on January 19, 2021.
- Pittman, Russell; Choi, Sunghee (March 2013). The Economics of Railways Restructuring in South Korea (PDF) (Report). Munich Personal RePEc Archive.
- Rew, Joung Yole (1962). A Study of the Government-General of Korea, with an Emphasis on the Period between 1919 and 1931 (Thesis). Washington, D.C.: The American University.
- Savada, Andrea Matles; Shaw, William, eds. (1992). South Korea: A Country Study. Area Handbook Series (4th ed.). Goyang: Federal Research Division, Library of Congress. ISBN 0-8444-0736-4.
- Shin, Dong-Chun (2005). Recent Experience of and Prospects for High-Speed Rail in Korea: Implications of a Transport System and Regional Development from a Global Perspective (PDF) (Report). Institute of Urban and Regional Development, University of California, Berkeley. Archived from the original (PDF) on February 24, 2021.
- Sibul, Eric A. (2011). "Medical Railroading During the Korean War 1950-1953" (PDF). Railroad History (204). Railway and Locomotive Historical Society: 49–65. ISSN 0090-7847.
- Spoonley, Dave (2023). Railways of Asia: South Korea and Taiwan. World Railways Series, Vol 8. Stamford, Lincs, UK: Key Publishing. ISBN 9781802826395.
- Tebay, Andy (June 6, 2017). "Seoul Metro operators merge". International Railway Journal. Archived from the original on 22 September 2020.
- Valliant, Robert Britton (May 1974). Japan and the Trans-Siberian Railroad, 1885–1905 (PDF) (Thesis). University of Hawaii.
