= EZL =

EZL may refer to:

== EZL ==
- EZL, successor to the Mybi smart card
- EZL, limited-edition model of Perodua Kelisa in Malay
- EZL, ignition system used by the Mercedes-Benz W124
