= Korea National Railway =

South Korean transport company

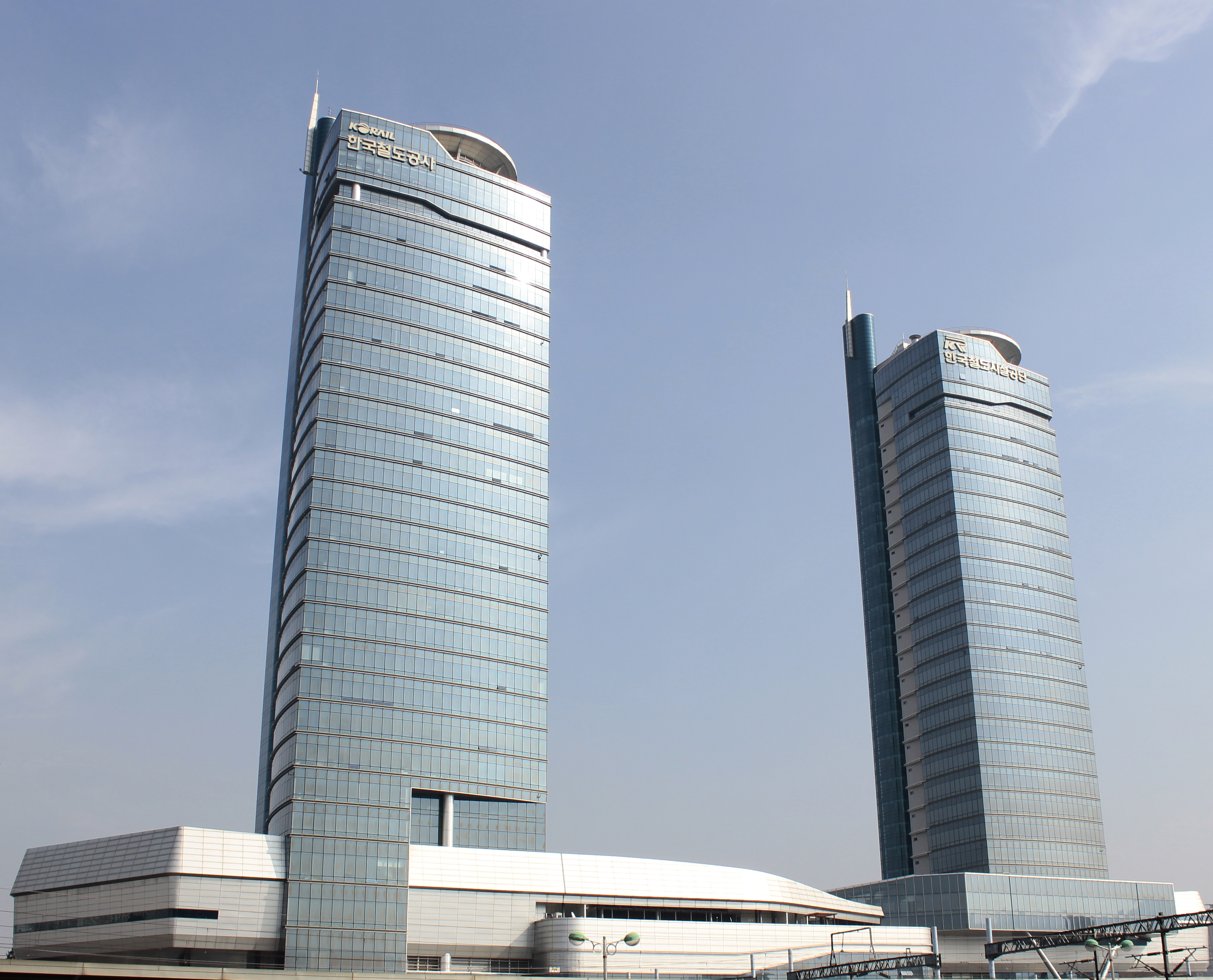
- Headquarters of Korea National Railway (right)
- Company type: Government-owned corporation
- Industry: Rail transport
- Founded: 1 September 1963; 62 years ago (as Korea Railroad Administration); 9 March 1992; 34 years ago (renamed as Korea High Speed Rail Construction Authority); 1 January 2004; 22 years ago (renamed as Korea Rail Network Authority); 10 September 2020; 5 years ago (renamed as Korea National Railway)
- Headquarters: Soje-dong, Dong-gu, Daejeon, South Korea
- Parent: Ministry of Land, Infrastructure and Transport
- Website: https://english.kr.or.kr/main.do

- Korea National Railway
- Hangul: 국가철도공단
- Hanja: 國家鐵道公團
- RR: Gukga cheoldo gongdan
- MR: Kukka ch'ŏlto kongdan

Korea National Railway (Korean: 국가철도공단) is a railroad construction and management company in South Korea formed by the merger of KNR Construction Headquarters and Korean Express Railroad Construction Corporation. Its main clients are Korail. It is a subsidiary of the Ministry of Land, Infrastructure and Transport.

Korea National Railway was established as the Korean National Railroad Administration by the Korea National Railway Act.

== History ==
During the early 2000s, the South Korean government decided to split the national railroad into separate companies for operation and construction. Consequently, the Korean National Railroad was broken up into Korail (established in January 2004) and Korea Rail Network Authority (established in January 2005 and renamed to Korea National Railway in September 2020), the former managing train operations while the latter maintains the railway infrastructure. Amongst other benefits, this change was promoted as permitting open access across the Korean railway system; Korail functioned as the incumbent operator.

It is responsible for the management of all railway infrastructure in South Korea, which includes the development of railway stations; these activities are governed and set by various railway policies, budget allocations, and safety standards. Perhaps its most high-profile undertaking of the organisation is the oversight of all railway-related construction projects. Korea National Railway works closely with train operators such as Korail. By 2018, the organisation reportedly had an annual budget of $8 billion, managed asset worth a combined $100 billion, and had 2,194 employees working for it.

Further reform of the railways and efforts to support the presence of private rail companies on Korea's railway network occurred during the 2010s. In 2012, the then-Ministry of Land, Transport and Maritime Affairs called for bids to operate high-speed trains for 15 years on the Seoul–Busan and Seoul–Mokpo lines with the goal was to end the state-owned Korail's monopoly and create competition for the state-run KTX trains, hoping to increase the quality of service and decrease fares. SR Corporation, founded in 2014, won the concession to operate the trains; though Korail owns 41 percent of its shares, a teachers' pension fund and two Korean banks own a combined 59 percent of shares, with SR thus operating independently from the government and Korail. In December 2016, SR Corporation officially launched SRT (Super Rapid Train) services, initially running between Suseo–Busan on a newly opened high speed line. Being an open-access operator, it has been charged larger fees for track access by Korea National Railway than those imposed on Korail's KTX services, paying 50 percent of its sales revenue against the KTX's 34 percent. SR Corporation has claimed that its presence has increased competition, driving down ticket prices and raising service quality overall, while also contributing to the repayments of the accumulated debts from the construction of Korea's high-speed network.
