= Korail =

National railroad operator in South Korea

Korea Railroad Corporation (Korail)

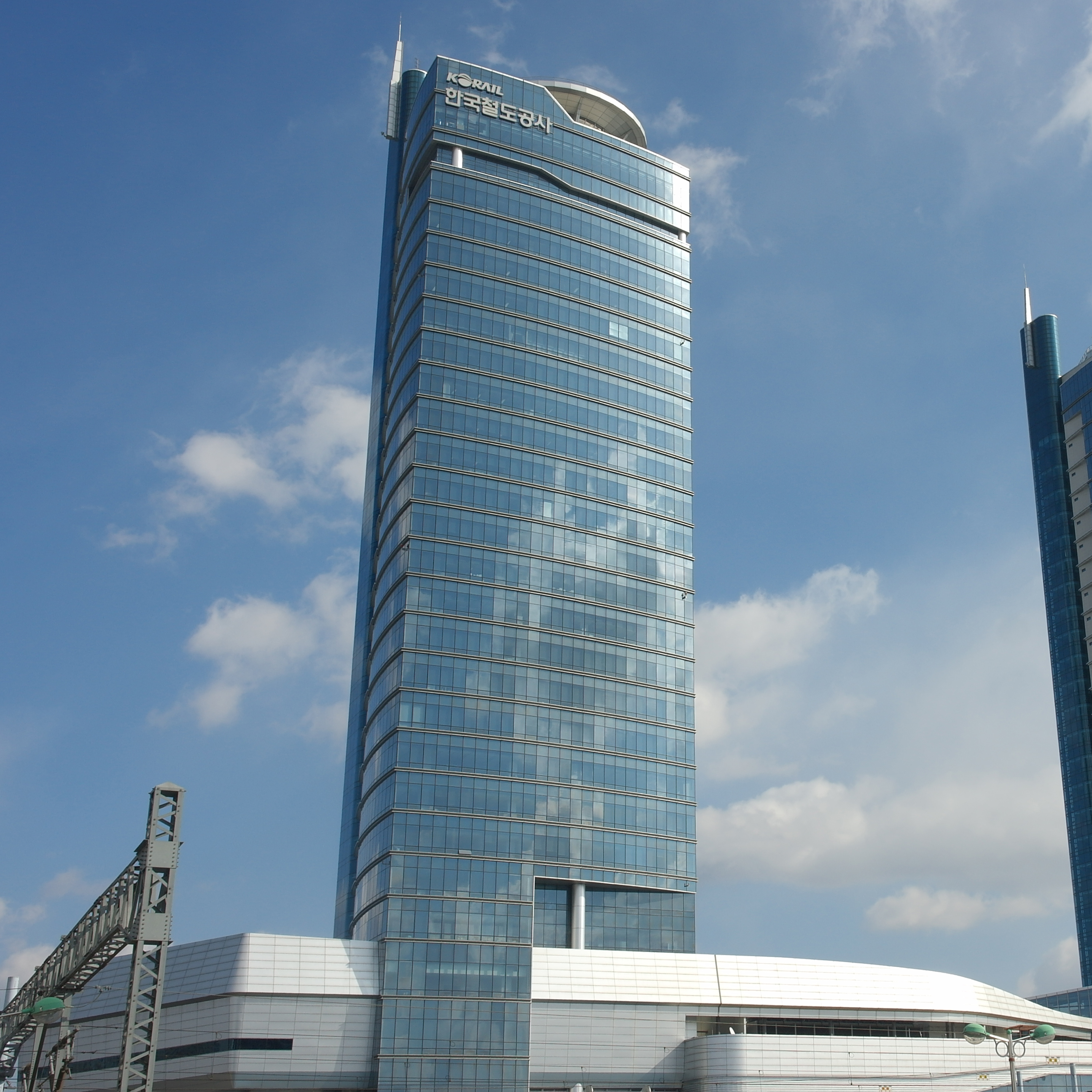
- Headquarters of Korea Railroad Corporation
- Type: Statutory corporation
- Industry: Rail transport
- Predecessor: Korean National Railroad
- Founded: 1 September 1963; 63 years ago (as Korean National Railroad); 1 January 2005; 21 years ago (renamed as Korail)
- Headquarters: Soje-dong, Dong-gu, Daejeon, South Korea
- Key people: Kim Tae-seung (CEO)
- Revenue: ₩ 5.4 trillion (2022); ₩ 5.8 trillion (2023)
- Operating income: ▼ ₩ 4743.1 hundred million (2023)
- Net income: ▼ ₩ 5424.7 hundred million (2023)
- Number of employees: 29,281 (2019); 28,329 (2018)
- Parent: Ministry of Land, Infrastructure and Transport
- Subsidiaries: SR Corporation
- Website: info.korail.com letskorail.com

Korea Railroad

Operation
- Infrastructure company: KR

Statistics
- Ridership: 969,145,101
- Passenger-distance: 31,415,965,207
- Freight: 10,553,675,728 ton km

System length
- Total: 4,128.6 km (2,565.4 mi)
- Double track: 2,706.5 km (1,681.7 mi)
- Electrified: 3,043.0 km (1,890.8 mi)
- High-speed: 1,264.7 km (785.8 mi)

Track gauge
- Main: 1,435 mm (4 ft 8 1/2 in)
- High-speed: 1,435 mm (4 ft 8 1/2 in)

Electrification
- AC 25,000 V 60 Hz: 3,023.8 km (1,878.9 mi)
- DC 1,500 V: 19.2 km (11.9 mi)

Features
- No. of stations: 691
- Max elevation: 855 m (2,805 ft) at 37°12′0″N 128°56′59.83″E

- Korea Railroad Corporation
- Hangul: 한국철도공사
- Hanja: 韓國鐵道公社
- RR: Hanguk cheoldo gongsa
- MR: Han'guk ch'ŏlto kongsa

The Korea Railroad Corporation (Korean: 한국철도공사) is the national railway operator in South Korea. It is branded as KORAIL (코레일) and changed its official Korean name (한국철도) in November 2019. Currently, KORAIL is a government-owned corporation, managed by Ministry of Land, Infrastructure and Transportation.

KORAIL operates intercity/regional, commuter/metro and freight trains throughout South Korea, and has its headquarters in Daejeon.

== History ==
Historically, the South Korean railway network was managed by the Railroad Administration Bureau of the Ministry of Transportation before 1963. On 1 September 1963, the bureau became an agency that was known as Korean National Railroad (KNR) in English. In the early 2000s, the split and public corporatization of KNR was decided by the South Korean government, and in 2003, KNR adopted the current KORAIL logo in blue to prepare for corporatization. On 1 January 2005, KNR was split into Korea Railroad Corporation (KORAIL), which succeeded railway operation with the KORAIL logo and name, and Korea National Railway (KR), which succeeded in railway construction and maintaining tracks.

== Finances ==
Fares are set according to distance.
KORAIL has posted losses every year for the last decade, with the exception of 2015.
In 2021 alone, the deficit was 1.1081 trillion won.
As of the end of 2021, the cumulative deficit is 18.66 trillion won.

Rail fares have been frozen since they were raised by 4.9% in 2011.

In the 2021 public institution management evaluation, KORAIL was given the lowest grade of E (extremely unsatisfactory).

== Services ==
Excluding the other high-speed service provider, SR, South Korean high-speed and intercity services are provided by KORAIL. Currently, KORAIL provides 5 classes of railway and metro services.

=== KTX ===
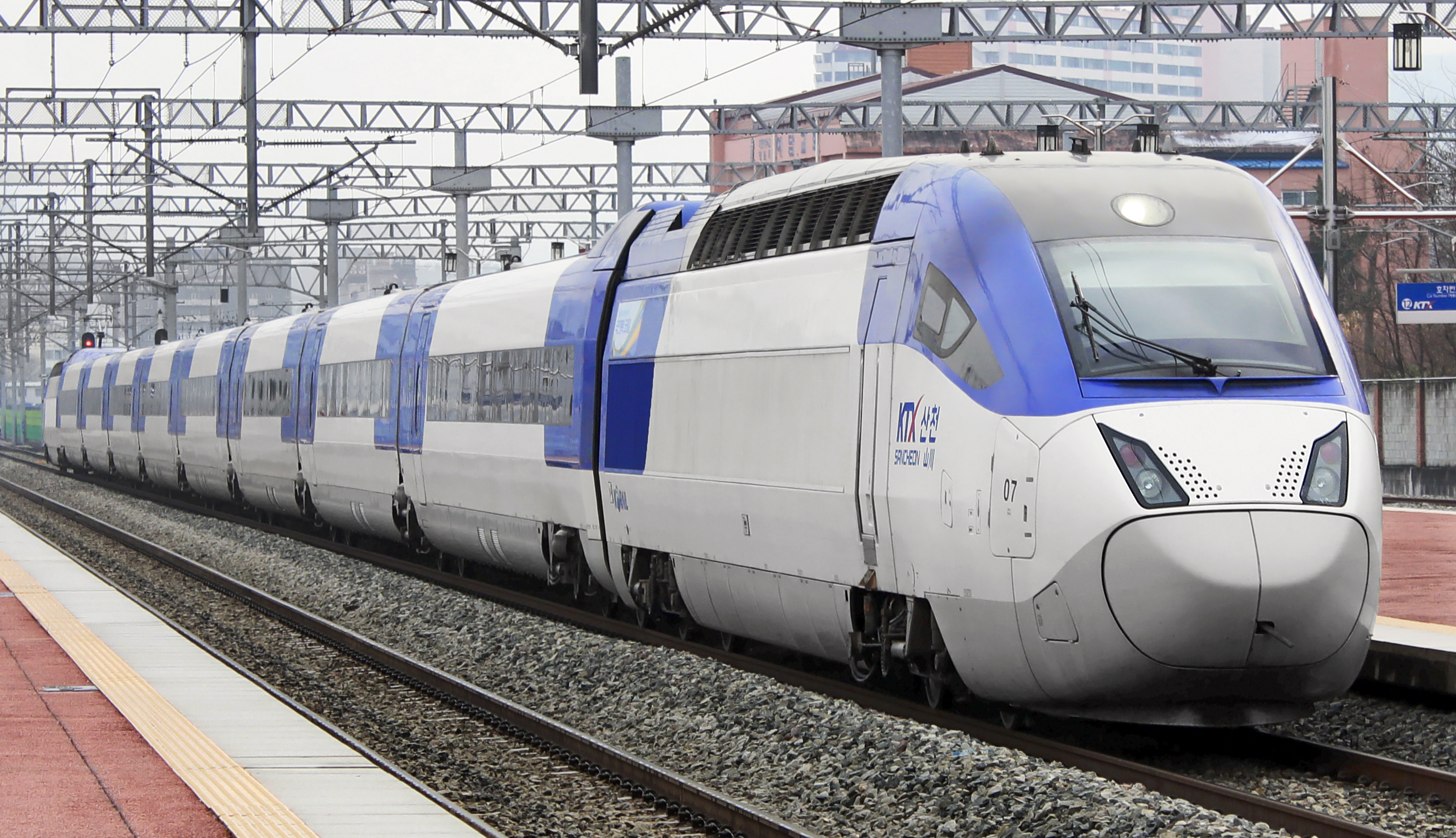
KORAIL KTX-Sancheon Class 110000

KTX (Korea Train eXpress) is currently the highest class of KORAIL services. KTX services are provided on the Gyeongbu HSR and Honam HSR, as well as their branches such as Gyeongjeon Line, Donghae Line, or Jeolla Line.

=== ITX ===
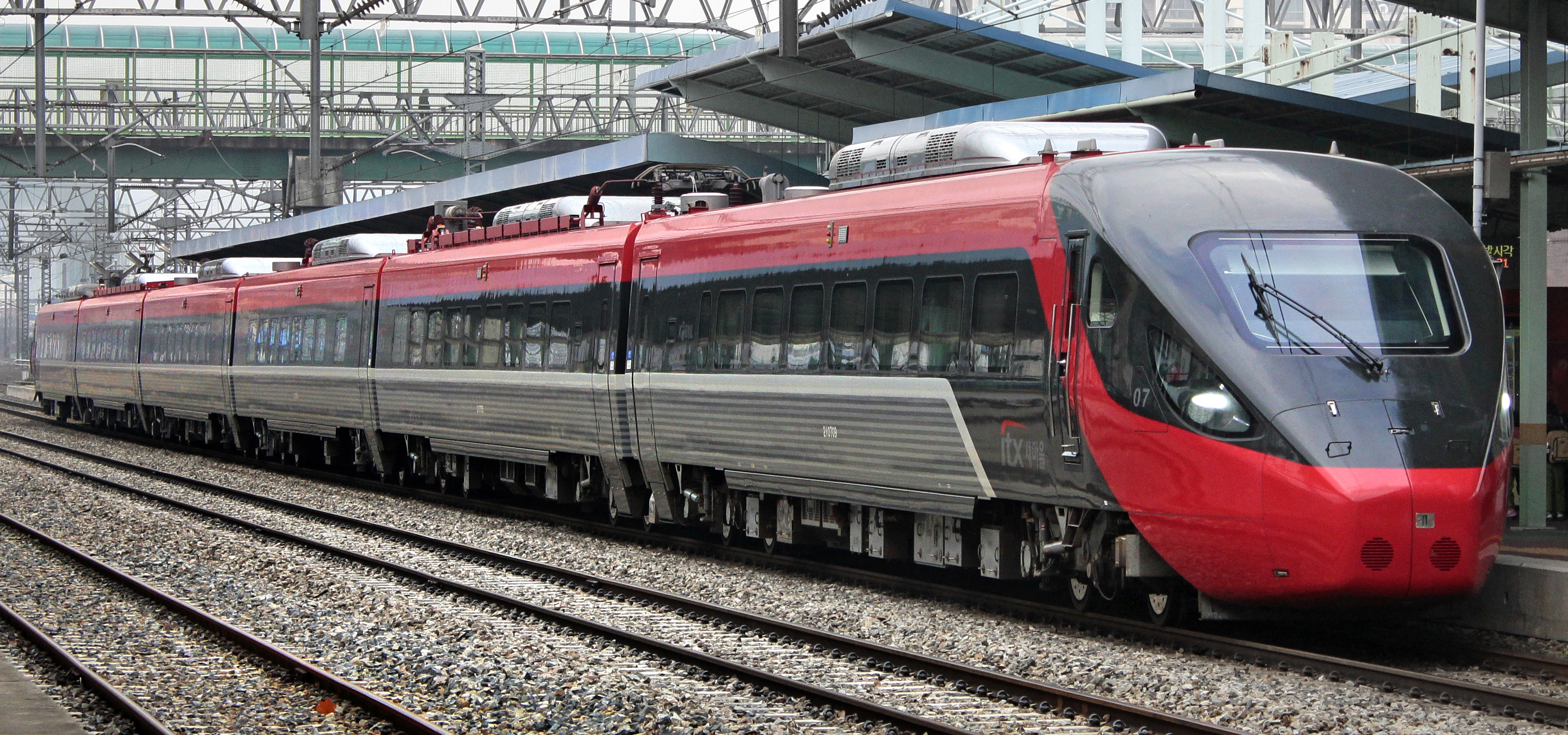
KORAIL ITX-Saemaeul Class 210000

ITX (Intercity Train eXpress) are a group of intercity services. The first ITX service was introduced in 2012, which was named ITX-Cheongchun (ITX-청춘) on Gyeongchun Line.

Before the introduction of ITX services, intercity trains were named Saemaul-ho (새마을호), which borrowed its name from the New Community Movement. Later, Saemaul-ho services are merged into ITX as ITX-Saemaeul (ITX-새마을). Currently, the remaining Saemaul-ho services are only operated on Janghang Line.

In late 2023, another new ITX train equivalent to ITX-Saemaeul was introduced and named ITX-Maum.

=== Mugunghwa-ho and Nuriro ===
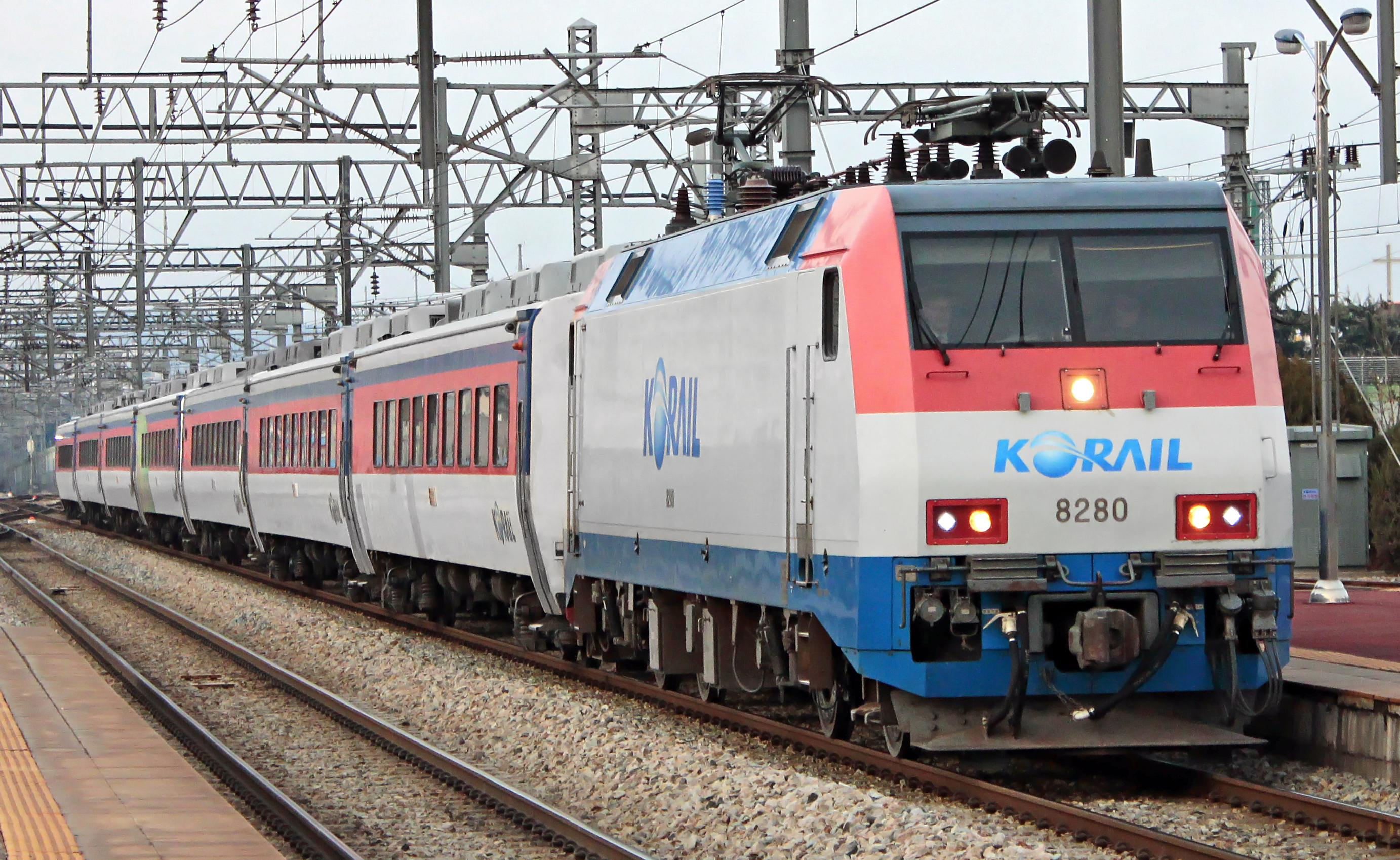
KORAIL Mugunghwa-ho

Mugunghwa-ho (무궁화호) and its planned successor Nuriro (누리로) services are regional train services of KORAIL. Mugunghwa-ho, inspired by its name from the national floral emblem hibiscus, was introduced as express service at first, but after the introduction of KTX, it was degraded into regional services.

Currently, Nuriro services are provided by only EMU trains (class 20). KORAIL has a plan of introducing Nuriro with the newly ordered EMU-150.

=== Urban railway services ===
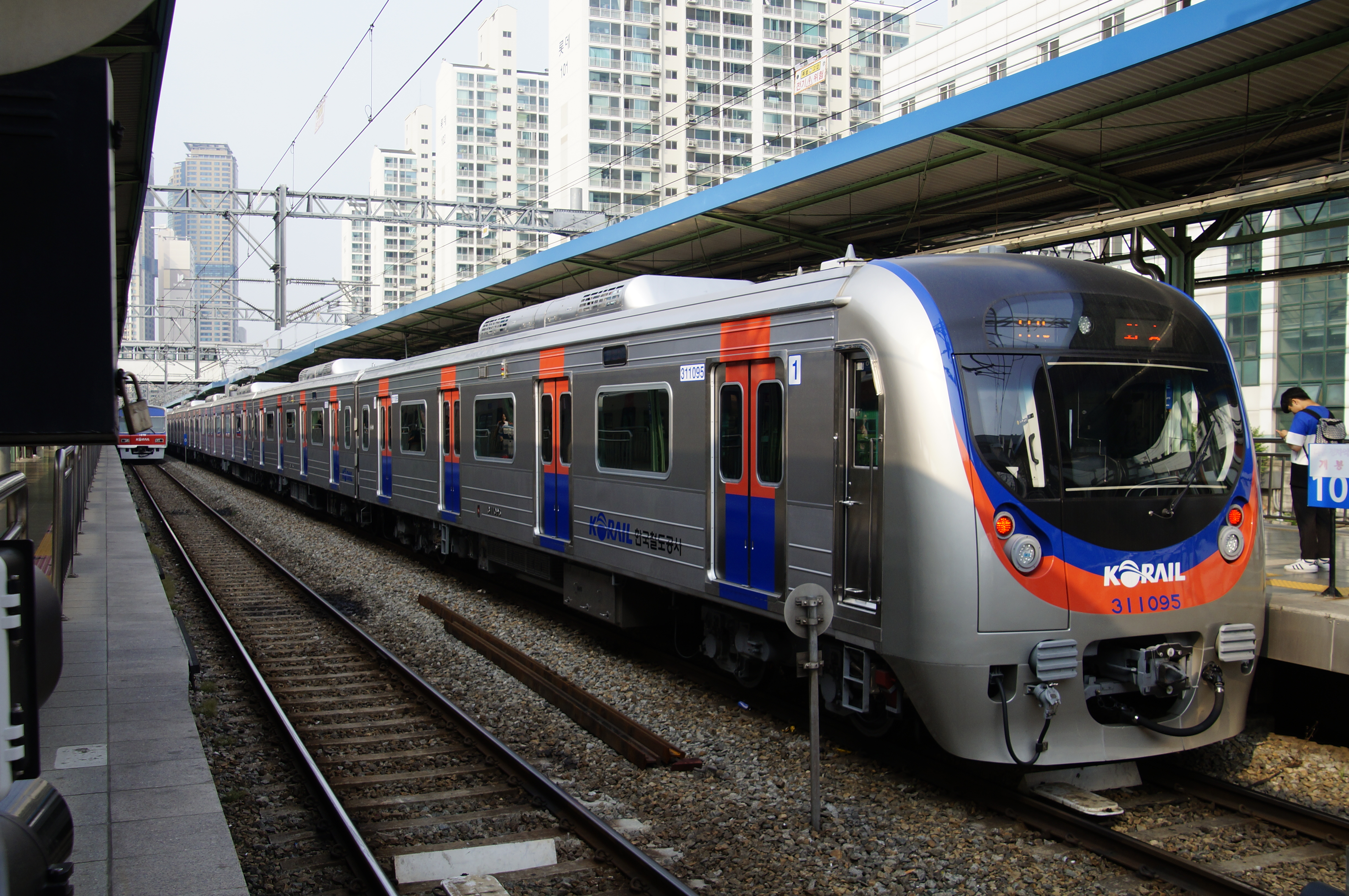
KORAIL Class 311000 EMU

Named as metro services (전동열차), these services are provided in the Seoul Metropolitan Area and the Busan Metropolitan Area. Sometimes it is considered as a successor of Bidulgi-ho (비둘기호) class trains. Officially, the fare systems of these services are separate from other services operated by Korail; such services are integrated with subway fare systems, allowing free transfers between Korail-operated lines and local metro lines.

==== Seoul ====
Line 1 is a large service corridor consisting of the following Korail lines that through operate to and from Seoul Metro Line 1

Gyeongbu Line — (Namyeong–Cheonan)
Gyeongin Line — (Guro–Incheon)
Gyeongwon Line — (Yeoncheon–Hoegi)
Janghang Line — (Cheonan–Sinchang(Soonchunhyang Univ.))

Line 3

Ilsan Line — (Jichuk–Daehwa) with through operation to Seoul Metro Line 3

Line 4 is a long service corridor consisting of the following Korail lines that through operate to and from Seoul Metro Line 4

Jinjeop Line — (Jinjeop–ByeollaeByeolgaram)
Ansan Line — (Geumjeong–Oido)
Gwacheon Line — (Seonbawi–Geumjeong)

a large service corridor consisting of the following lines:

Bundang Line (1994) — (Cheongnyangni–Suwon)
Suin Line (2012) — (Suwon–Incheon)

— (Seoul–Chuncheon)
a large service corridor consisting of the following lines:

Gyeongui Line — (Seoul–Munsan)
Gyeongwon Line — (Hoegi–Yongsan)
Jungang Line — (Cheongnyangni–Jipyeong)
Yongsan Line — (Yongsan–Gajwa)

Gyeonggang Line — (Pangyo–Yeoju)

==== Busan ====
Donghae Line — (Bujeon–Taehwagang) is part of Donghae Line service

== Sightseeing trains ==
KORAIL has a number of tourist or sightseeing trains, including the Sea Train, DMZ Train, V-Train, S-Train, A-Train, and G-Train.

== Passes ==
Korail offers a rail pass called Korea Rail Pass, or KR Pass for short, to foreign travelers, such that they can take most of the trains operated by Korail freely, including KTX. However, subways and tourist trains operated by KORAIL are not covered.

Foreigners living in South Korea for more than six months are ineligible to use a KR Pass, but Korail offers the Happy Rail Pass, which is very similar to the KR Pass, for a slightly higher price.

== Labor relations ==
Most of the railroad's employees are members of the Korean Railway Workers' Union, which is frequently at odds with KORAIL management. Strikes, such as the South Korean railroad strike of 2006, are not uncommon.

In December 2013, 23,000–100,000 union members and friends protested the privatization of KORAIL in Seoul.

== Subsidiaries ==
- Korail Networks, for ticketing management and Korail frequent riders program.
- Korail Retail, for advertisement management and running "Storyway" convenience store.
- Korail Tour Service, for KTX/Saemaeul-ho train crew and travel service.

== International service ==
- North Korea (Korean State Railway):

Until the division of Korea following the end of the Second World War, the Gyeongui Line and Gyeongwon Line extended into what is now North Korea. The Gyeongui Line connected Seoul to Kaesong, Pyongyang, and Sinuiju on the Chinese border, while the Gyeongwon Line served Wonsan on the east coast. Another line—the Kumgangsan Electric Railway—connected the town of Cheorwon, now on the border of North and South Korea, on the Gyeongwon Line, to Mt. Geumgang, now in the North.

The Gyeongui Line is one of two lines whose southern and northern halves are now being reconnected, the other line being the Donghae Bukbu Line. On 17 May 2007, two test trains ran on the reconnected lines: one on the west line from Munsan to Kaesong; the second on the east from Jejin to Kumgang.

In December 2007, regular freight service started on the Gyeongui line, from South Korea into the Kaesong Industrial Park in the north. The service has been underutilized, however: as it was reported in October 2008, on 150 out of 163 return trips that had been done so far, the train carried no cargo at all. The total amount of cargo carried over this period had been merely 340 tons. This absence of interest in the service has been explained by the customers' (companies operating in Kaesong) preference for road transport. In November 2008, North Korea shut down the link. However, railroad transportation from South Korea to North Korea resumed again on 30 November 2018, when a South Korean train carrying railroad inspectors entered North Korea.

A Trans-Korean Main Line, spanning North Korea and connecting to Russian Railways, is being planned. On 30 November 2018, 30 officials from North and South Korea began an 18-day survey in both Koreas to connect the Korean railroads. The survey, which had previously been obstructed by the Korean Demilitarized Zone's (DMZ) "frontline" guard posts and landmines located at the DMZ's Arrowhead Hill, consists of a 400-kilometer (250 mi)-long railroad section between Kaesong and Sinuiju that cuts through the North's central region and northeastern coast. The railway survey, which involved the inspection of the Gyeongui Line, concluded on 5 December 2018. On 8 December 2018, an inter-Korean survey began in both Koreas for the Donghae Line.

On 13 December 2018, it was announced that the groundbreaking ceremony to symbolize the reconnection of the roads and railways in both Koreas will be held on 26 December 2018 in the North Korean city of Kaesong. On 17 December 2018, the latest inter-Korean railway survey, which involved an 800-km rail from Kumgangsan near the inter-Korean border to the Tumen River bordering Russia in the east, was completed. A potential threat to the groundbreaking ceremony emerged after it was revealed that the North Korean railway was in poor condition. On 21 December 2018, however, the United States agreed to no longer obstruct plans by both Koreas to hold a groundbreaking ceremony. The same day, a four-day inter-Korean road survey began when ten working-level South Korean surveyors entered North Korea to work with ten North Korean surveyors on a three-day survey 100-km-long section on the eastern Donghae Line. On 24 December 2018, the four-day road survey, which will assist with the groundbreaking ceremony for the railroad, was completed after a separate team of ten South Korean surveyors entered North Korea and joined ten North Korean surveyors to survey a 4-km-long road in Kaesong. On 26 December 2018, the groundbreaking ceremony was held as scheduled in Kaesong. About 100 South Korean officials attended the ceremony after departing to North Korea on a Korail train based at Dorasan Station in Palu.

- Japan

JR Kyushu offered a jet foil ferry service between Busan and Fukuoka taking about three hours. KORAIL and JR West had a joint rail pass (called 한일공동승차권) which included discounted KTX and Shinkansen tickets and Busan-Shimonoseki/Fukuoka ferry tickets, but the pass was discontinued due to low ridership. In 2024, the service was discontinued owing to various safety issues deemed irrepairable.

There are no railway connections between both countries. The Korean Strait undersea tunnel connecting Fukuoka and Busan via Tsushima had been proposed as far back as 1917, but the plan has never progressed beyond the research phase. While the increased wealth of South Korea and continued growth of trade between the nations has made the economic case for the tunnel more compelling, promotion has focused more on using the project to reduce political tension between the nations.

== See also ==
- List of suburban and commuter rail systems
- Daejeon Korail FC, Korea National League football team.
- Korea Rail Network Authority
- KTX Family Card, frequent riders program
- Transportation in South Korea
