= Mybi =

Fare collection system in South Korea

The Mybi (Korean: 마이비) card is a kind of contactless smartcard used in South Korea. This system was introduced in 2000 as a new fare collection system for the Busan area. It is now discontinued. See EZL. Lotte started a new name and united fare card. (eB card → Upass + Mybi = cashBee)

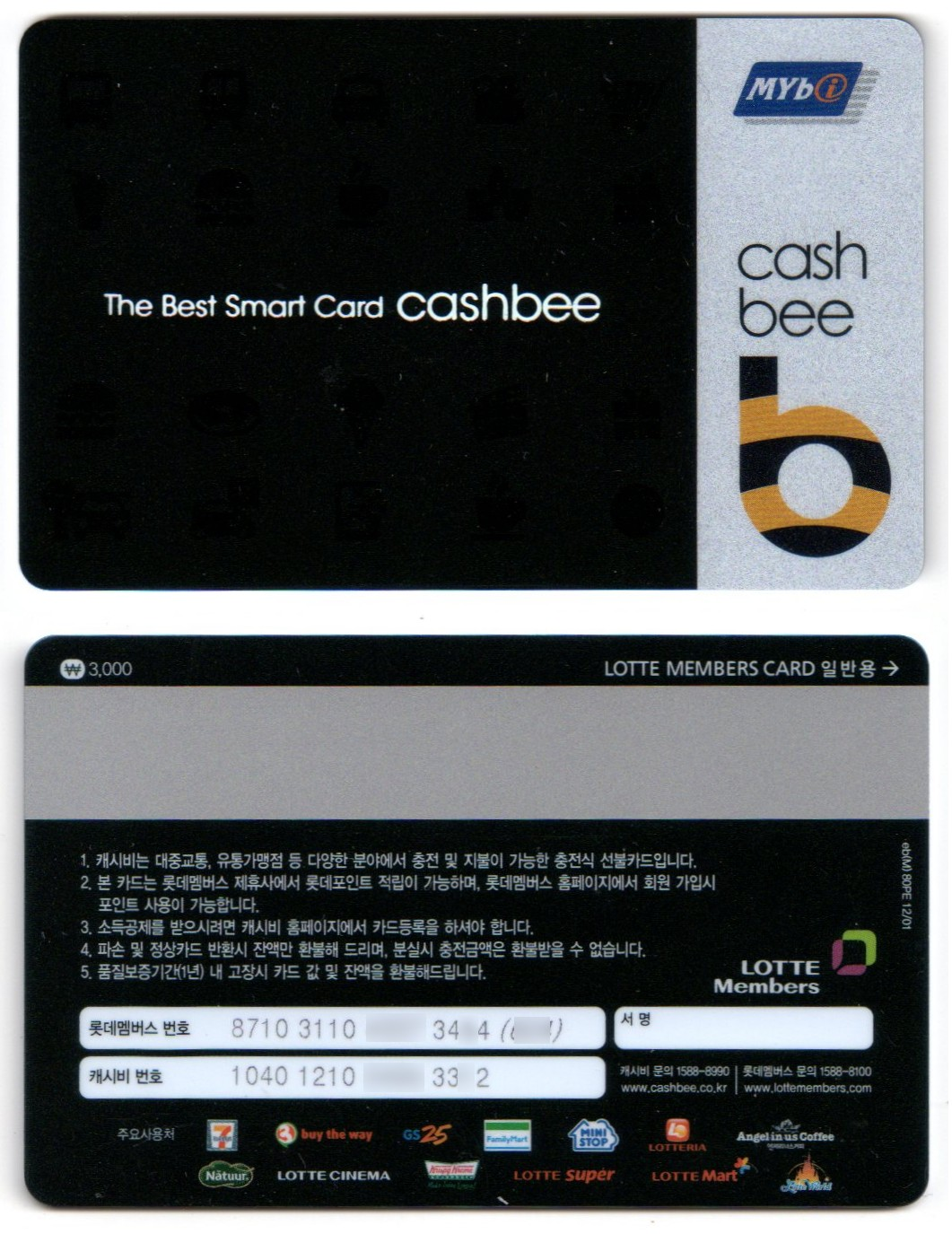

== Technology ==
Mybi uses MIFARE Standard 1k and PROX technology.

== Compatibility ==
KB Free Pass and KTX Family Card are Mybi-compatible systems.

== Areas ==
Mybi was used in many areas.

- Busan (Digital Busan Card): Metro, taxi, bus, toll road, parking lot
- Ulsan (Digital Ulsan Card): Bus
- Jinju (Digital Gyeongnam Card): Bus
- Changwon (Digital Gyeongnam Card): Bus
- Gimhae (Gimhae For You Card): Bus
- Yangsan (Digital Gyeongnam Card): Bus
- Sacheon (Digital Gyeongnam Card): Bus
- Gimcheon, Gumi (Sinnari Card): Bus
- Gyeongju (Digital Busan Card, Digital Ulsan Card): Bus
- Gwangju (Bitgoeul Card): Metro, bus
- Chuncheon: Bus
- Wonju: Bus
- Taebaek, Pyeong Chang, Samcheok, Gang Reung, Sok Cho, Yeong Weol, Jeong Sun: Bus
- Seoul: bus, and subway
- All of the Chungcheongbukdo area (Ettum e-Card): bus
- All of the Chungcheongnamdo area (Digital Chungnam Card): bus
- All of the Jeollabukdo area (Sinmyungie Card): bus
- All of the Jeollanamdo area (Digital Yehyang Jeonnam Card): bus
- AREX

== See also ==
- Hanaro Card
- KTX Family Card
