= List of railway stations in South Korea: A =

List of railway stations in South Korea

A	B	C	D	E	F	G	H	I	J	K	M	N	O	P	R	S	T	U	W	Y	Z

This list shows the railway stations in South Korea that begin with the letter A. This is a subset of the full list of railway stations in South Korea.

== Station list ==
Ara Station	아라역
Ami Station	아미역
Cheonan Asan Station	천안아산역
Asiad Stadium Station	아시아드경기장역
Ashin Station	아신역
Ayanggyo Station	아양교역
Auraji Station	아우라지역
Ajung Station	아중역
Achasan Station	아차산역
Apo Station	아포역
Ahyeon Station	아현역
Ahwa Station	아화역
Agang Station	아강역
Anguk Station	안국역
Andong Station	안동역
Annak Station	안락역
Ansan Station	안산역
Ansim Station	안심역
Anam Station	안암역
Anyang Station	안양역
Anin Station	안인역
Anjeong Station	안정역
Anjung Station	안중역
Anjirang Station	안지랑역
Anpyeong Station, Busan	안평역
Anpyeong Station, Jangseong	안평역
Amsa Station	암사역
Amsa History Park Station	암사역사공원역
Angseong Hot Spring Station	앙성온천역
Apgujeong Station	압구정역
Apgujeong Rodeo Station	압구정로데오역
Amlok Station	암록역
Aeogae Station	애오개역
