= Rail transport in North Korea =

Map of North Korean railroads

Rail transport in North Korea is provided by Korean State Railway (조선 민주주의 인민 공화국 철도성, Chosŏn Minjujuŭi Inmin Konghwaguk Ch'ŏldosŏng) which is the only rail operator in North Korea. It has a network of over 6,000 km of track, of which the vast majority is standard gauge; there is, however, nearly 400 km of narrow gauge lines (762 mm) in various locations around the country.

== Routes ==
In many cases, the name of the line is a portmanteau of the original termini. However, because of the division of Korea, some lines now terminate short of their original destinations. The following lists the main standard-gauge trunk lines:

- Hambuk Line: Ch'ŏngjin Ch'ŏngnyŏn - Rajin, 331.1 km (205.7 mi)
- Kangwŏn Line: Kowŏn - P'yŏnggang, 145.8 km (90.6 mi)
- Manp'o Line: Sunch'ŏn - Manp'o, 299.9 km (186.3 mi)
- Paektusan Ch'ŏngnyŏn Line: Kilchu Ch'ŏngnyŏn - Hyesan Ch'ŏngnyŏn, 141.7 km (88.0 mi)
- P'yŏngbu Line: P'yŏngyang - Kaesŏng (-> Dorasan, ROK), 187.3 km (116.4 mi)
- P'yŏngdŏk Line: P'yŏngyang - Kusang Ch'ŏngnyŏn, 192.3 km (119.5 mi)
- P'yŏngnam Line: P'yŏngyang - Namp'o, 55.2 km (34.3 mi)
- P'yŏngra Line: P'yŏngyang - Rajin (and on to Khasan, Russia), 819.0 km (508.9 mi)
- P'yŏngŭi Line: P'yŏngyang - Sinŭiju (and on to Dandong, China), 225.1 km (139.9 mi)

== Pyongyang Metro ==
The Pyongyang Metro operates the only known underground mass transit in North Korea. Metro services are also supplemented with above-ground tram services in both Pyongyang and a number of secondary cities.

== International services ==
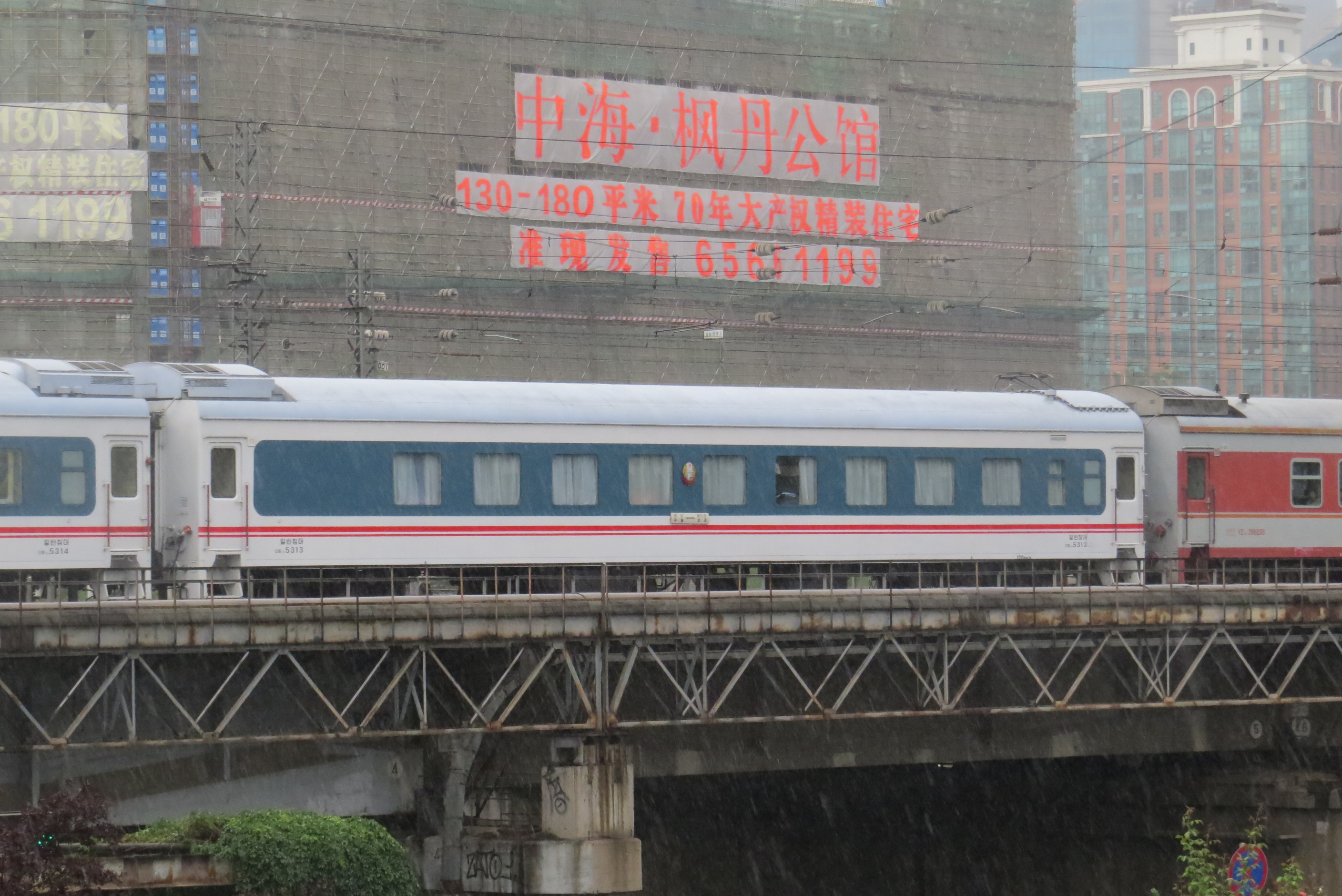
North Korean 다침30-type coach on K27/28 Beijing-Pyongyang train; Based on China Railways 25G coaches, these coaches were built in China.

=== China ===
The primary rail gateway to North Korea is via the Sino–Korean Friendship Bridge from Dandong, China to Sinuiju, North Korea. Passenger trains are taken as far as Dandong by the China Railway at which point the domestic Chinese carriages are uncoupled and North Korean carriages and locomotive are attached. There are several other active border crossings with China, including at Manp'o and at Namyang.

=== Russia ===
Rajin has a rail link to the Russian Railways system over the Friendship Bridge across the Tumen River in the North Korea–Russia border. There is transborder passenger service from Pyongyang to Moscow, with a Korean rail car taken across the border (with bogies changed to the Russian gauge), and eventually attached to a Vladivostok-Moscow train.

Since 2013 the line over the Tumen River to Rajin is rebuilt with dual gauge track, so that standard gauge and Russian broad gauge trains from the Russian Khasan can access the port of Rajin. Railway and port are operated in a joint venture with the Russian RasonKonTrans.

=== South Korea ===
In 2000, a freight service was inaugurated, between South Korea and the industrial park at Kaesong; however, usage has been very low and most trains carry no freight. North Korea purposely detonated a section of the track on its side of the border in October 2024, rendering the line unusable.

== Future plans ==
A Trans-Korean Main Line is planned, spanning North Korea and allowing South Korean rail freight access to Russian Railways.

== Gallery ==
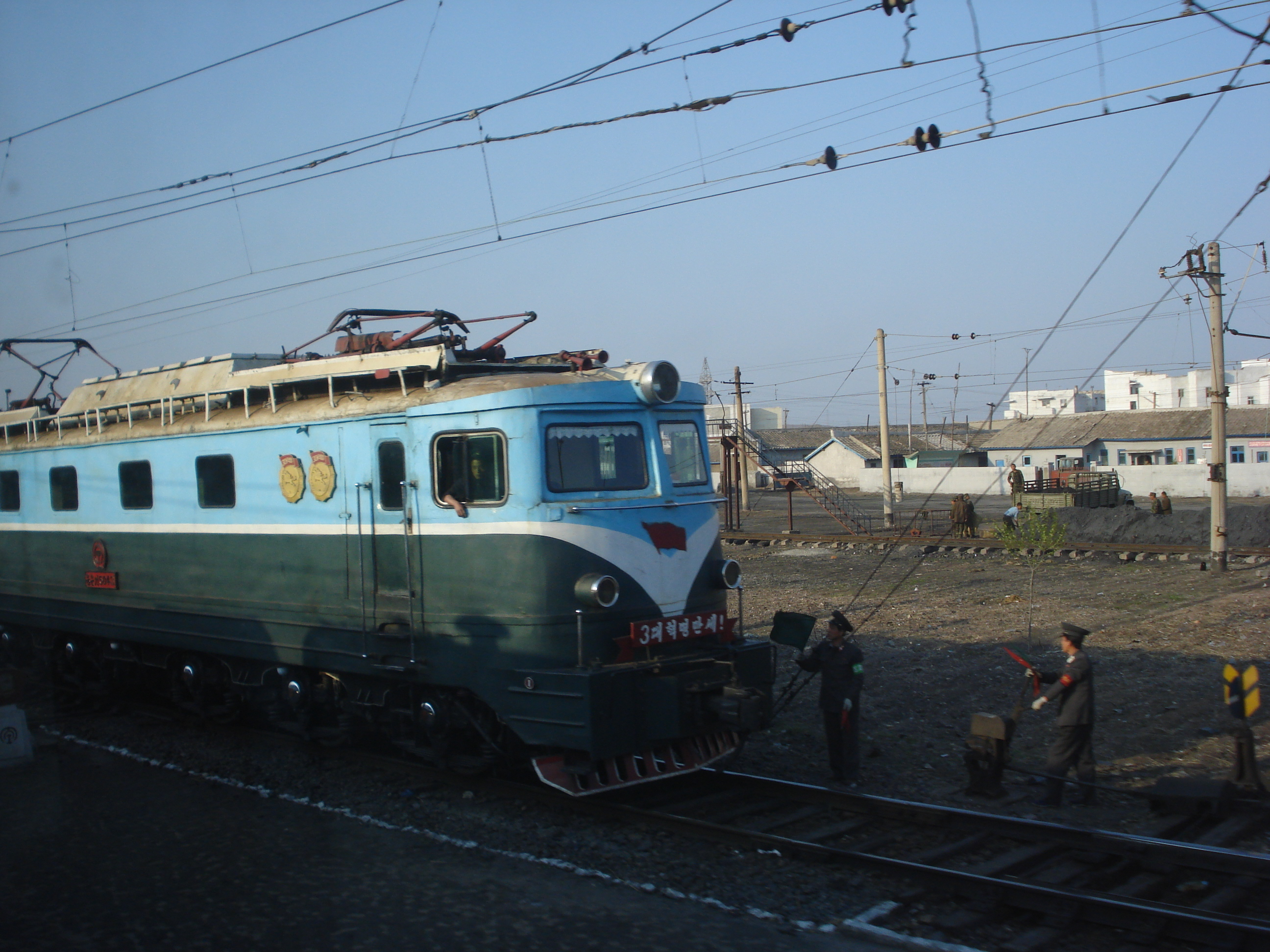
Locomotive in North Korea

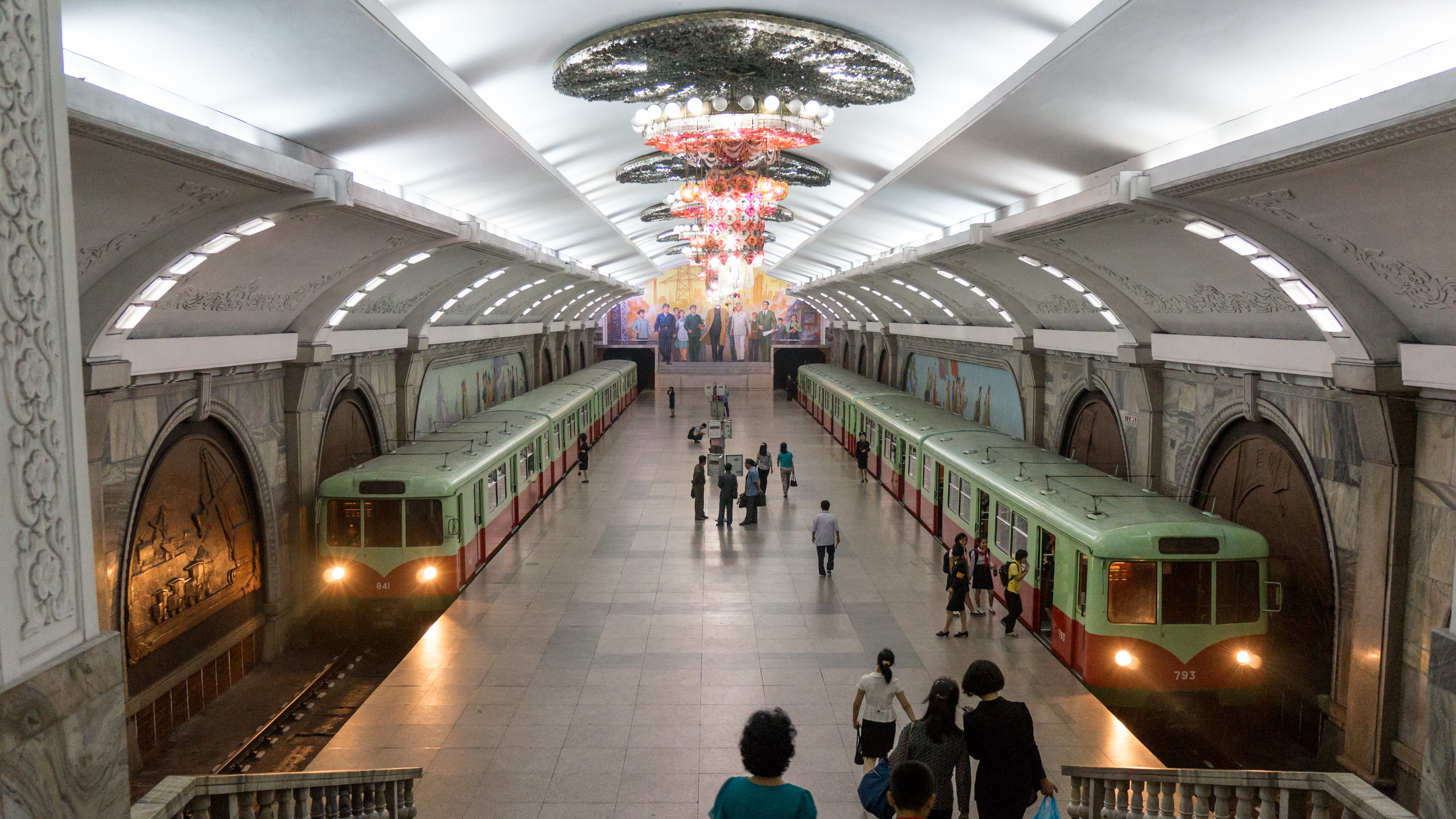
Pyongyang Metro

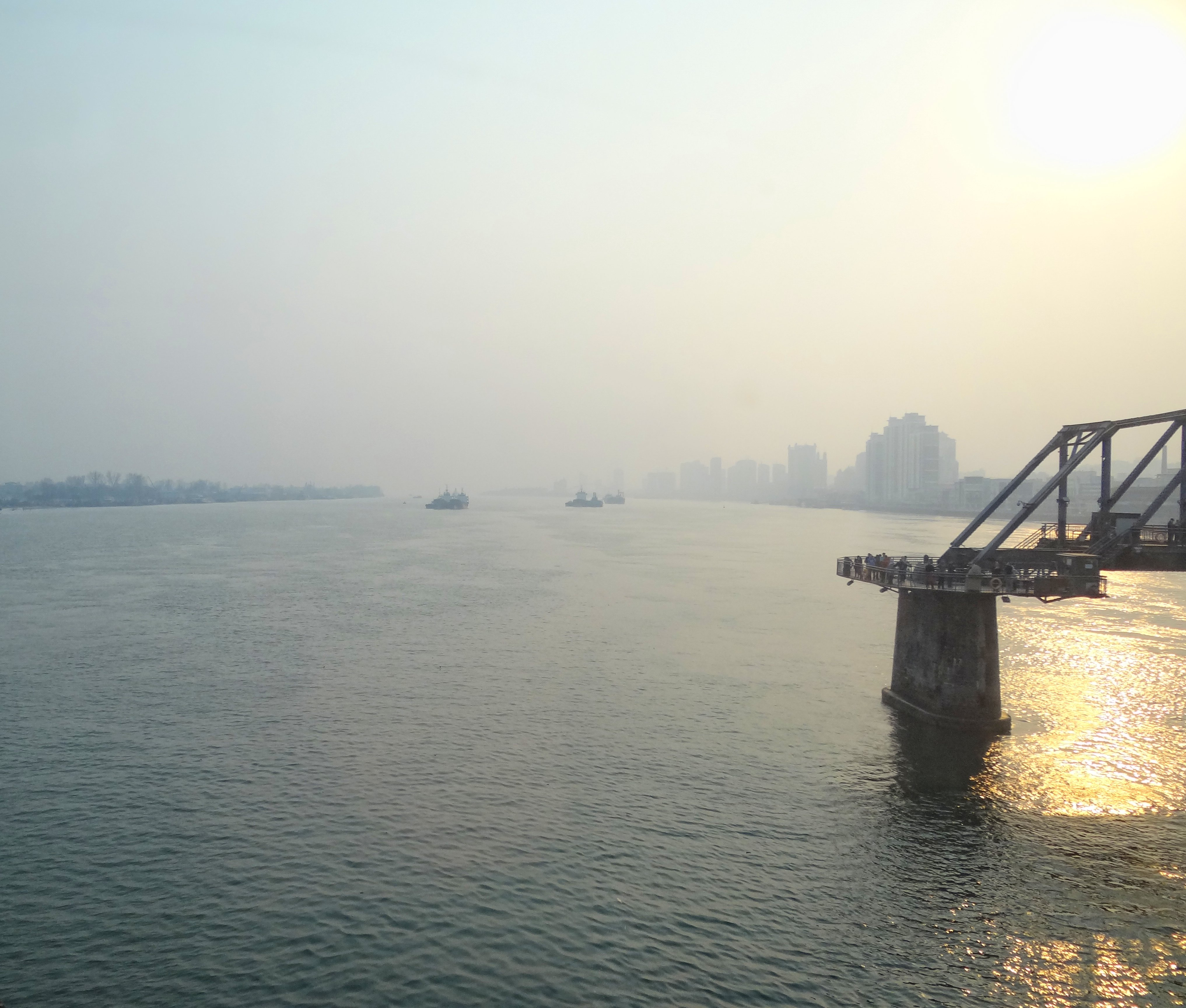
Crossing into North Korea on the Sino–Korean Friendship Bridge

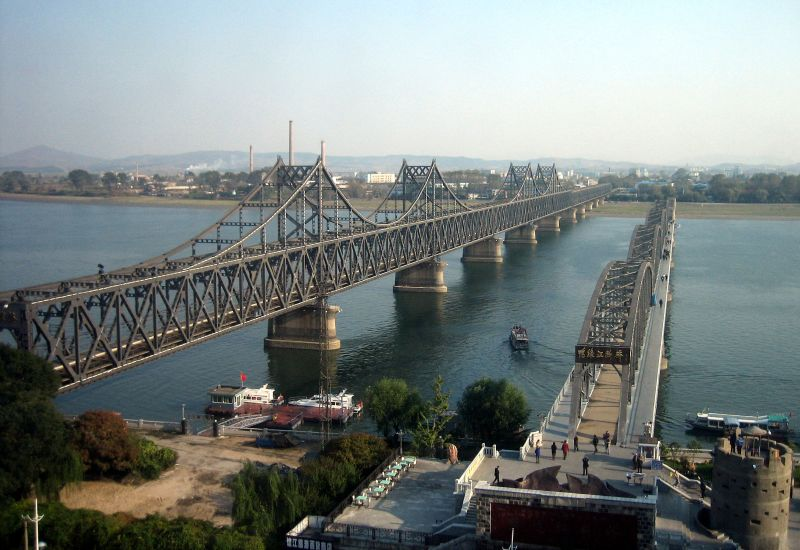
Sino–Korean Friendship Bridge

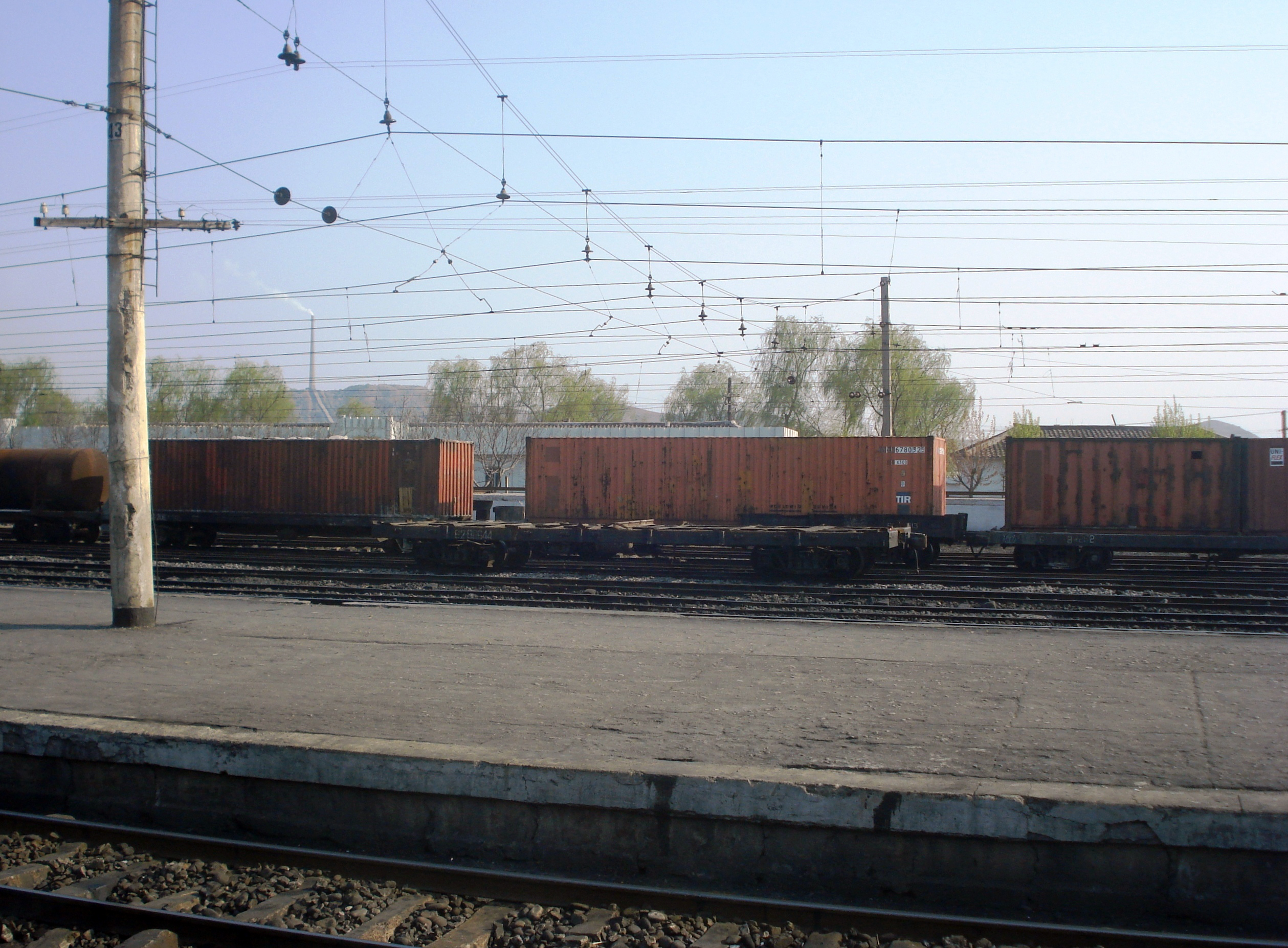
Railway electrification

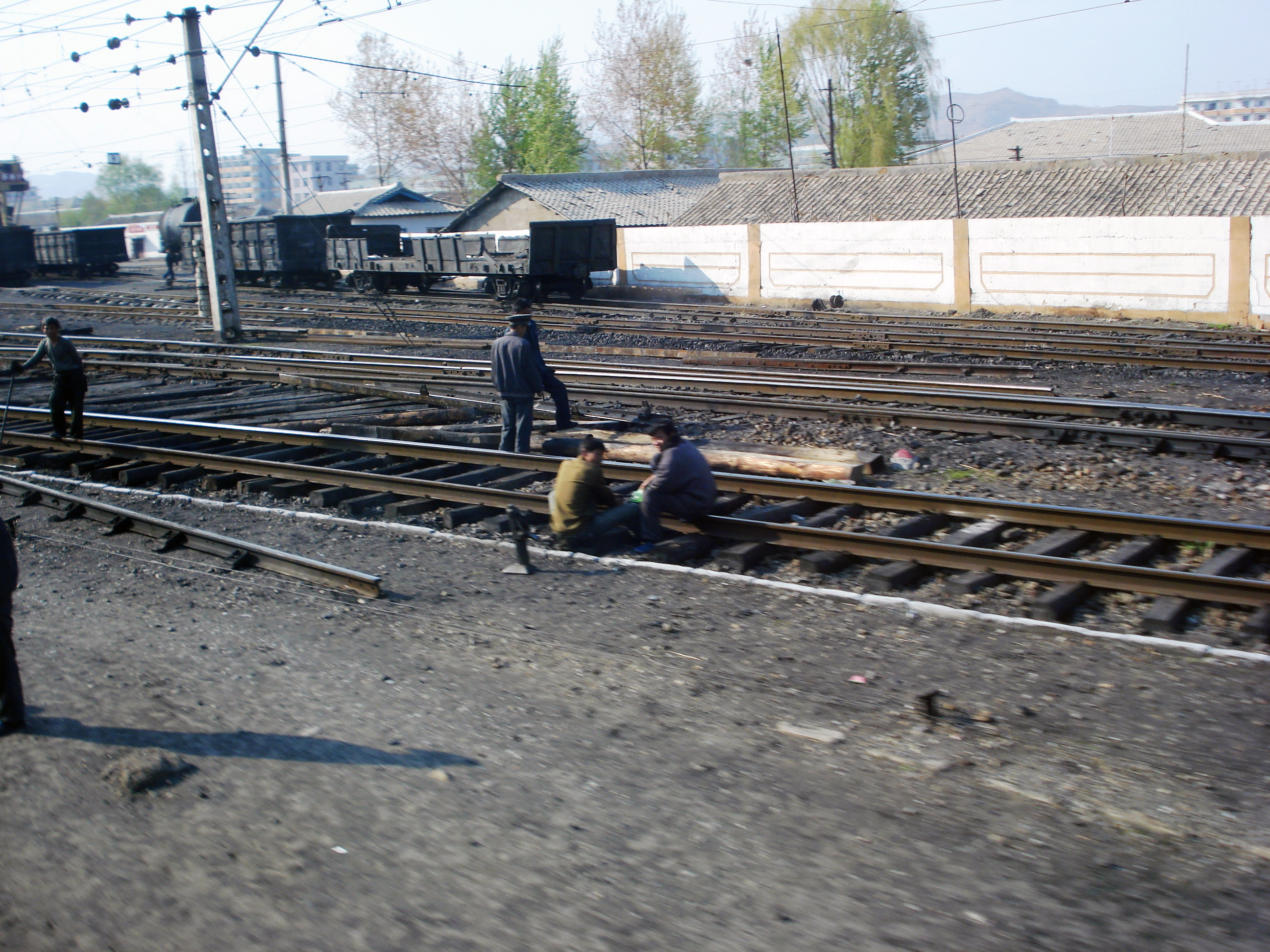
Maintenance works

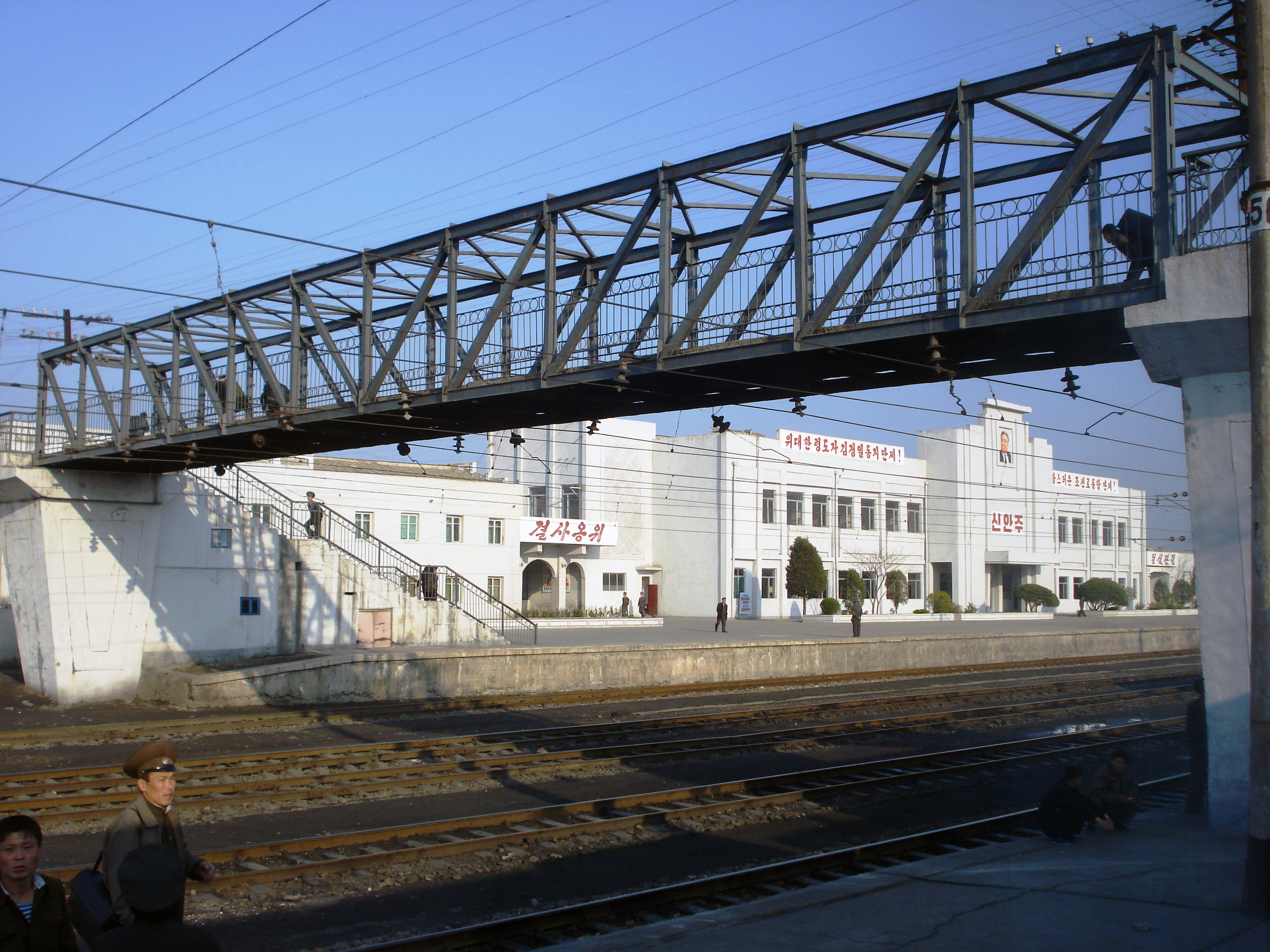
Sinanju station building

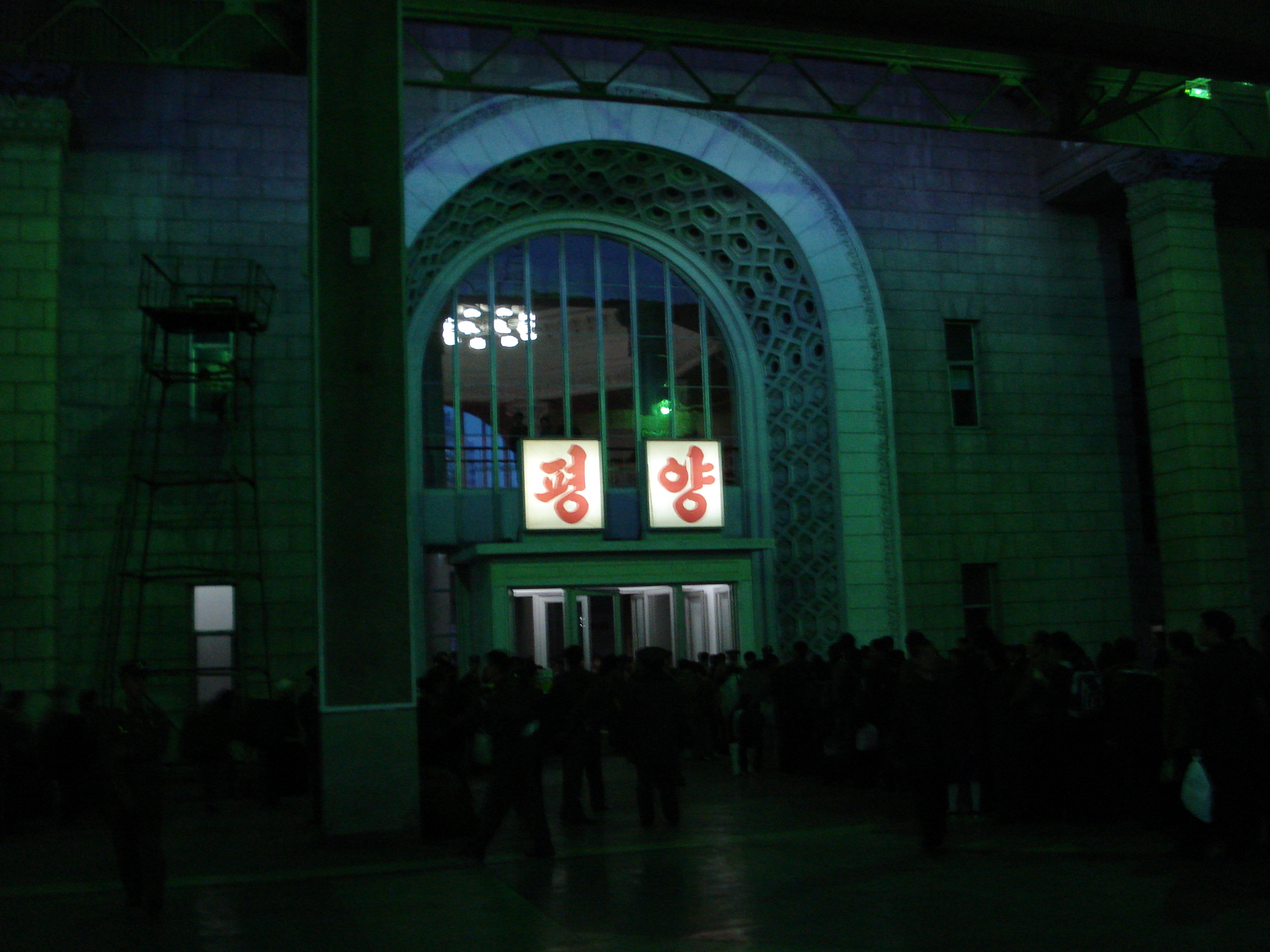
Pyongyang station at night

== History ==
Much of the rail network in Korea was built during the period of Japanese rule, which ended in 1945. There were 2,792 km (1,735 mi) of railway in 1925. Much was damaged or destroyed during the Korean War.

== See also ==
- Rail transport in South Korea
- Transport in North Korea
