= List of railway stations in South Korea =

Railway station in South Korea

The links below contain all of the railway stations in South Korea: List of railway stations in South Korea

| A | B | C | D | E | F | G | H | I | J | K | M | N | O | P | R | S | T | U | W | Y | Z |

== See also ==
- List of railway lines in South Korea
- Rail transport in South Korea
