= KTX Family Card =

Korail membership card

KTX Family Card (Korean: 코레일 멤버십 카드) is the loyalty program and membership card of Korail. This card is issued by Korail Networks, subsidiary of Korail.

== History ==
In the 1980s, the National Railroad Administration started to issue Railroad Membership Cards. This membership card only had a 10-digit membership number on it, this type of card is widely used until 1998. In 1998, quick-ticket machines and a new membership card with a magnetic strip were introduced. Although the quick-ticket machine had many benefits, the machine and new card were not widely used. The current version of KTX Family Card with IC chip (Smart card) was introduced in 2004.

== Benefits ==
- 5% mileage for the money spent on rail ticket
- Mybi·T-money transportation card service (X-cash, a part of KS transportation card system. All Mybi area and Seoul Subway, Buses, AREX accepts this card.)
- e-ticket service (X-ticket, 1% discount)
- ‘SMS Ticket’ service (1% discount)
- self-printing ‘Home Ticket’ service (1% discount)
- ticket home delivery service
- free admission for the Railroad Museum of Korea, and KTX Family Lounge in selected station

== See also ==
- Korail
- KTX
- Rail+
