= Trans-Korean Main Line =

Railway line project in North Korea and South Korea

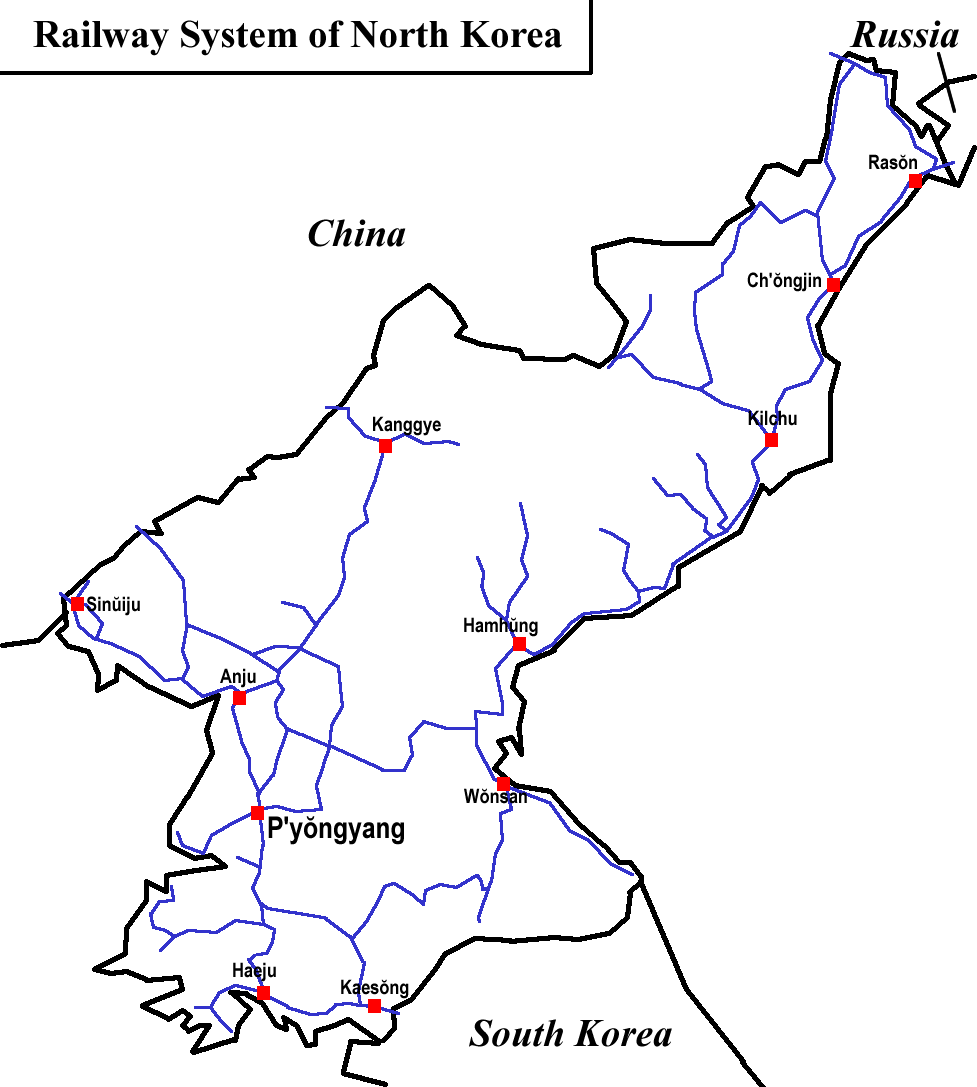
Map of existing railway infrastructure in North Korea

The Trans-Korean Main Line is a project to build railway infrastructure in North Korea, and allow rail freight to travel between South Korea and Russia; it is hoped to halve the time taken to transport freight from eastern Asia to Europe and earn substantial transit fees.

In 2001, the leaders of Russia and North Korea signed agreements to construct a rail corridor.

== Construction ==
In 2008, reconstruction work began on a 54 km cross-border rail link between Khasan in Russia, and the port of Rasŏn, via Tumangang both in North Korea; Russian Railways sees this as a first step in construction of a trans-Korean main line. Initially freight is expected to be forwarded by sea from South Korea's second city Busan to Rasŏn; there are also plans to reconstruct a line from Rasŏn to the Chinese border. Further plans are to extend the line along the east coast of the Korean peninsula, across the North/South Korean border to Busan. A line between Onjong-ri and Jojin would be rebuilt.

== See also ==
- Sino–Korean Friendship Bridge
- Rail transport in South Korea
- Rail transport in North Korea
