= SR Corporation =

Operator of Super Rapid Train (SRT) high-speed rail service in South Korea

- Formerly: Suseo High Speed Rail Corporation
- Industry: Rail transport
- Founded: 27 December 2013; 12 years ago
- Defunct: 1 September 2026
- Headquarters: Heerim Building, 12 Gwangpyeong-ro 56-gil, Gangnam District, Seoul
- Services: Super Rapid Train (SRT)
- Owners: Shareholders: Ministry of Land, Infrastructure and Transport (58.95%); Korail (41.05%)
- Parent: Korail
- Website: srail.or.kr etk.srail.kr

SR Corporation (Korean: 에스알, formerly Suseo High Speed Rail Corporation), also known as Supreme Railways, was a South Korean rail operator that operated high-speed rail services.

The company was established in December 2013 and adopted its current name in June 2014. In December 2016, SR Corporation officially launched its SRT (Super Rapid Train) services on an open-access basis. By January 2021, the company's services called at 17 stations, three of which it managed directly. The merger of SR Corporation and the national passenger operator Korail was repeatedly mooted, until the two organisations finally merged in September 2026.

== History ==
SR Logo (2014~2024)

The organisation was originally established as the Suseo High Speed Rail Corporation (수서고속철도주식회사, 水西高速鐵道株式會社) in December 2013. It was founded with the ambition of increasing competition in the South Korean railway sector and end the monopoly on Korean passenger operations by the national passenger operator incumbent Korail. During June 2014, it was announced that the company name would be changed to SR Corporation; one month later, it joined the Korea Railway Association.

In December 2016, SR Corporation officially launched SRT (Super Rapid Train) services, initially running between Suseo–Busan on a newly-opened high speed line. Being an open-access operator, it was charged more for track access by the Korea Rail Network Authority than those imposed on Korail's KTX services, paying 50 percent of its sales revenue against the KTX's 34 percent. SR Corporation has claimed that its presence has increased competition, driving down ticket prices and raising service quality overall, while also contributing to repay the accumulated debts from the construction of Korea’s high-speed network.

Throughout SR Corporation's existence multiple proposals have been mooted for merging it with Korail. In 2017, a taskforce organised by the Ministry of Land, Infrastructure and Transport reviewed one such merger initiative; the terms of the envisioned merger were publicly opposed by SR's trade union. During December 2018, the South Korean government announced the revival of plans to combine the two entities.

In December 2022, it was announced that the planned merger between SR Corporation and Korail, a move that the latter had strongly advocated for, had been abandoned. During January 2023, Lee Jong-guk, SR’s newly appointed CEO, announced that the company would be pursuing greater independence from its majority shareholder, Korail; furthermore, that a comprehensive review of all existing contracts would be conducted. Specific areas of independence include a planned expansion of internal maintenance of rolling stock, including component production.

A later attempt to merge SR Corporation and Korail succeeded, with the Fair Trade Commission approving the merger in August 2026 and the merger taking place on 1st September 2026.

== Services ==
The Super Rapid Train (SRT) was a high-speed rail service operated by SR Corporation; it was launched on 9 December 2016. By January 2021, the service consisted of two routes, Suseo–Busan and Suseo–Mokpo. For 2020, SR Corporation achieved a market share of 29 percent upon these two routes against the incumbent KTX service. Ticket prices have typically been cheaper than KTX equivalents, the average price being around 10% cheaper in late 2016. The SRT runs the Seoul-Busan route eight minutes faster than KTX. In August 2019, amid a souring of trade relations between South Korea and Japan, SR Corporation announced that it would replace all Japanese components present in its rolling stock with locally-produced counterparts; efforts are being made to reduce reliance on other exporters such as Germany and the Netherlands.
