= Gijang station =

Train station in South Korea

기장
Gijang
기장; Gijang
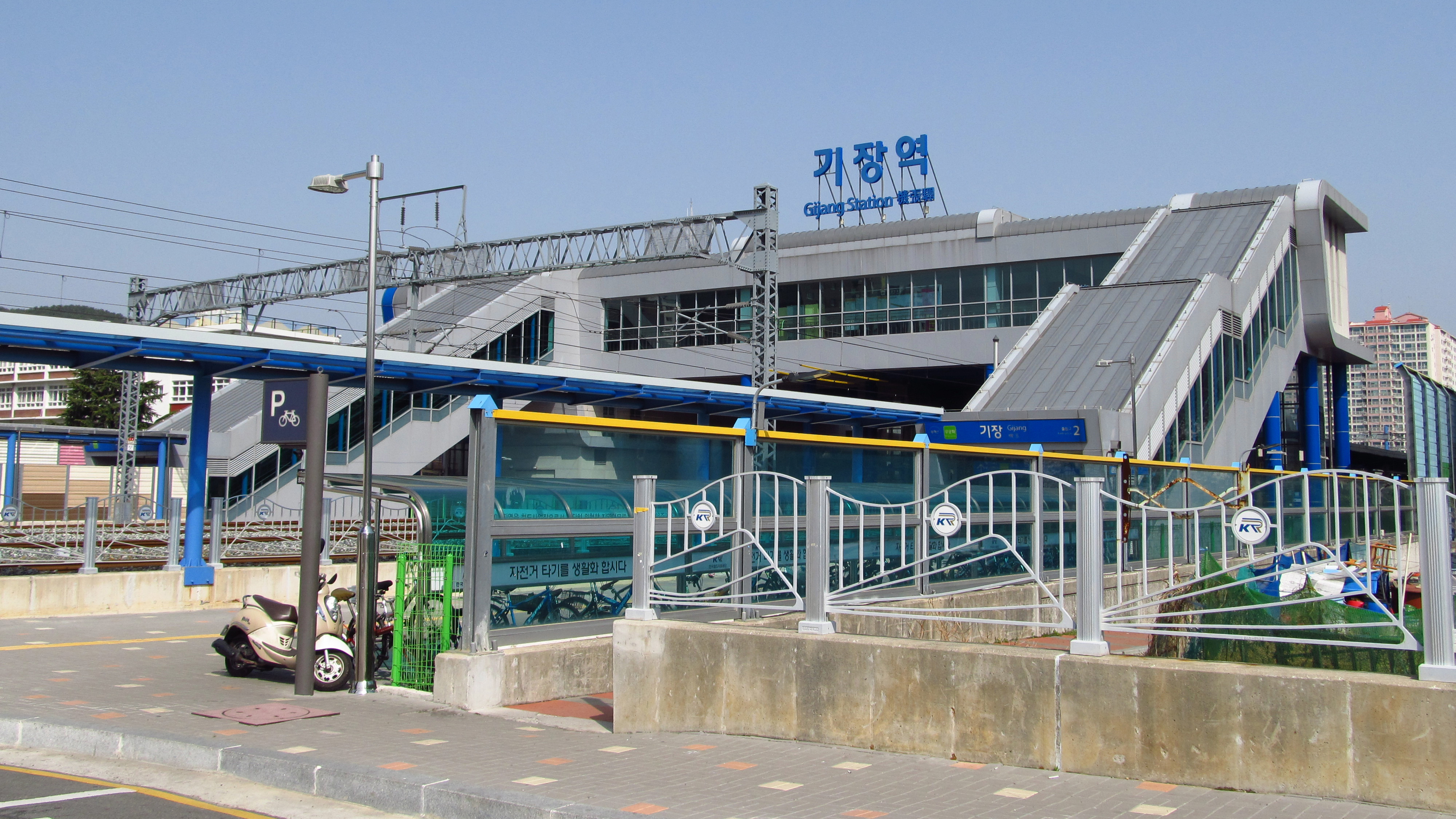
- Gijang station in 2018

Korean name
- Hangul: 기장역
- Hanja: 機張驛
- Revised Romanization: Gijangyeok
- McCune–Reischauer: Kijangyŏk

General information
- Location: 86 Chaseong-ro 288beon-gil, Gijang-eup, Gijang County, Busan; South Korea
- Coordinates: 35.2429°N 129.2185°E
- Operator: Korail
- Line: Donghae Line
- Platforms: 2
- Tracks: 4

Construction
- Structure type: Aboveground

History
- Opened: December 16, 1934

Services
Preceding station	Busan Metro	Following station
OSIRIA towards Bujeon	Donghae Line	Ilgwang towards Taehwagang
Regional services
Preceding station	Korea Train Express	Following station
Namchang towards Seoul	Jungang KTX	Sinhaeundae towards Bujeon
Preceding station	Korail	Following station
Namchang towards Cheongnyangni	ITX-Maum Jungang Line	Sinhaeundae towards Bujeon
Namchang towards Dongdaegu	ITX-Maum Donghae Line	Sinhaeundae towards Bujeon
Namchang towards Gangneung	ITX-Maum Donghae Line	Sinhaeundae towards Bujeon
Namchang towards Pohang	Mugunghwa-ho Donghae Line	Sinhaeundae towards Bujeon
Namchang towards Dongdaegu	Mugunghwa-ho Donghae Line	Sinhaeundae towards Bujeon
Location

Gijang station (Korean: 기장역) is a railway station of the Donghae Line in Gijang-eup, Gijang County, Busan, South Korea.

== Station layout ==
L2; Platforms	Northbound	Mugunghwa-ho toward Dongdaegu or Pohang (Namchang) →
L2; Platforms	Island platform, doors will open on the left and right
L2; Platforms	Northbound	Donghae toward Taehwagang (Ilgwang) →
L2; Platforms	Southbound	← Donghae toward Bujeon (OSIRIA)
L2; Platforms	Island platform, doors will open on the left and right
L2; Platforms	Southbound	← Mugunghwa-ho toward Bujeon (Sinhaeundae)

L1; Concourse	Lobby	Customer service, shops, vending machines, ATMs

G	Street level	Exit

== Gallery ==
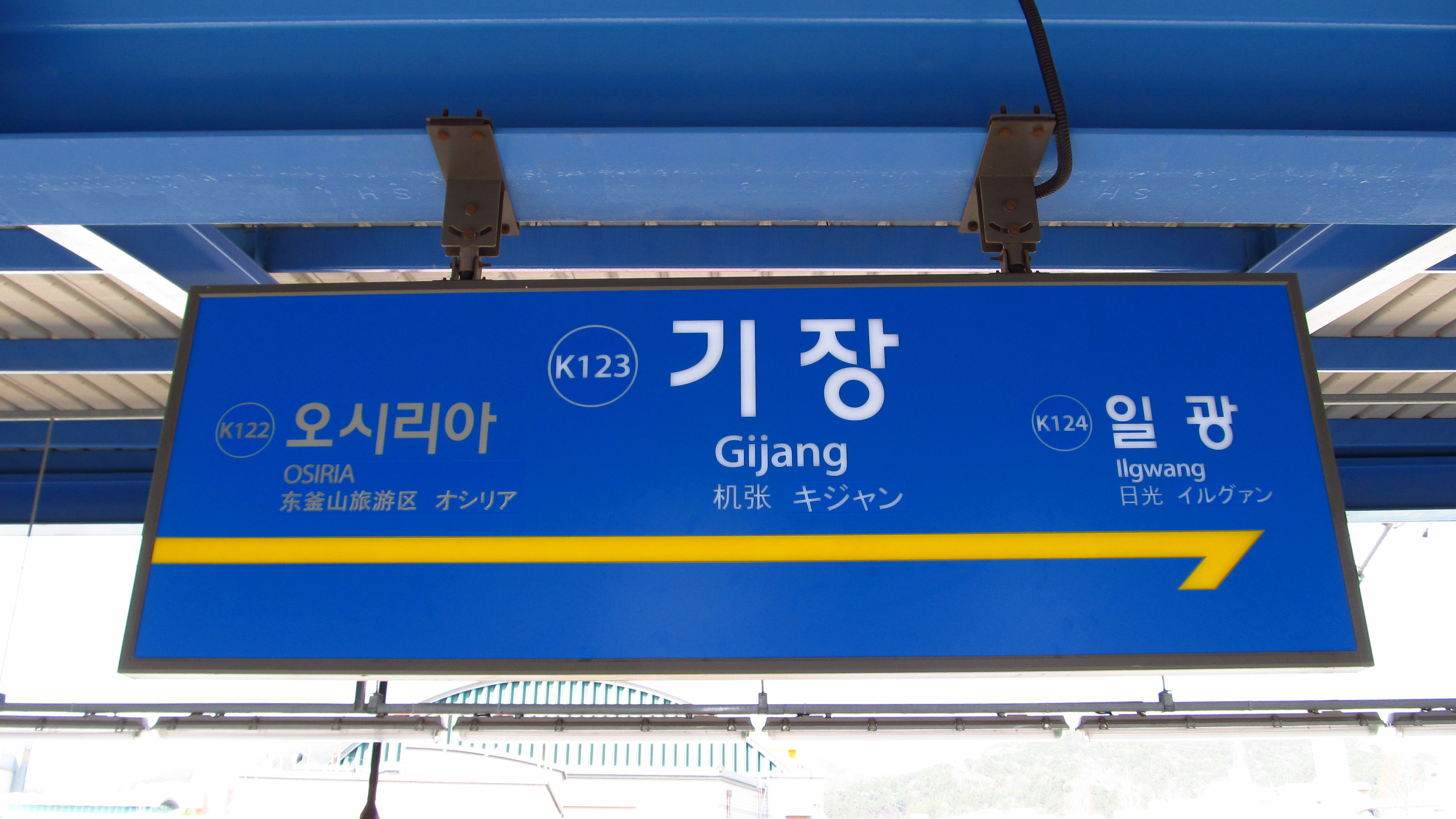
Station sign

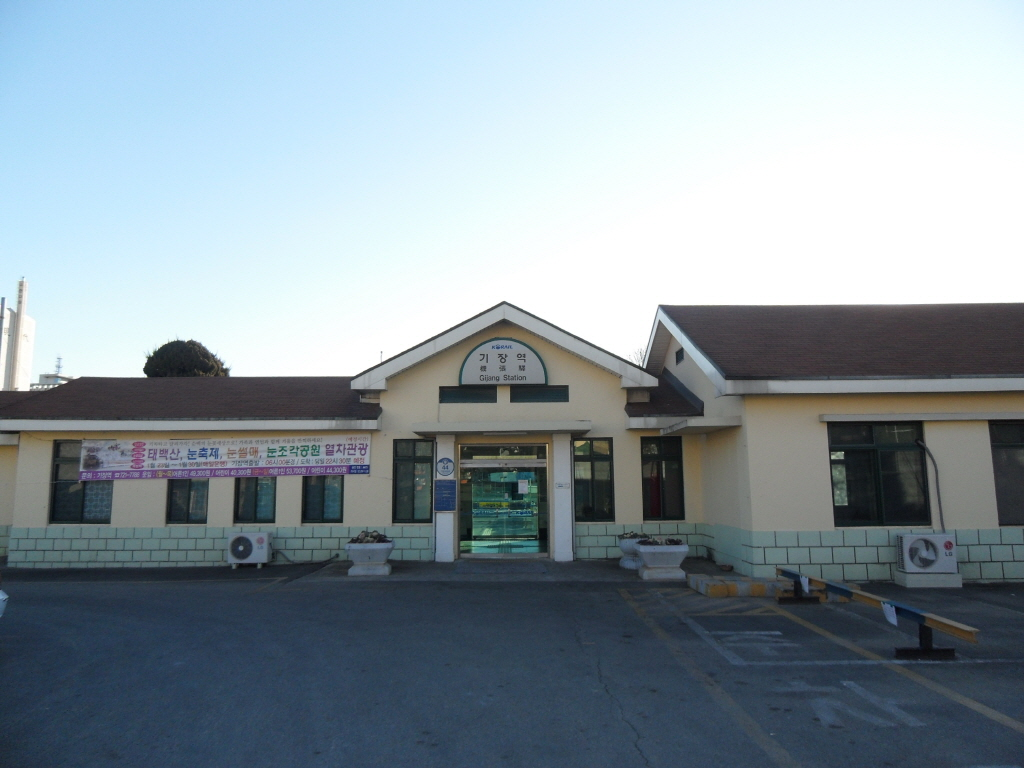
Former Gijang station
- Media related to Gijang Station at Wikimedia Commons
