= Ilgwang station =

Train station in South Korea

일광; Ilgwang
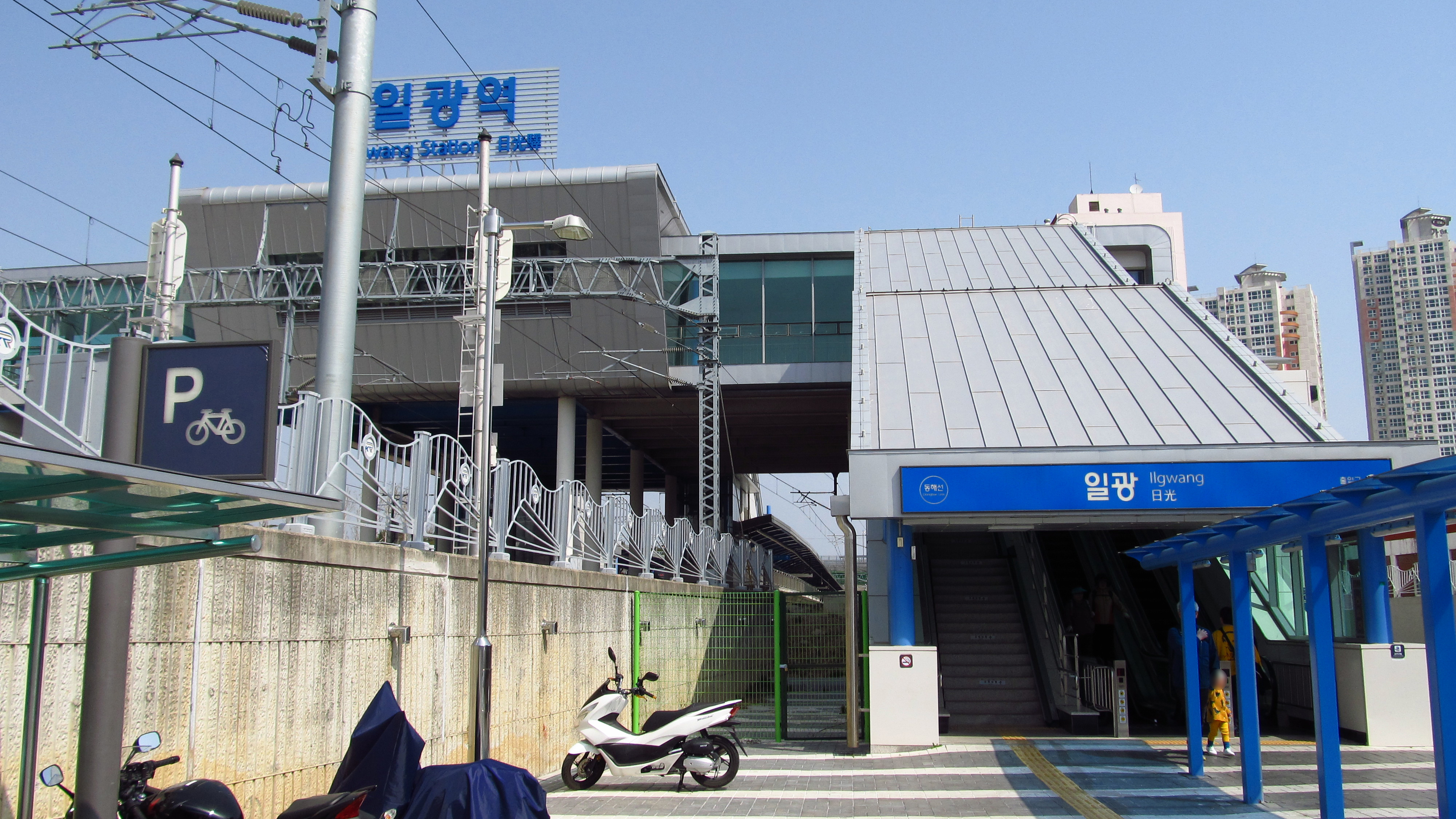
- Ilgwang Station in 2018

Korean name
- Hangul: 일광역
- Hanja: 日光驛
- Revised Romanization: Ilgwangyeok
- McCune–Reischauer: Ilgwangyŏk

General information
- Location: 111-10 Ilgwang-ro, Ilgwang-myeon, Gijang County, Busan; South Korea
- Coordinates: 35°16′00″N 129°13′58″E
- Operator: Korail
- Line: Donghae Line
- Platforms: 2
- Tracks: 4

Construction
- Structure type: Aboveground
- Parking: Yes
- Cycle facilities: Yes

History
- Opened: December 16, 1934

Services
Preceding station	Busan Metro	Following station
Gijang towards Bujeon	Donghae Line	Jwacheon towards Taehwagang
Location

Ilgwang Station (Korean: 일광역) is a railway station of the Donghae Line in Ilgwang-myeon, Gijang County, Busan, South Korea.

== Station Layout ==
L2; Platforms	Side platform, doors will open on the left
L2; Platforms	Northbound	Donghae toward Taehwagang (Jwacheon) →
L2; Platforms	Southbound	← Donghae toward Bujeon (Gijang)
L2; Platforms	Side platform, doors will open on the left

L1; Concourse	Lobby	Customer Service, Shops, Vending machines, ATMs

G	Street level	Exit
