= Wollae station =

Train station in South Korea

월내; Wollae
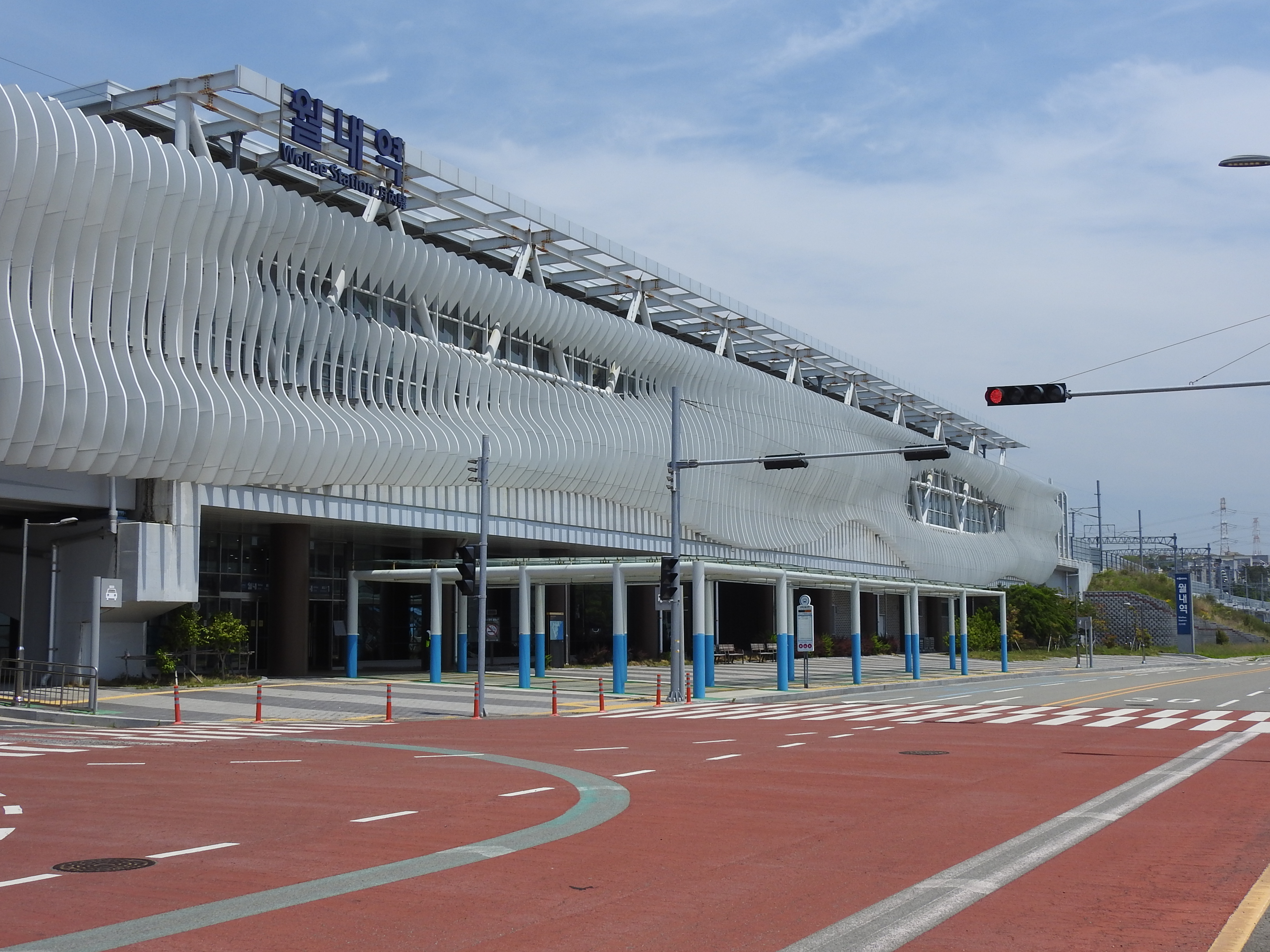
- New station building

Korean name
- Hangul: 월내역
- Hanja: 月內驛
- Revised Romanization: Wollaeyeok
- McCune–Reischauer: Wŏllaeyŏk

General information
- Location: 351-31 Haemaji-ro, Jangan-eup, Gijang County, Busan; South Korea
- Coordinates: 35.3262°N 129.2755°E
- Operator: Korail
- Line: Donghae Line
- Platforms: 2
- Tracks: 4

Construction
- Structure type: Aboveground

History
- Opened: December 16, 1935

Services
Preceding station	Busan Metro	Following station
Jwacheon towards Bujeon	Donghae Line	Seosaeng towards Taehwagang
Location

Wollae Station (Korean: 월내역; Hanja: 月內驛) is a railway station of the Donghae Line in Jangan-eup, Gijang County, Busan, South Korea.
