= Yeongcheon station =

Railway station

영천
Yeongcheon
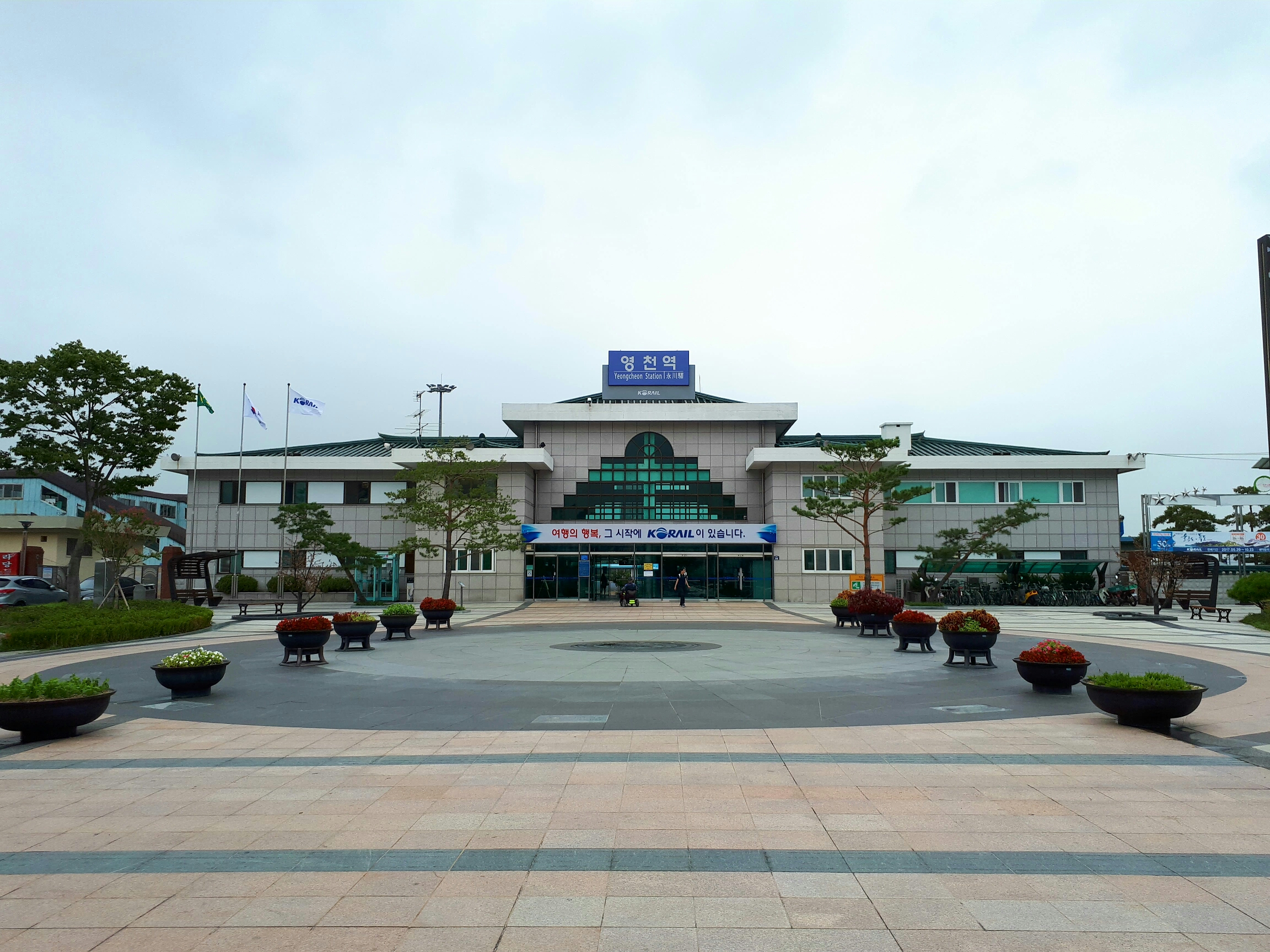

Korean name
- Hangul: 영천역
- Hanja: 永川驛
- Revised Romanization: Yeongcheonnyeok
- McCune–Reischauer: Yŏngch'ŏnnyŏk

General information
- Location: Wansan-dong, Yeongcheon, North Gyeongsang; South Korea
- Coordinates: 35°57′34″N 128°56′21″E
- Operator: Korail
- Lines: Jungang Line, Daegu Line

Construction
- Structure type: Aboveground

History
- Opened: November 1, 1918

Services
| Preceding station | Korea Train Express | Following station |
|---|---|---|
| Uiseong towards Seoul | Jungang KTX | Gyeongju towards Bujeon |
| Preceding station | Korail | Following station |
| Gunwi towards Cheongnyangni | ITX-Maum Jungang Line | Ahwa towards Bujeon |
| Hayang towards Dongdaegu | Mugunghwa-ho Donghae Line | Ahwa towards Pohang |
| Hayang towards Dongdaegu | Mugunghwa-ho Donghae Line | Gyeongju towards Bujeon |
| Hayang towards Dongdaegu | Nuriro Donghae Line | Ahwa towards Gangneung |
| Hayang towards Dongdaegu | Nuriro Donghae Line | Ahwa towards Taehwagang |
Location

Yeongcheon station is a railway station in the city of Yeongcheon, North Gyeongsang Province, South Korea. It is on the Jungang Line and the Daegu Line.
