= Mangyang station =

Railway station in South Korea

망양; Mangyang
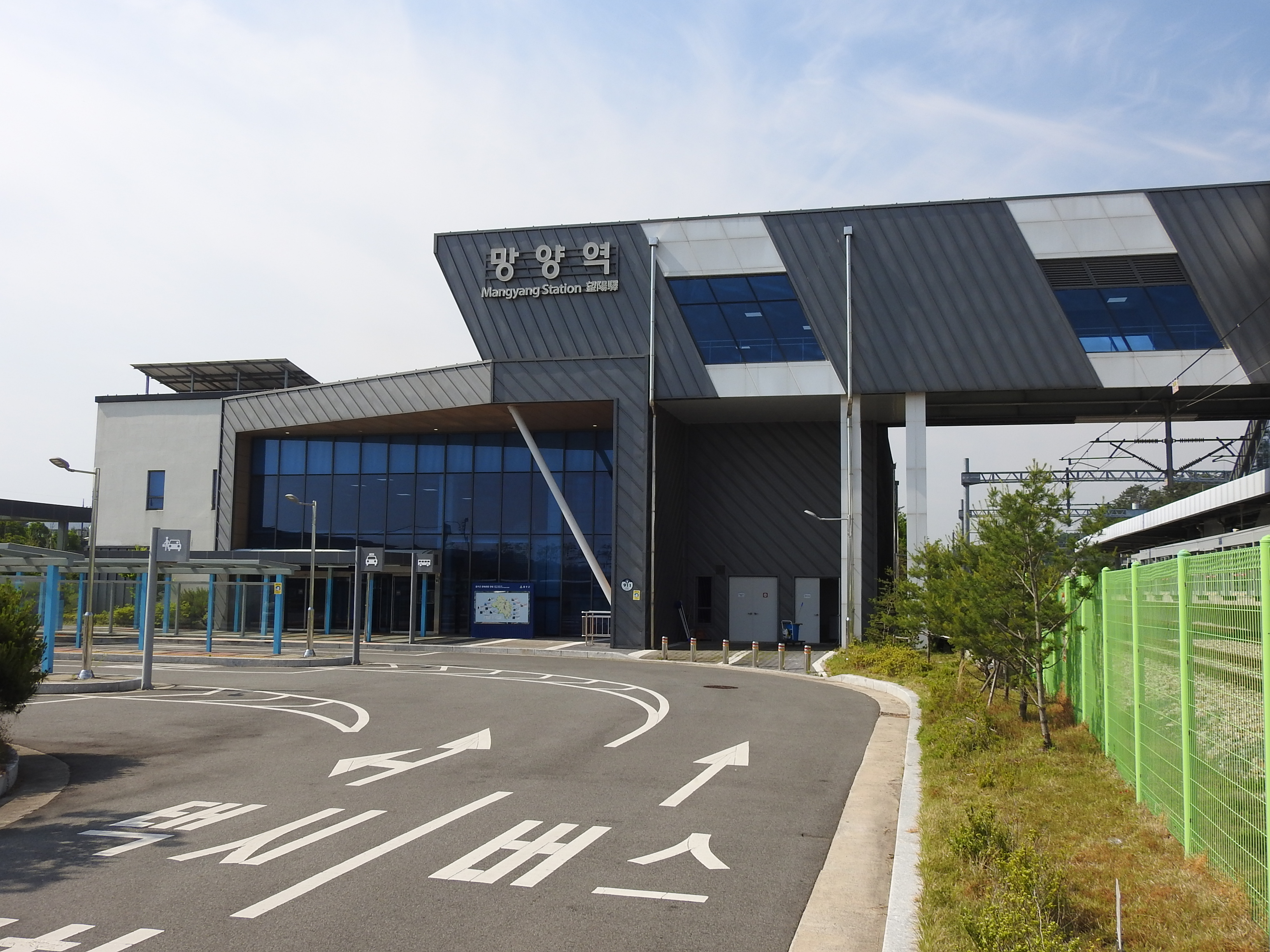
- New station office

Korean name
- Hangul: 망양역
- Hanja: 望陽驛
- Revised Romanization: Mangyangyeok
- McCune–Reischauer: Mangyangyŏk

General information
- Location: 911 Namchang-ro, Onyang-eup, Ulju County, Ulsan; South Korea
- Coordinates: 35.4563°N 129.2882°E
- Operator: Korail
- Line: Donghae Line
- Platforms: 2
- Tracks: 4

Construction
- Structure type: Aboveground

History
- Opened: December 26, 2021

Services
Preceding station	Busan Metro	Following station
Namchang towards Bujeon	Donghae Line	Deokha towards Taehwagang
Location

Mangyang Station (Korean: 망양역; Hanja: 望陽驛) is a railway station of the Donghae Line in Onyang-eup Ulju County, Ulsan, South Korea.
