= Deokha station =

Railway station in South Korea

| 덕하; Deokha |
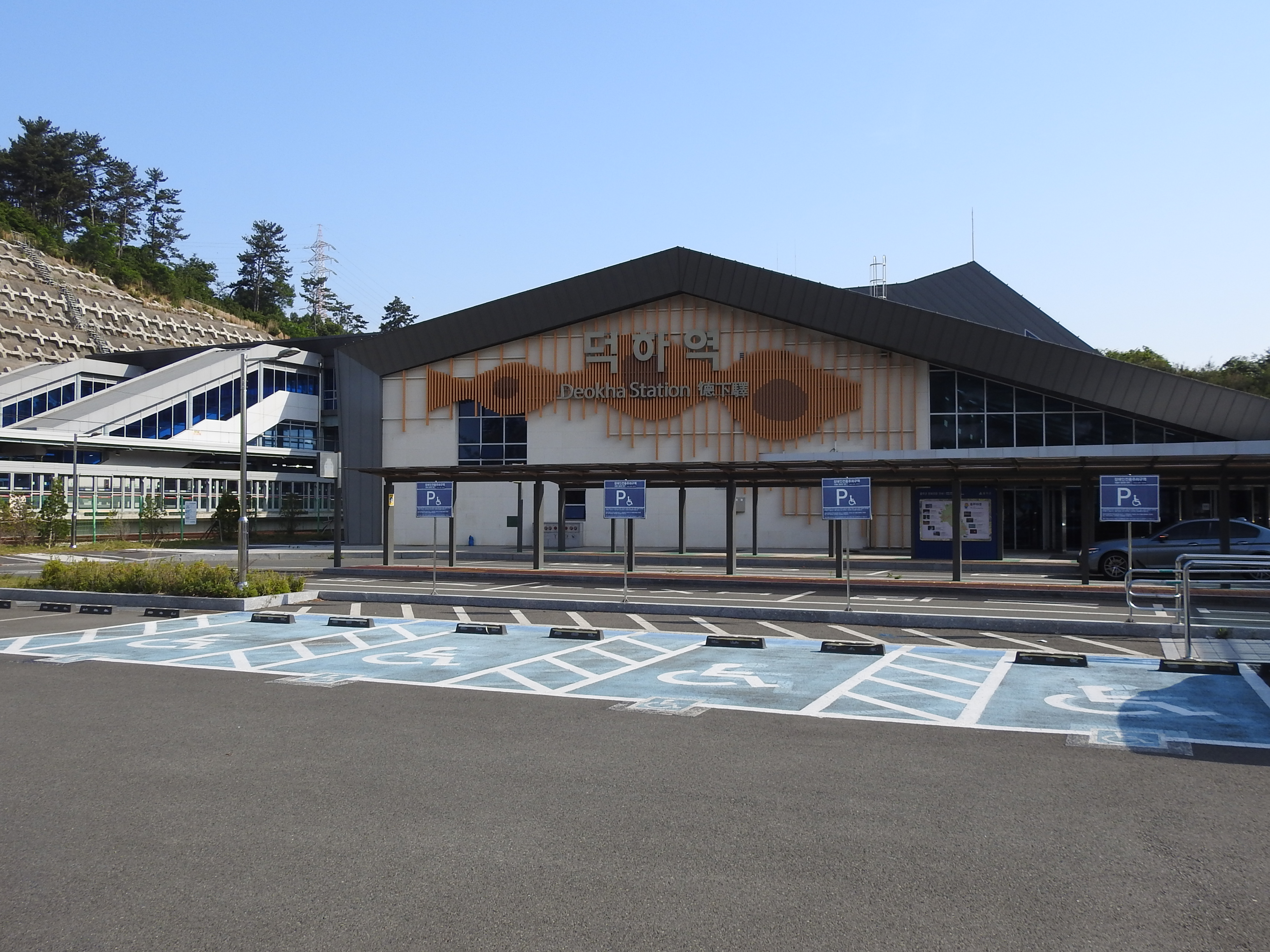
- New station building

Korean name
- Hangul: 덕하역
- Hanja: 德下驛
- Revised Romanization: Deokayeok
- McCune–Reischauer: Tŏk'ayŏk

General information
- Location: 229 Deokha-ro, Cheongnyang-eup, Ulju County, Ulsan; South Korea
- Coordinates: 35.4938°N 129.3035°E
- Operator: Korail
- Line: Donghae Line
- Platforms: 2
- Tracks: 4

Construction
- Structure type: Aboveground

History
- Opened: December 16, 1935

Services
| Preceding station | Busan Metro | Following station |
|---|---|---|
| Mangyang towards Bujeon | Donghae Line | Gaeunpo towards Taehwagang |
Location

Deokha Station (Korean: 덕하역; Hanja: 德下驛) is a railway station of the Donghae Line in Cheongnyang-eup Ulju County, Ulsan, South Korea.
