= Jwacheon station =

Jwacheon station (Korean: 좌천역; Hanja: 佐川驛) is the name of two railroad stations in Busan, South Korea.

- Jwacheon station (Korail)
- Jwacheon station (Busan Metro)
