= Jwacheon station (Korail) =

Railway station in Busan, South Korea

Coordinates: 35°18′43″N 129°14′42″E

좌천 (원자력의학원); Jwacheon (DIRAMS Cancer Center)
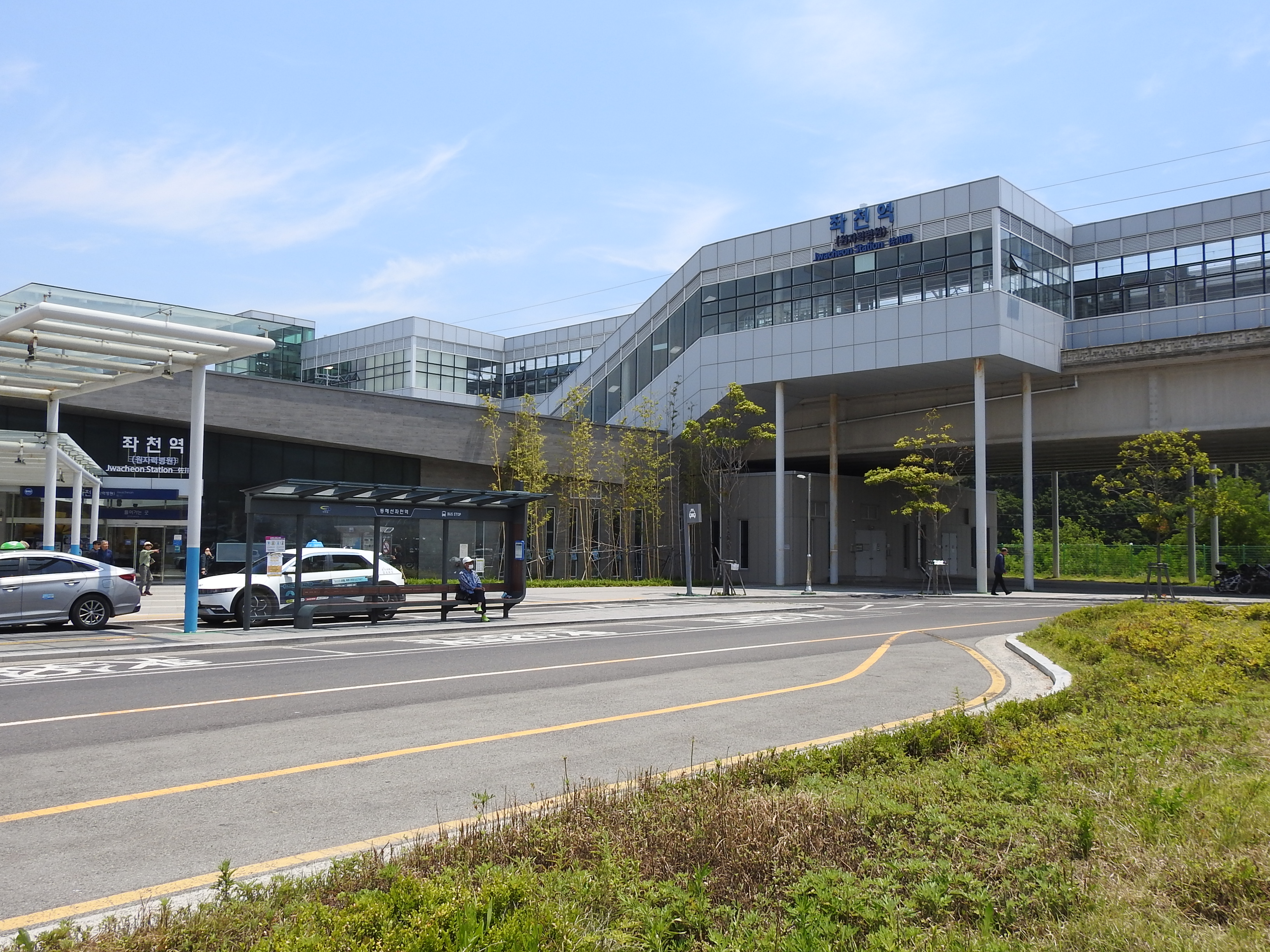
- New station building

Korean name
- Hangul: 좌천역
- Hanja: 佐川驛
- Revised Romanization: Jwacheonyeok
- McCune–Reischauer: Chwach'ŏnyŏk

General information
- Location: 2 Haemaji-ro, Jangan-eup, Gijang County, Busan; South Korea
- Operator: Korail
- Line: Donghae Line
- Platforms: 2
- Tracks: 2

Construction
- Structure type: Aboveground

History
- Opened: December 16, 1934

Services
Preceding station	Busan Metro	Following station
Ilgwang towards Bujeon	Donghae Line	Wollae towards Taehwagang
Location

Jwacheon Station (Korean: 좌천역; Hanja: 佐川驛) is a railway station of the Donghae Line in Jangan-eup, Gijang County, Busan, South Korea. The station is unrelated to the station of the same name of Busan Metro.
