= Seosaeng station =

Train station in South Korea

서생 (간절곶); Seosaeng (Ganjeolgot)
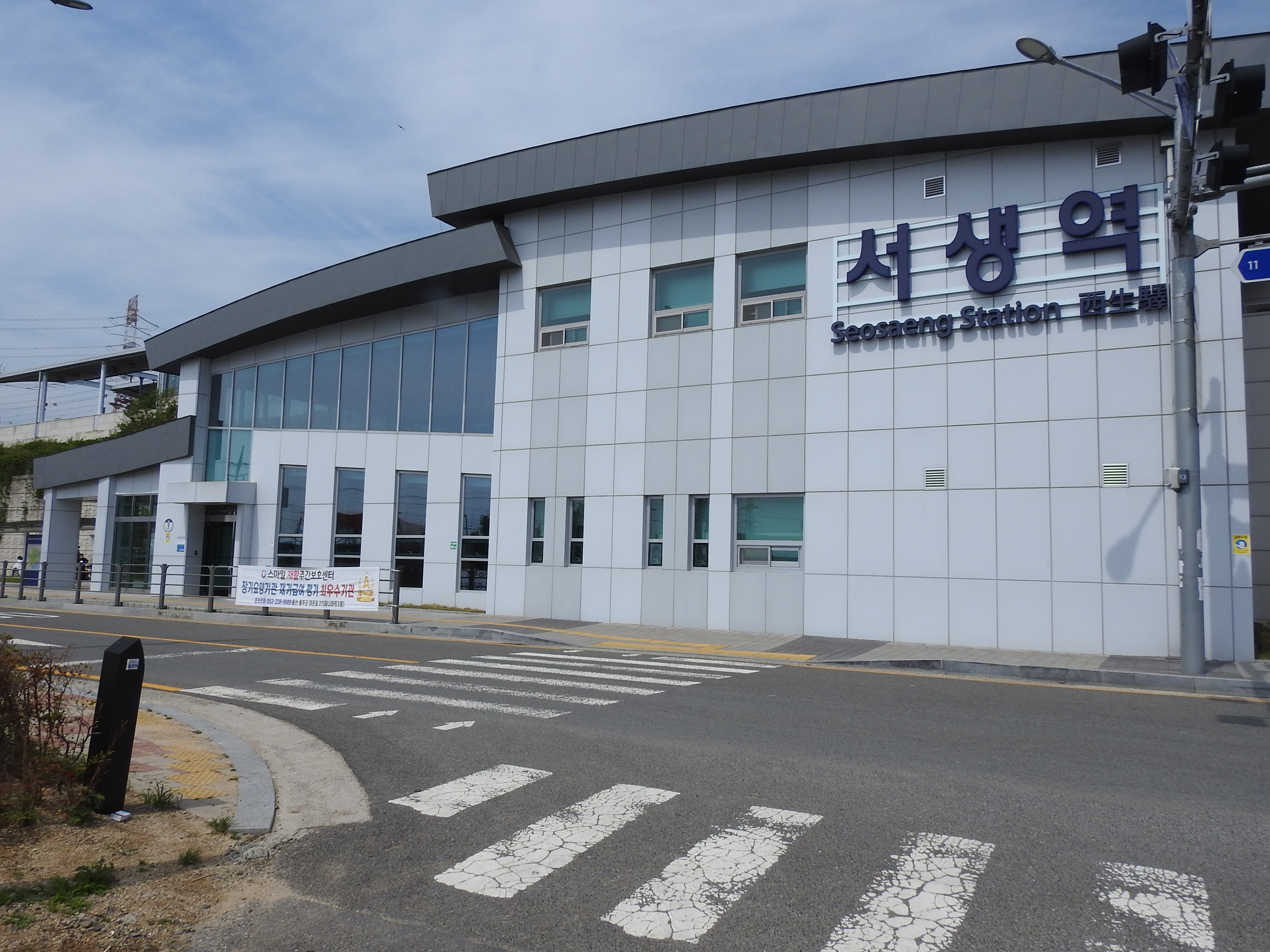
- New station office

Korean name
- Hangul: 서생역
- Hanja: 西生驛
- Revised Romanization: Seosaengyeok
- McCune–Reischauer: Sŏsaengyŏk

General information
- Location: 1 Hwasanballi-ro, Seosang-myeon, Ulju County, Ulsan; South Korea
- Coordinates: 35.3462°N 129.2933°E
- Operator: Korail
- Line: Donghae Line
- Platforms: 2
- Tracks: 2

Construction
- Structure type: Aboveground

History
- Opened: November 1, 1957

Services
Preceding station	Busan Metro	Following station
Wollae towards Bujeon	Donghae Line	Namchang towards Taehwagang
Location

Seosaeng Station (Korean: 서생역; Hanja: 西生驛) is a railway station of the Donghae Line in Seosaeng-myeon Ulju County, Ulsan, South Korea.
