= Namchang station =

Railway station in Ulsan, South Korea

남창
Namchang
| 남창; Namchang |
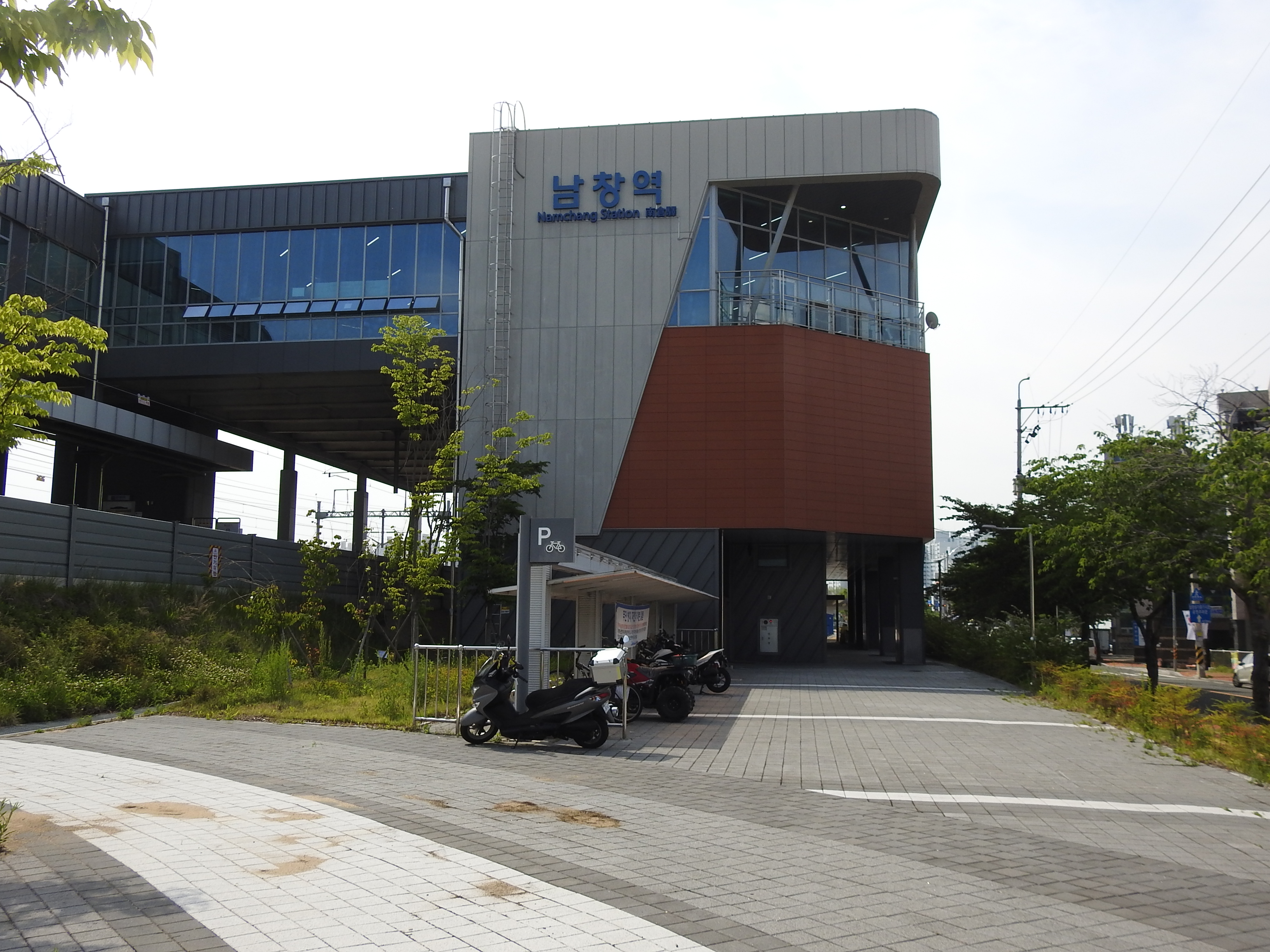
- New station building

Korean name
- Hangul: 남창역
- Hanja: 南倉驛
- Revised Romanization: Namchangyeok
- McCune–Reischauer: Namch'angyŏk

General information
- Location: 40 Namchangyeok-gil, Onyang-eup, Ulju County, Ulsan; South Korea
- Coordinates: 35.4186°N 129.2826°E
- Operator: Korail
- Line: Donghae Line
- Platforms: 2
- Tracks: 4

Construction
- Structure type: Aboveground

History
- Opened: December 16, 1935

Services
| Preceding station | Busan Metro | Following station |
|---|---|---|
| Seosaeng towards Bujeon | Donghae Line | Mangyang towards Taehwagang |
Regional services
| Preceding station | Korea Train Express | Following station |
|---|---|---|
| Taehwagang towards Seoul | Jungang KTX | Gijang towards Bujeon |
| Preceding station | Korail | Following station |
| Taehwagang towards Cheongnyangni | ITX-Maum Jungang Line | Gijang towards Bujeon |
| Taehwagang towards Dongdaegu | ITX-Maum Donghae Line | Gijang towards Bujeon |
| Taehwagang towards Gangneung | ITX-Maum Donghae Line | Gijang towards Bujeon |
| Taehwagang towards Pohang | Mugunghwa-ho Donghae Line | Gijang towards Bujeon |
| Taehwagang towards Dongdaegu | Mugunghwa-ho Donghae Line | Gijang towards Bujeon |
Location

Namchang Station (Korean: 남창역; Hanja: 南倉驛) is a railway station of the Donghae Line in Onyang-eup Ulju County, Ulsan, South Korea.
