= Korail Class 200000 =

South Korean train

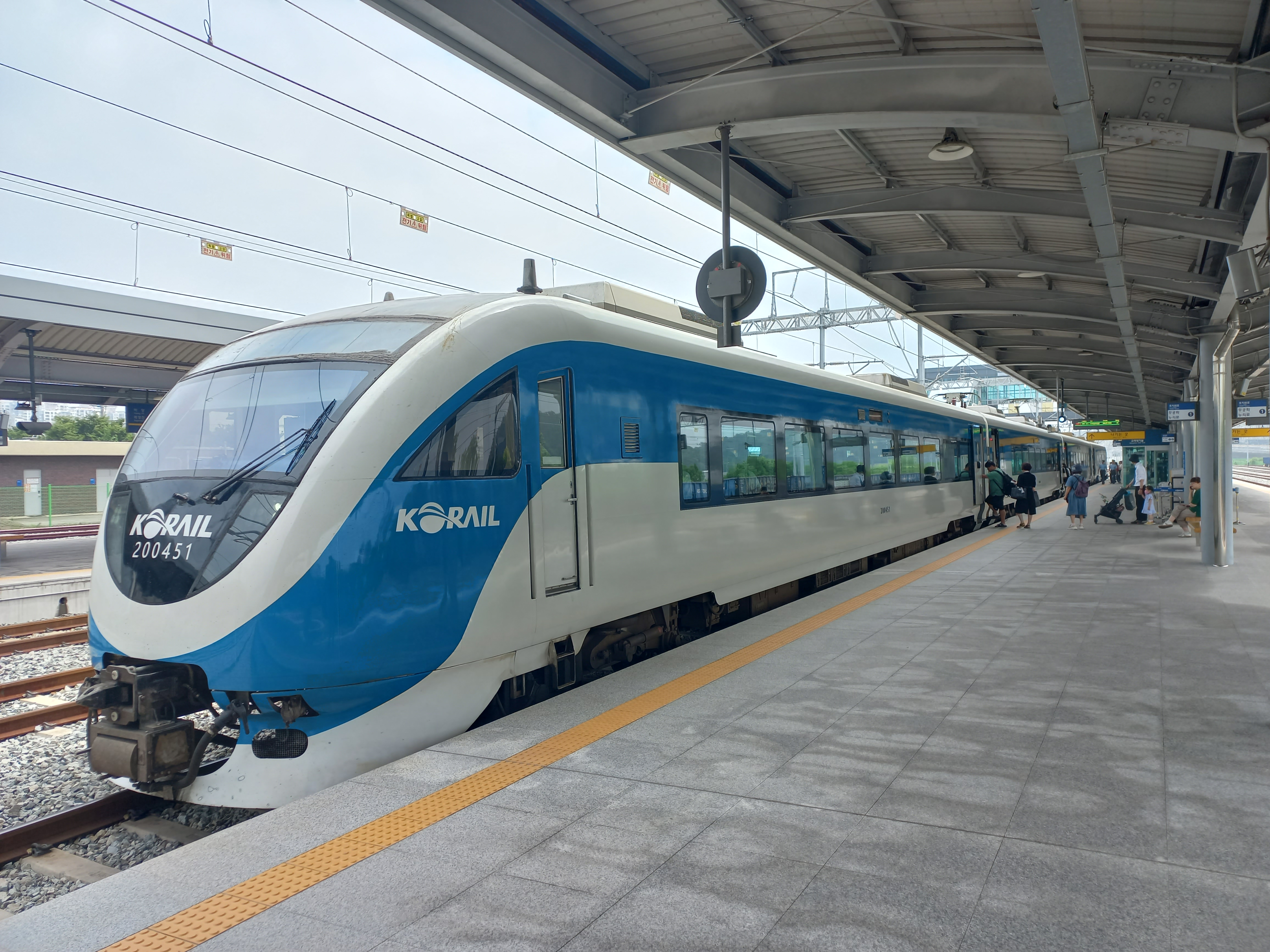
- Korail Class 200000 with revised livery in 2023
- In service: 1 June 2009; 17 years ago - present
- Manufacturer: Hitachi Rail
- Family name: A-train
- Constructed: 2006–2008
- Entered service: 2009
- Number built: 32 carriages (8 sets)
- Number in service: 28 carriages (7 sets)
- Number scrapped: 4 carriages (1 set; accident damage) (Set 2003)
- Formation: 4 cars per trainset Mc1-Tp-T-Mc2
- Fleet numbers: 2001–2008
- Capacity: 263 passengers
- Operator: Korail
- Lines served: Jungang Line; Yeongdong Line

Specifications
- Car body construction: Aluminium
- Train length: 94.0 m (308 ft 5 in)
- Car length: 23.08 m (75 ft 9 in)
- Width: 3.18 m (10 ft 5 in)
- Height: 3.75 m (12 ft 4 in)
- Maximum speed: Service: 150 km/h (93 mph); Design: 165 km/h (103 mph)
- Weight: 171 t (168 long tons; 188 short tons)
- Axle load: 12 t (12 long tons; 13 short tons)
- Traction system: 2-level IGBT–VVVF (Hitachi)
- Traction motors: 8 × 250 kW 3-phase AC induction motor (Hitachi)
- Power output: 2,000 kW (2,682 hp)
- Deceleration: from 150 to 0 km/h (93 to 0 mph) in 900 m (0.6 mi)
- Electric system: 25 kV 60 Hz AC (nominal) from overhead catenary
- Current collection: Pantograph
- Bogies: Hitachi KH-221 monolink-type bolsterless bogies with yaw dampers
- Braking systems: Regenerative, electrical and pneumatic
- Safety systems: ATP, ATS
- Coupling system: Shibata
- Track gauge: 1,435 mm (4 ft 8 1/2 in) standard gauge

The Korail Class 200000 or TEC (Trunk-line Electric Car) is a type of electric multiple unit operated by Korail for the Nuriro services.

== History ==
It was originally scheduled to deliver units in the summer of 2008 and start operation on 15 December of the same year with the extension of Line 1 of the Seoul Metropolitan Subway. Due to the 2008 financial crisis, the amount of foreign currency delivery more than doubled from the time of contract. The first train was delivered on 9 January 2009, and the trial operation began on 6 February. On 1 June 2009, the trains entered regular service .

== Gallery ==
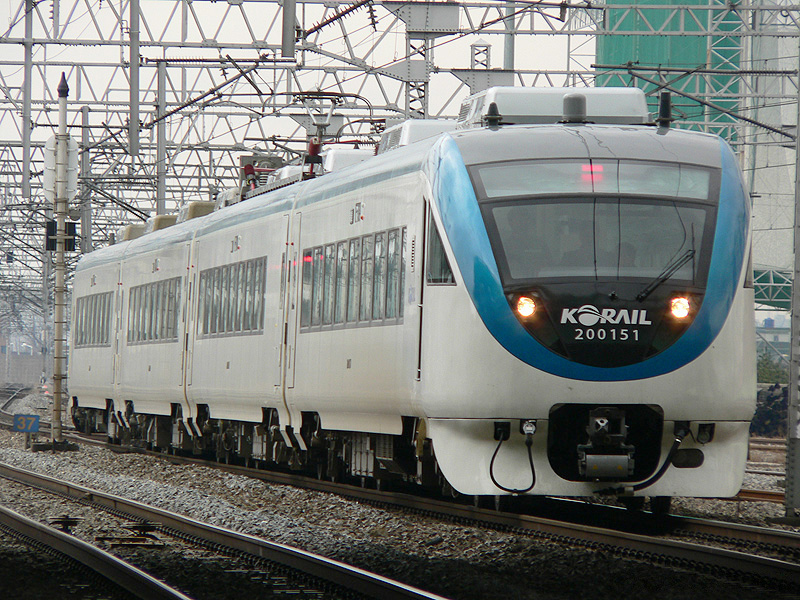
On test in 2009

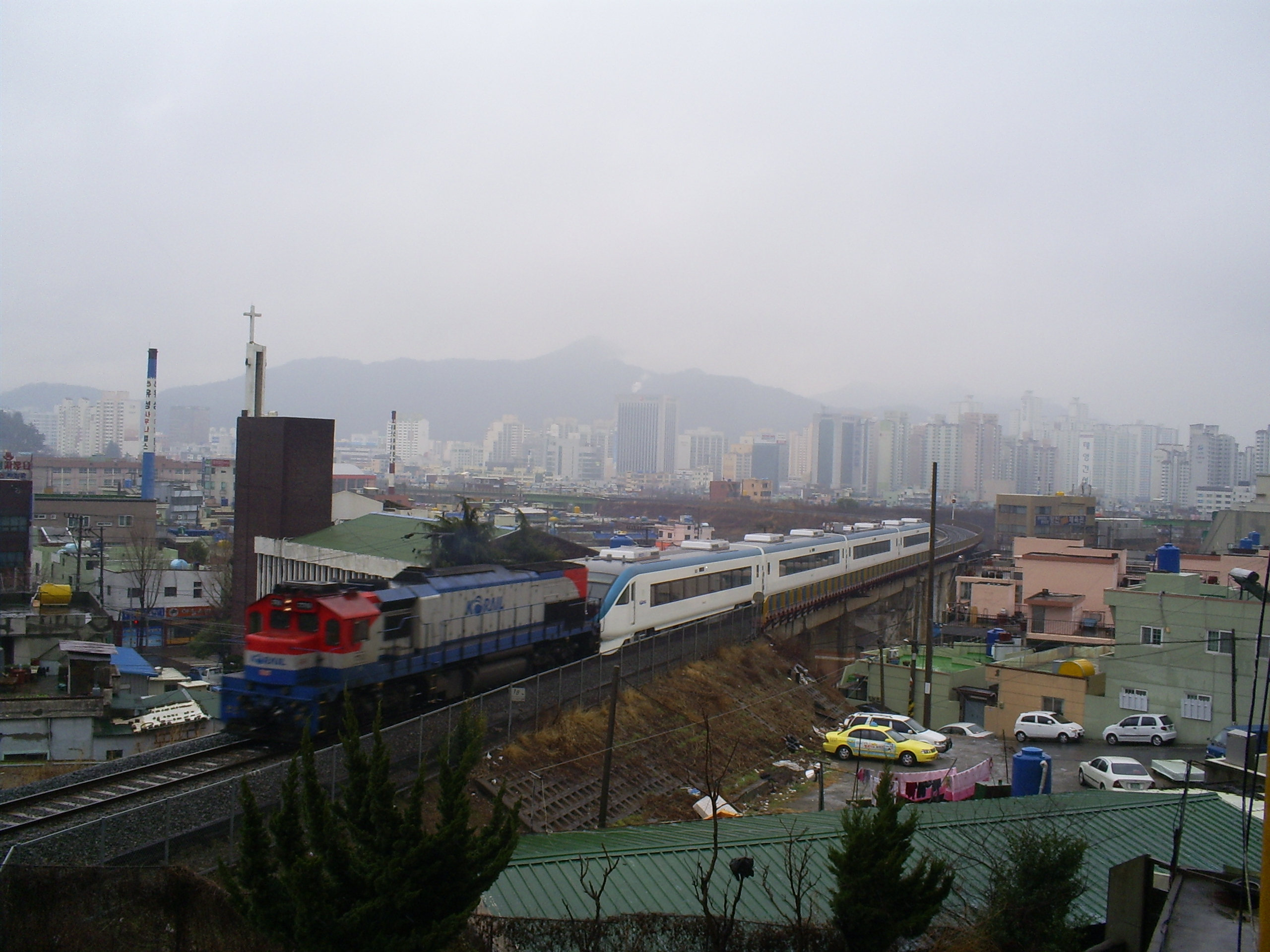
Trainsets being forwarded by locomotive in 2009

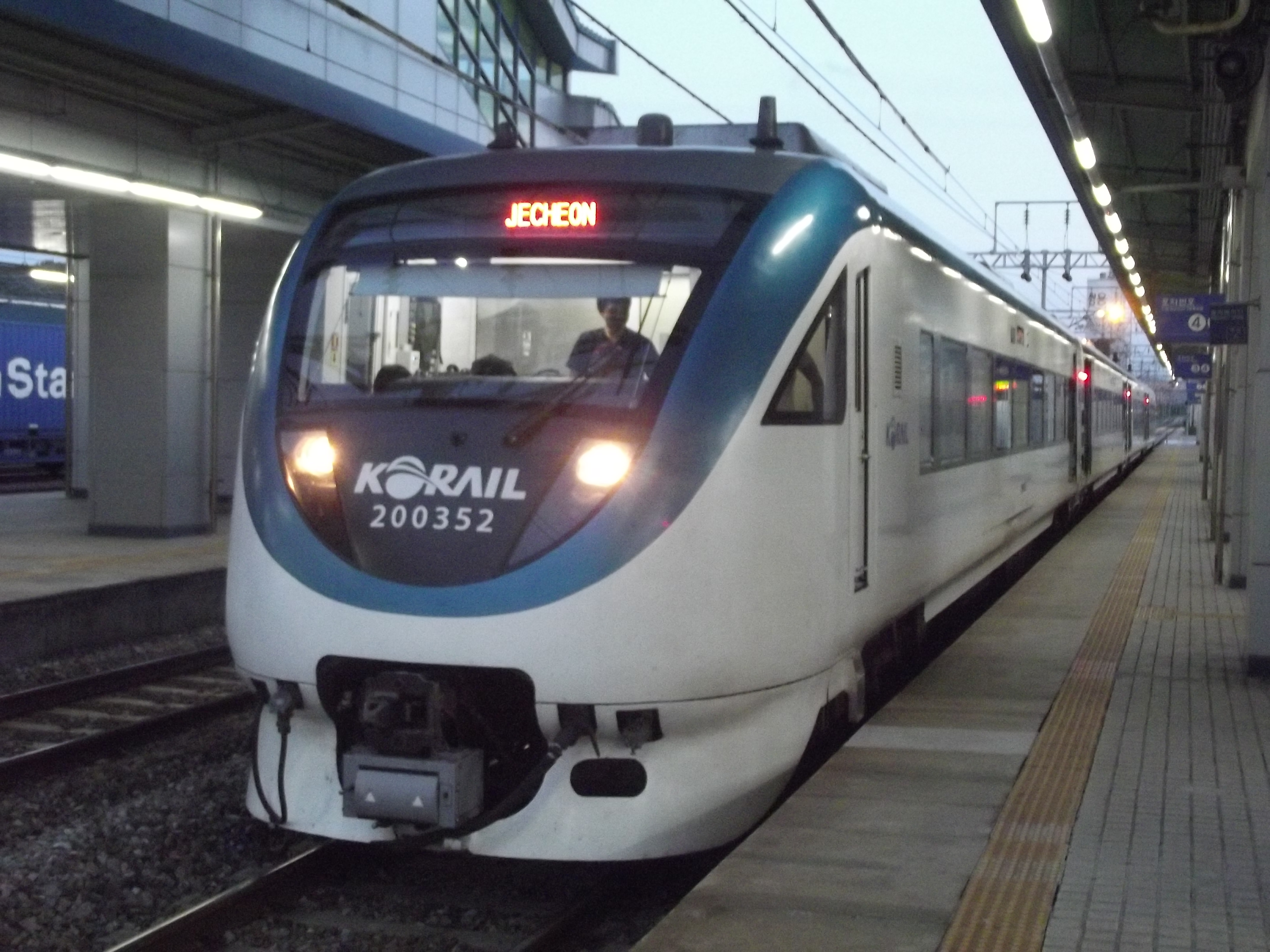
Running Nuriro services on Chungbuk Line in 2013

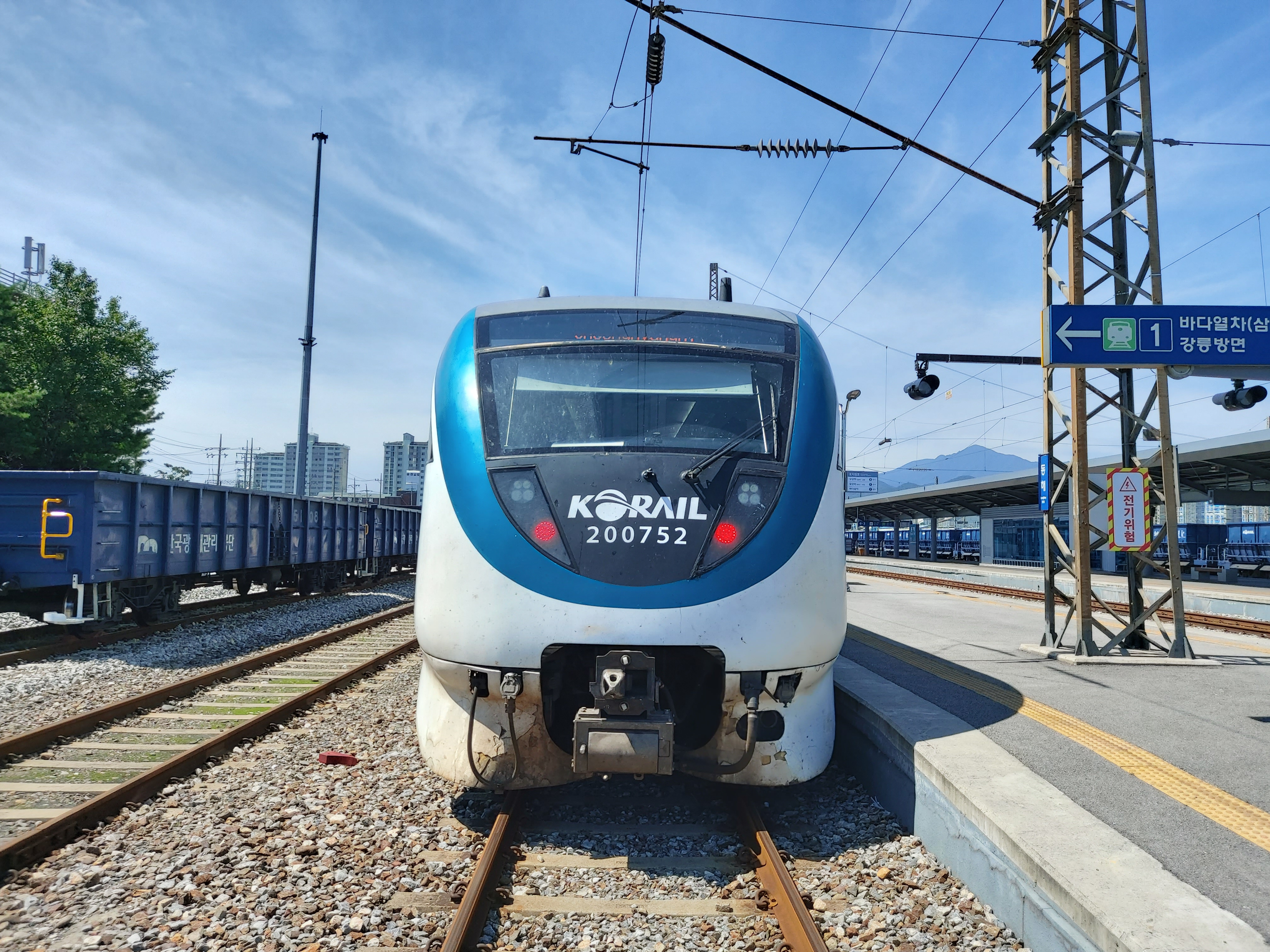
Front design in 2020

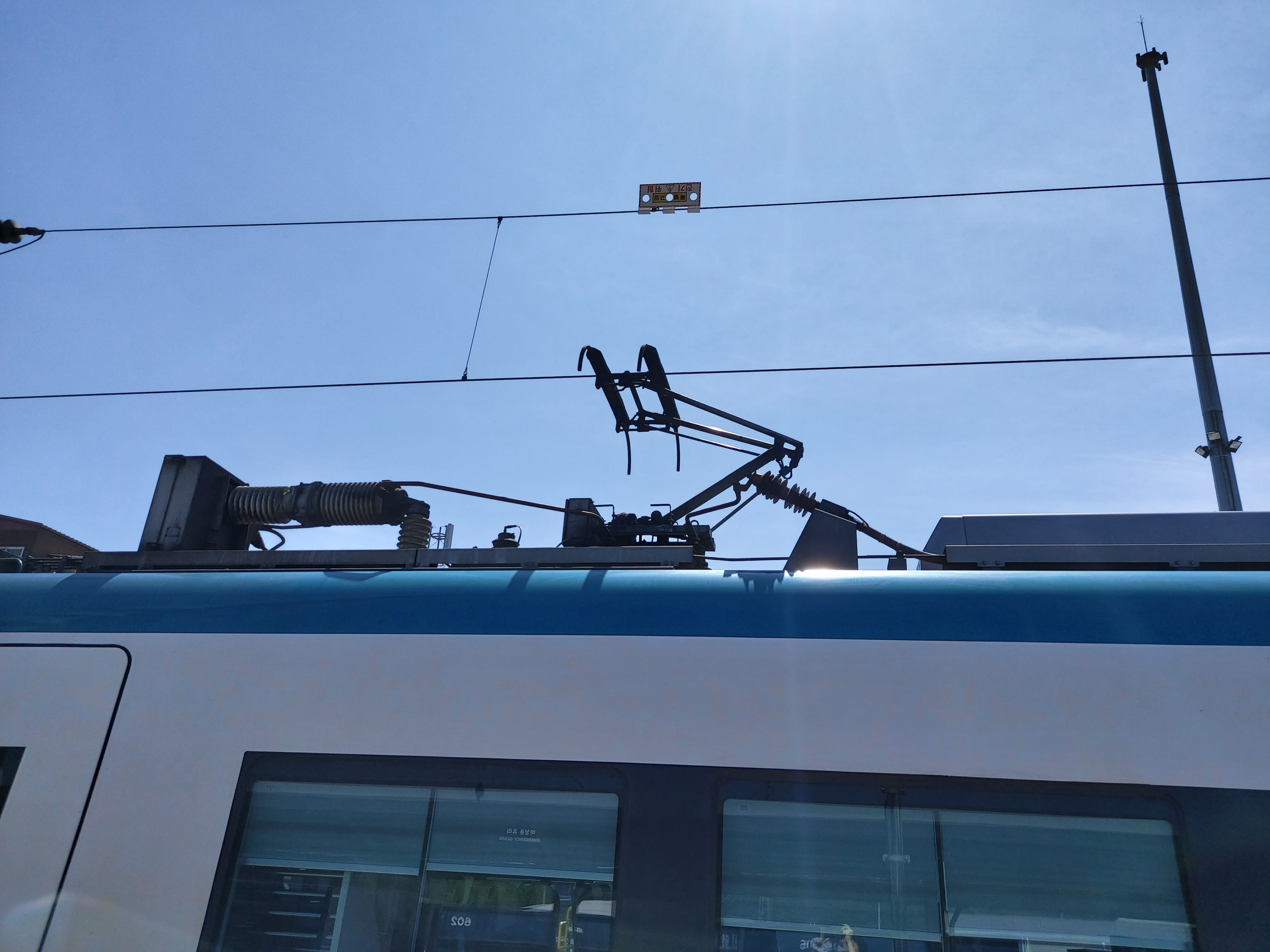
Pantograph

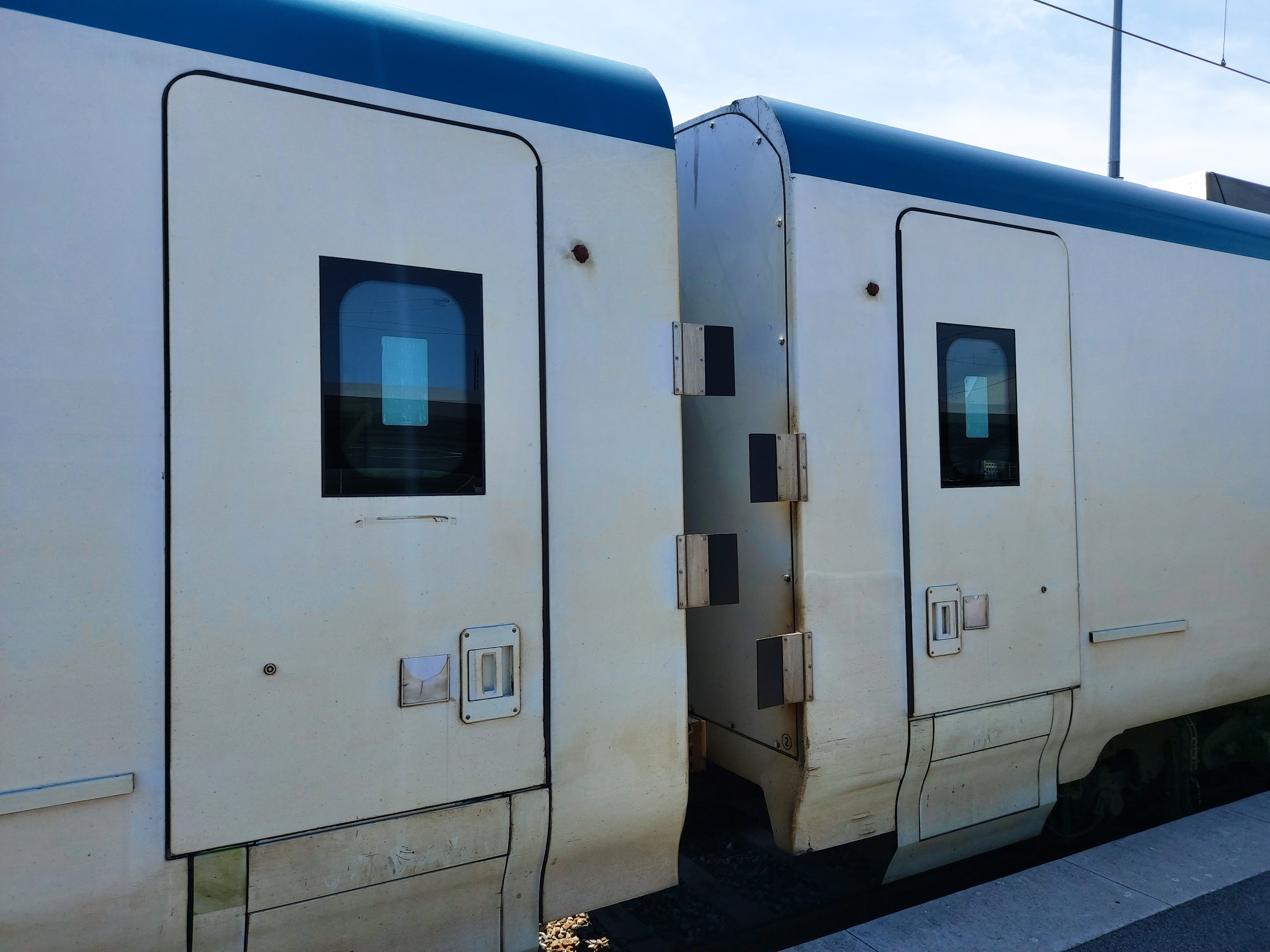
Doors with old livery

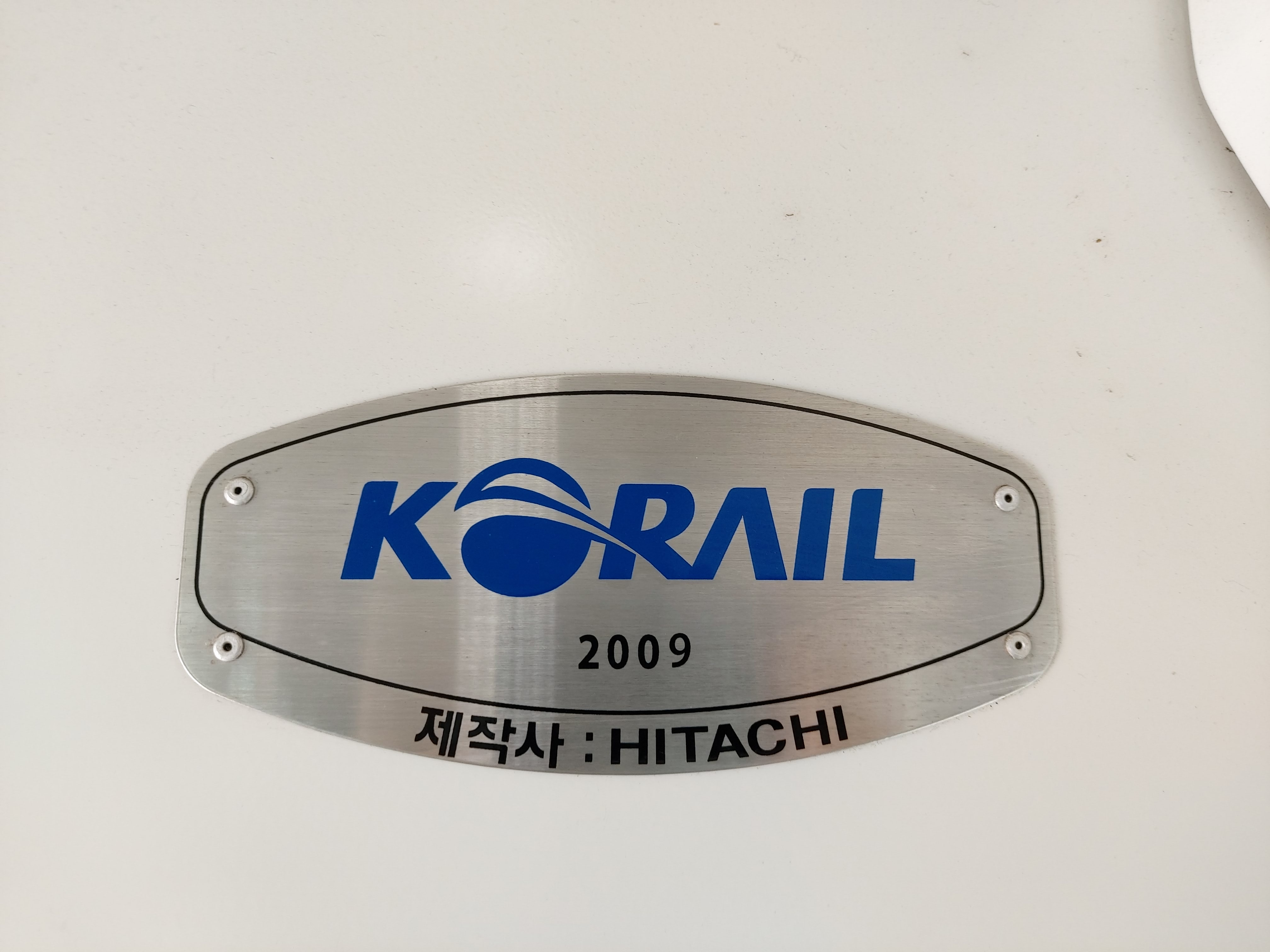
The trainsets were made by Hitachi Rail

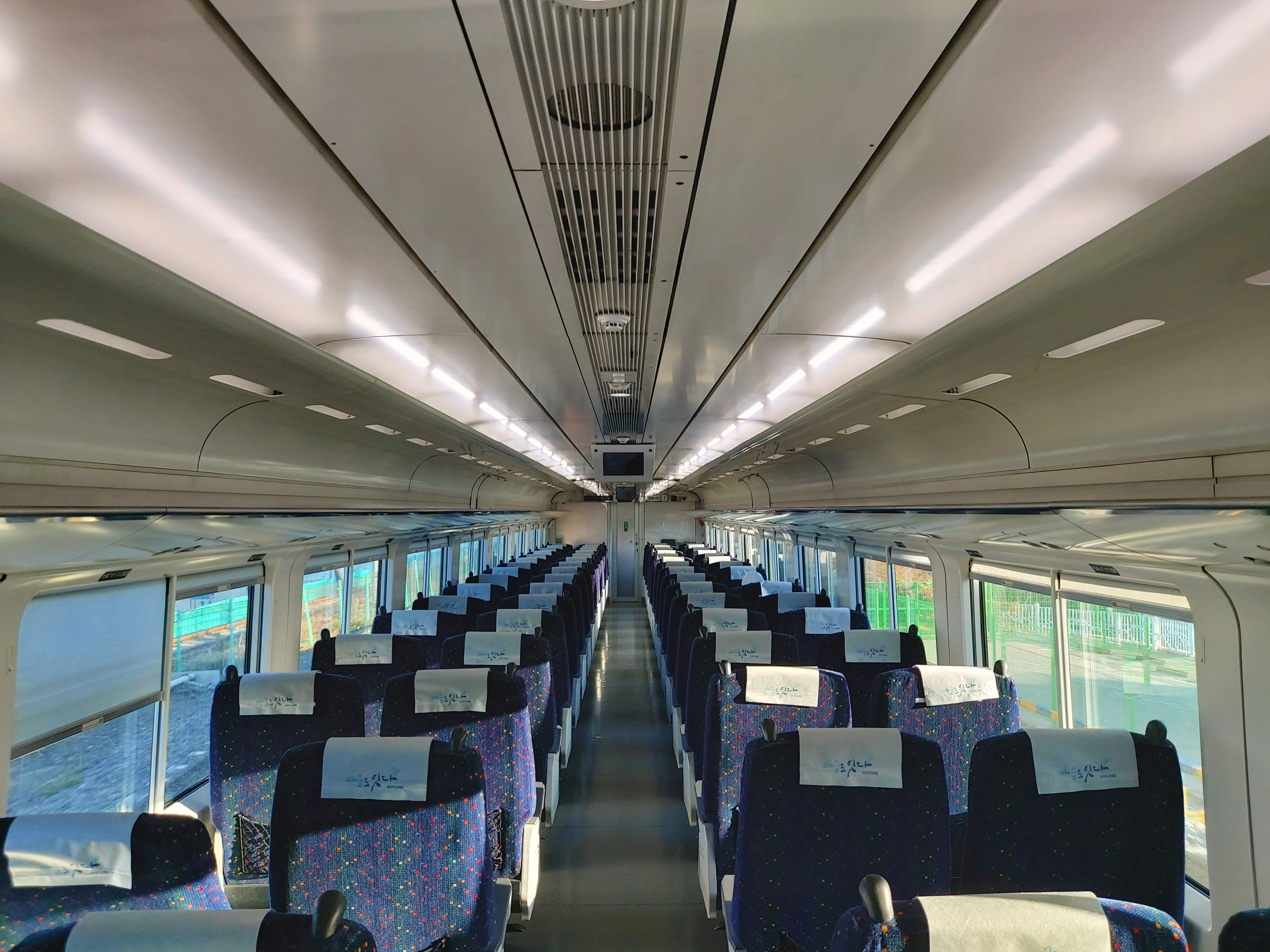
Train interior in 2021

== See also ==
- Nuriro
