= Gyeongju station =

Train station in South Korea

경주
Gyeongju
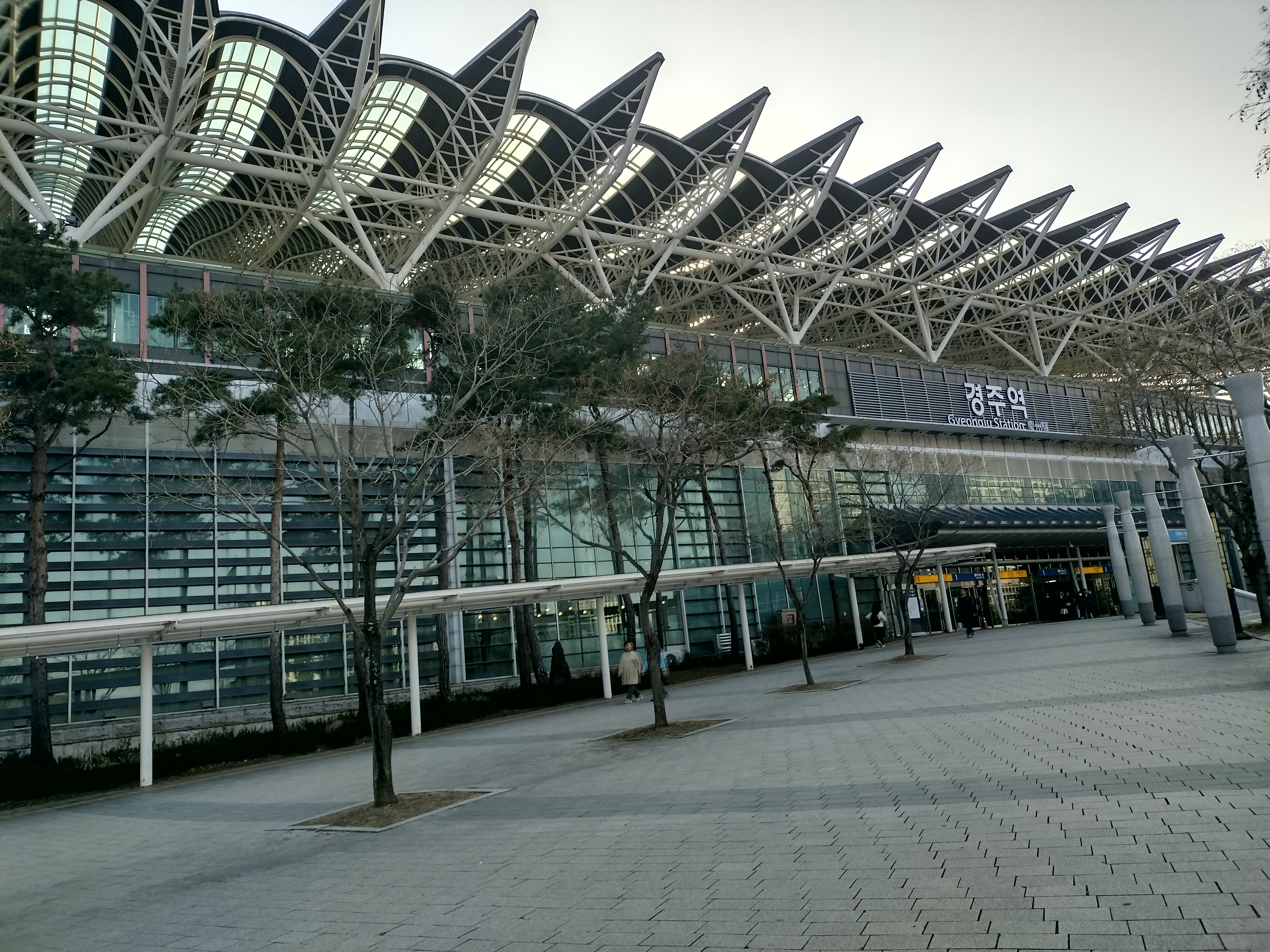
- Station building

Korean name
- Hangul: 경주역
- Hanja: 慶州驛
- Revised Romanization: Gyeongjuyeok
- McCune–Reischauer: Kyŏngjuyŏk

General information
- Location: 80 Gyeongjuyeok-ro, Geoncheon-eup, Gyeongju, Gyeongsangbuk-do; South Korea
- Coordinates: 35°47′54″N 129°08′20″E
- Lines: Gyeongbu High Speed Railway; Donghae Line
- Platforms: 2
- Tracks: 6

Construction
- Structure type: Above ground

History
- Opened: November 1, 2010

Services
Preceding station	Korea Train Express	Following station
Dongdaegu towards Haengsin, Seoul or Suseo	Gyeongbu KTX	Ulsan towards Busan
Yeongcheon towards Seoul	Jungang KTX	Bugulsan towards Bujeon
Taehwagang towards Bujeon	Donghae KTX	Pohang towards Gangneung
Preceding station	Korail	Following station
Seogyeongju towards Pohang	Mugunghwa-ho Donghae Line	Bugulsan towards Bujeon
Yeongcheon towards Dongdaegu	Mugunghwa-ho Donghae Line	Bugulsan towards Bujeon
Ahwa towards Cheongnyangni	ITX-Maum Jungang Line	Bugulsan towards Bujeon
Yeongcheon towards Dongdaegu	ITX-Maum Donghae Line	Bugulsan towards Bujeon
Seogyeongju towards Gangneung	ITX-Maum Donghae Line	Bugulsan towards Bujeon
Ahwa towards Dongdaegu	Nuriro Donghae Line	Bugulsan towards Taehwagang
Location

Gyeongju station (formerly Singyeongju station) is a station near the city of Gyeongju. It is on the Gyeongbu KTX Line and Donghae Line. Its former name Singyeongju station means "new Gyeongju station".
