= Ulsan Station =

Train station in South Korea

Coordinates: 35.55189°N 129.13837°E

울산 (통도사)
Ulsan
(Tongdosa)

Korean name
- Hangul: 울산역
- Hanja: 蔚山驛
- RR: Ulsan-yeok
- MR: Ulsan-yŏk

General information
- Location: 177, Ulsanyeok-ro, Samnam-eup, Ulju-gun, Ulsan; Republic of Korea
- Operator: Korail Busan-Gyeongnam Regional HQ
- Line: Gyeongbu High Speed Railway
- Platforms: 2

History
- Opened: November 1, 2010

Passengers
- 2013.04: 12732 per day ▲9.8%

Services
| Preceding station | Korea Train Express | Following station |
|---|---|---|
| Gyeongju towards Haengsin, Seoul or Suseo | Gyeongbu KTX | Busan Terminus |
Location

Ulsan station is a South Korean high-speed rail station located in Samnam-eup, Ulju-gun. It is on Gyeongbu High Speed Railway and named Ulsan Station with subname Tongdosa, which is located in Yangsan, nearer than downtown Ulsan from the station. The existing Ulsan Station in Samsan-Dong, Nam-gu has been renamed to Taehwagang station.

== History ==
Ulsan station had not planned for second phase of Gyeongbu HSR, although Ulsan is one of the largest metropolitan cities in South Korea. But with constant civil petitions, President Roh Moo-hyun appealed positive reaction, and the station was added to the plan from November 14, 2003. In result, it became the most successful case of second phase of Gyeongbu HSR.

=== Subname dispute ===
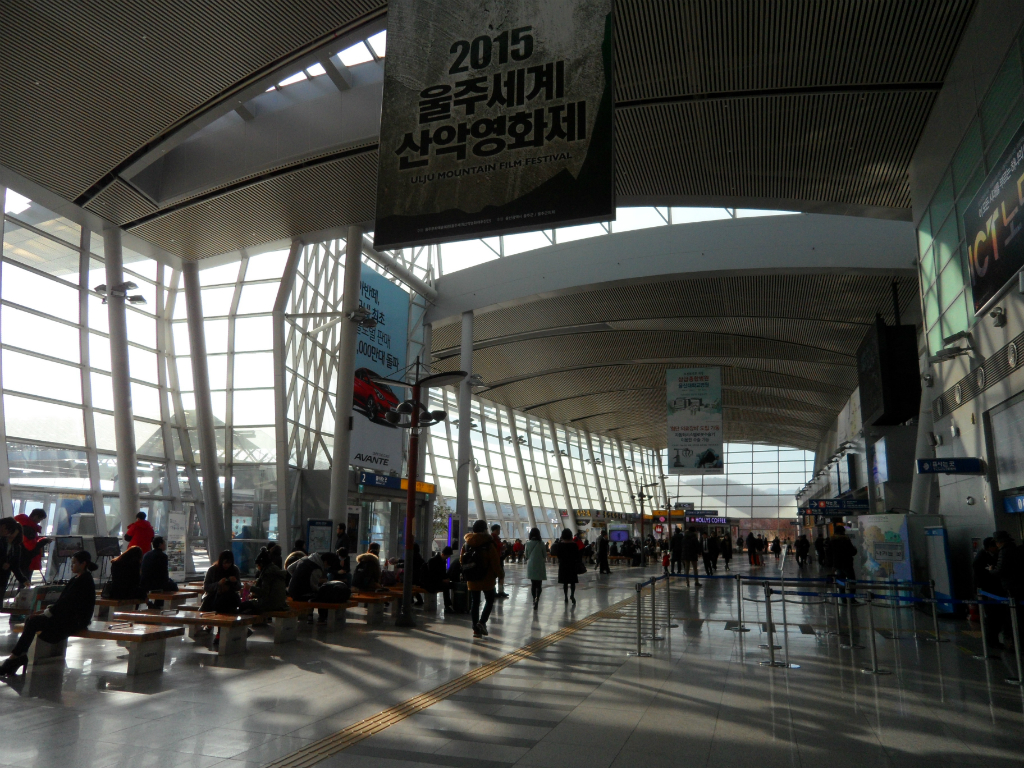
Ulsan station, waiting room

The subname of Ulsan station is Tongdosa, the temple located in Yangsan, not Ulsan. Some Christians didn't agree with the subname, arguing that it is a religious problem. But Korail held a vote, in which 7 of the 9 committee members agreed with the 'Tongdosa' subname. Nonetheless, the subname had not been displayed in the station until 2012.

== Station layout ==
↑ Gyeongju
2 | | | | 1
Busan ↓

| Platform No. | Line | Train | Destination |
|---|---|---|---|
| 1 | Gyeongbu HSR | KTX | For Busan |
| 2 | Gyeongbu HSR | KTX | For Dongdaegu·Osong·Daejeon·Seoul |

== See also ==
- KTX
- Transportation in South Korea
