= Bugulsan Station =

Railway station in South Korea

북울산 (박상진생가)
Bugulsan
(Bak Sangjin Saengga)

Korean name
- Hangul: 북울산역
- Hanja: 北蔚山驛
- RR: Bugulsanyeok
- MR: Pugulsanyŏk

General information
- Location: 620 Auto Valley-ro, Buk-gu; Ulsan; South Korea
- Coordinates: 35°36′53″N 129°22′20″E
- Operator: Korail Busan-Gyeongnam Regional HQ
- Line: Donghae Line
- Platforms: 3
- Tracks: 6

Construction
- Structure type: At-grade

History
- Opened: December 28, 2021

Services
Preceding station	Korea Train Express	Following station
Gyeongju towards Seoul	Jungang KTX	Taehwagang towards Bujeon
Preceding station	Korail	Following station
Gyeongju towards Cheongnyangni	ITX-Maum Jungang Line	Taehwagang towards Bujeon
Gyeongju towards Dongdaegu	ITX-Maum Donghae Line	Taehwagang towards Bujeon
Gyeongju towards Gangneung	ITX-Maum Donghae Line	Taehwagang towards Bujeon
Gyeongju towards Pohang	Mugunghwa-ho Donghae Line	Taehwagang towards Bujeon
Gyeongju towards Dongdaegu	Mugunghwa-ho Donghae Line	Taehwagang towards Bujeon
Gyeongju towards Dongdaegu	Nuriro Donghae Line	Taehwagang Terminus
Location

Bugulsan station (Korean: 북울산역), meaning North Ulsan station, is a train station located in Samsan-dong, Nam-gu, Ulsan. The Donghae Line commuter service between Bujeon and Taehwagang is planned to extend to this station in 2026.

== History ==
- December 28, 2021: Opened as Bugulsan Station
- November 5, 2022: Nuriro begins service
- December 18, 2023: ITX-Maum begins service
