= Ganjeolgot =

Park in Ulsan, South Korea

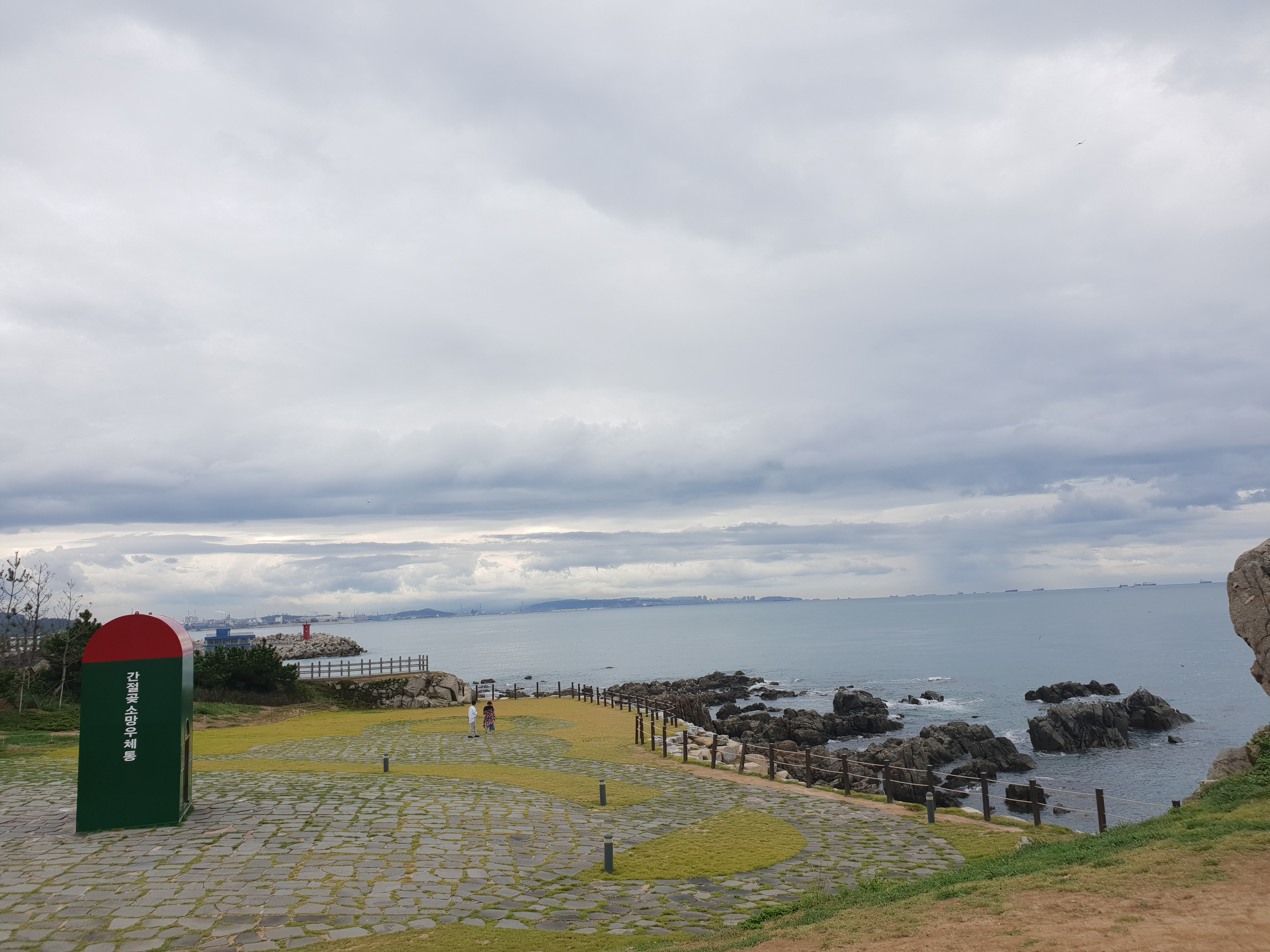
- The park in 2018
- Interactive map of Ganjeolgot
- Location: Seosaeng-myeon, Ulju County, Ulsan, South Korea
- Coordinates: 35.35970°N 129.36161°E

Korean name
- Hangul: 간절곶
- Hanja: 艮絶串
- RR: Ganjeolgot
- MR: Kanjŏlgot

Ganjeolgot (Korean: 간절곶) is a park in Seosaeng-myeon, Ulju County, Ulsan, South Korea.

Due to its position on the southeastern side of the peninsula, it has become a popular destination for viewing the first sunrise of the year. Every New Year's Eve, people gather at the park for the Ganjeolgot Sunrise Festival.

Ganjeolgot is also home to the world's second-largest mailbox, which was built in 2006. People write their wishes on postcards and put them in the mailbox with the belief that doing this will make their wishes come true.

The name Ganjeolgot is composed of two parts: Ganjeol, Chinese for a long bamboo pole used to harvest fruits from tall trees, and Got, a native Korean word meaning "cape." The name refers to the geographical shape of the area.

== See also ==
- List of South Korean tourist attractions
- Tomb of Munmu of Silla
