= Orangdae Park =

Park in Busan, South Korea

- Type: Public park
- Location: Gijang County, Busan, South Korea
- Coordinates: 35.2057°N 129.2277°E

Orangdae Park (Korean: 오랑대공원), also known as Mirangdae (미랑대), is located in Sirang-ri and Yeonhwa-ri in Gijang-eup, Gijang County, Busan, South Korea. The park is open at all hours and year-round.

It is reportedly unclear when it first became a park. The origin of its name is also uncertain; one theory suggests it may have descended from a word called orangkae, synonymous with "barbarian", due to historical foreign invasions. Its total area is 17,334 m^{2} (186,580 sq ft). It is situated along the coastline of Busan, and has sheer cliffs, a wide flat lawn, and a walking trail for visitors.

It is located near a Buddhist temple called Haegwangsa, that was constructed in 1941. Regulated camping is reportedly possible in the park.
