= Gaeunpo station =

Train station in South Korea

개운포; Gaeunpo

Korean name
- Hangul: 개운포역
- Hanja: 開雲浦驛
- Revised Romanization: Gaeunpo yeok
- McCune–Reischauer: Kaeunp'o yŏk

General information
- Location: 133 Saneop-ro, Nam-gu, Ulsan; South Korea
- Coordinates: 35.5079°N 129.3212°E
- Operator: Korail
- Line: Donghae Line
- Platforms: 2
- Tracks: 2

Construction
- Structure type: Aboveground

History
- Opened: August 20, 1992

Services
Preceding station	Busan Metro	Following station
Deokha towards Bujeon	Donghae Line	Taehwagang Terminus
Location

Gaeunpo Station (Korean: 개운포역; Hanja: 開雲浦驛) is a railway station of the Donghae Line in Nam District, Ulsan, South Korea.

Originally, this station was opened as Seonam Station on August 20, 1992, and then reopened as Gaeunpo Station on December 28, 2021.
