= Nuriro =

Class of passenger train service in South Korea

Overview
- Service type: Regional rail
- Status: Operating
- Locale: South Korea
- Predecessor: Short Range Mugunghwa-ho
- First service: June 1, 2009
- Current operator: Korail

Technical
- Rolling stock: Korail Class 200000
- Track gauge: 1,435 mm (4 ft 8 1/2 in) standard gauge
- Operating speed: 150 km/h (93 mph)

Nuriro (Korean: 누리로) is a class of train operated by Korail, the national railroad of South Korea, it was introduced on June 1, 2009, to replace the short-range Mugunghwa-ho. The train was introduced as a replacement for the Bidulgi-ho/Tongil-ho/Mugunghwa-ho operating system between Seoul and Onyangoncheon, and will replace the short-range Mugunghwa-ho when a new train comes in. However, due to various problems, it is currently operating on the Yeongdong and Donghae Lines as a replacement for the Mugunghwa-ho.

== Regular services ==
=== Lines served ===
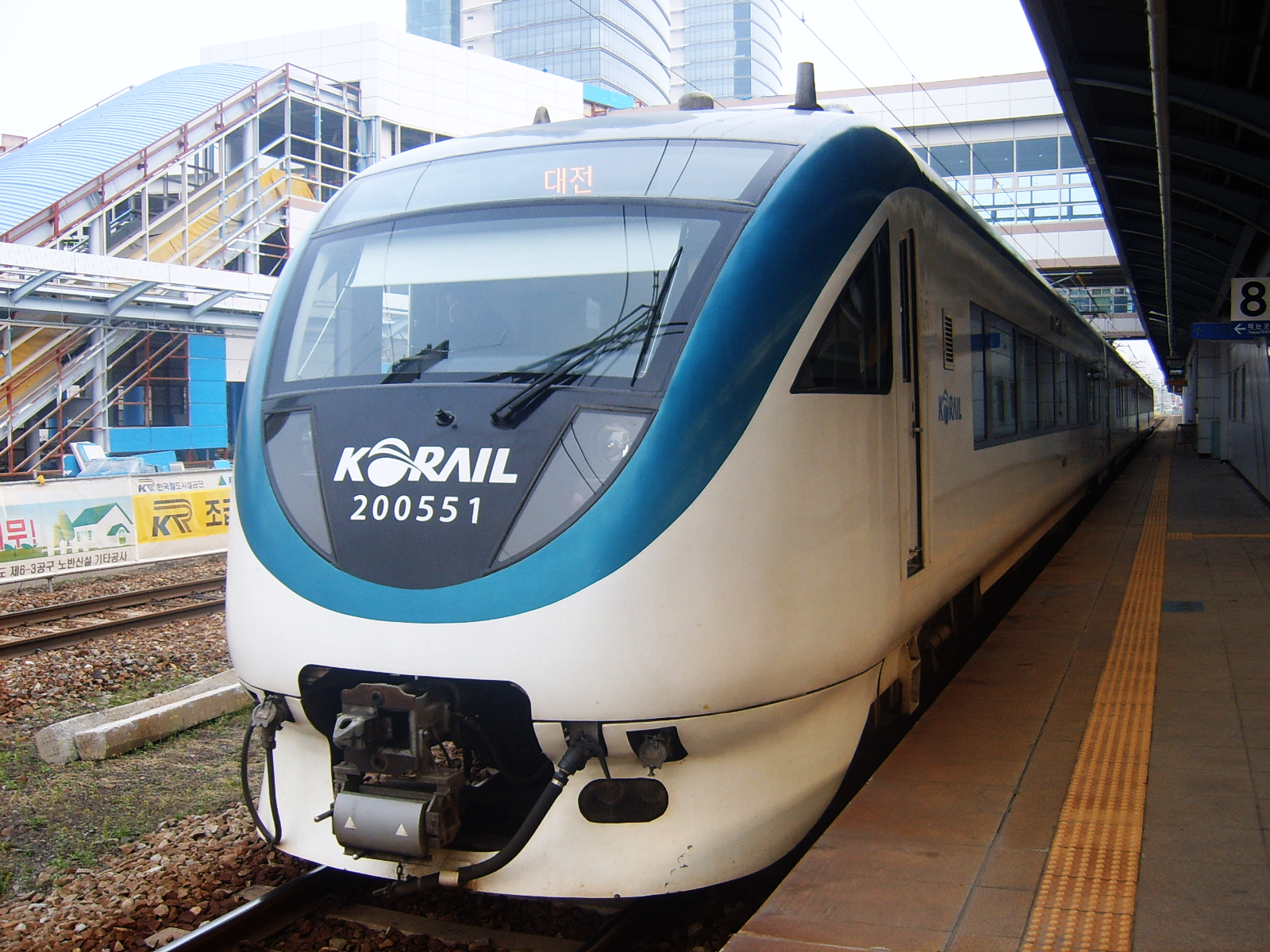
Korail Class 200000 EMU on a Nuriro service waiting at Daejeon in the old livery

Route	Section	Round trip count
Yeongdong Line	Gangneung - Donghae	Once daily
Donghae Line	Dongdaegu - Gangneung	n/a
Donghae Line	Dongdaegu - Taehwagang	6 times daily

=== Stops ===
==== Stations served ====
Yeongdong Line: Gangneung, Jeongdongjin, Mukho, Donghae

Donghae Line: Dongdaegu, Hayang, Yeongcheon, Ahwa, Gyeongju, Bugulsan, Taehwagang

Donghae Line: Dongdaegu, Hayang, Yeongcheon, Ahwa, Seogyeongju, Angang, Pohang, Wolpo, Jangsa, Ganggu, Yeongdeok, Yeonghae, Goraebul, Hupo, Pyeonghae, Giseong, Maehwa, Uljin, Jukbyeon, Heungbu, Okwon, Imwon, Geundeok, Samcheok, Samcheok Haebyeon, Chuam, Donghae, Mukho, Jeongdongjin, Gangneung

== Former services ==
- Janghang Line: Seoul, Yeongdeungpo, Anyang, Suwon, Osan, Seojeong-ri, Pyeongtaek, Cheonan, Asan, Onyangoncheon, Sinchang
- Honam Line
- Jeolla Line
- Chungbuk Line
- Taebaek Line

== Rolling stock ==
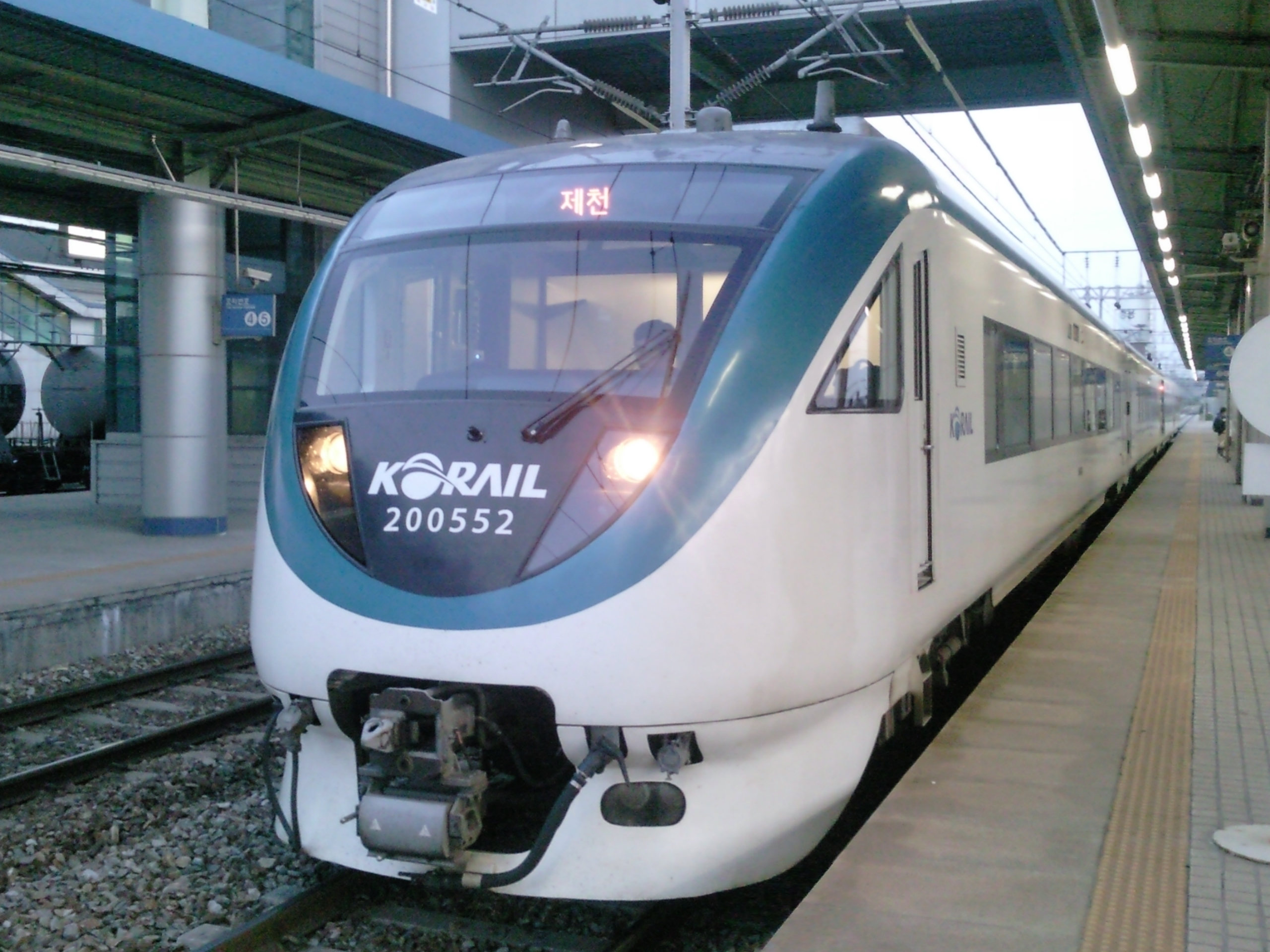
A Korail Class 200000 train in the old livery in May 2010

- Korail Class 200000 (since June 2009)

The first rolling stock was manufactured by Hitachi and Hitachi's A-train technology was also applied.

=== Formations ===
Car No.	1	2	3	4
Accommodation	Reserved	Reserved	Reserved	Reserved
Facilities		Wheelchair space / Toilet	Toilet	

== Interior ==
Seats in a 2+2 abreast configuration. Seat pitch is 980 mm (39 in).

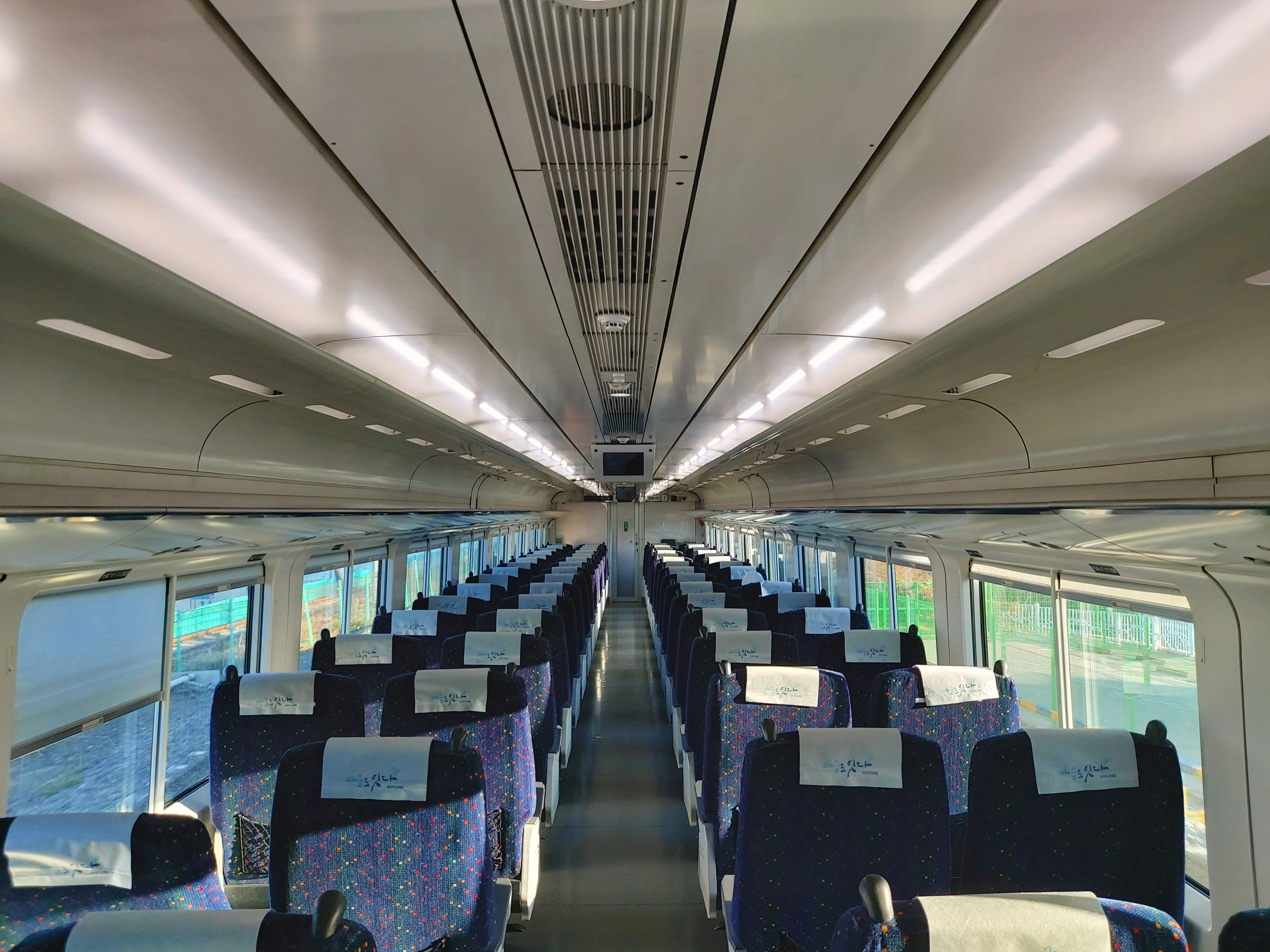
Interior of Train

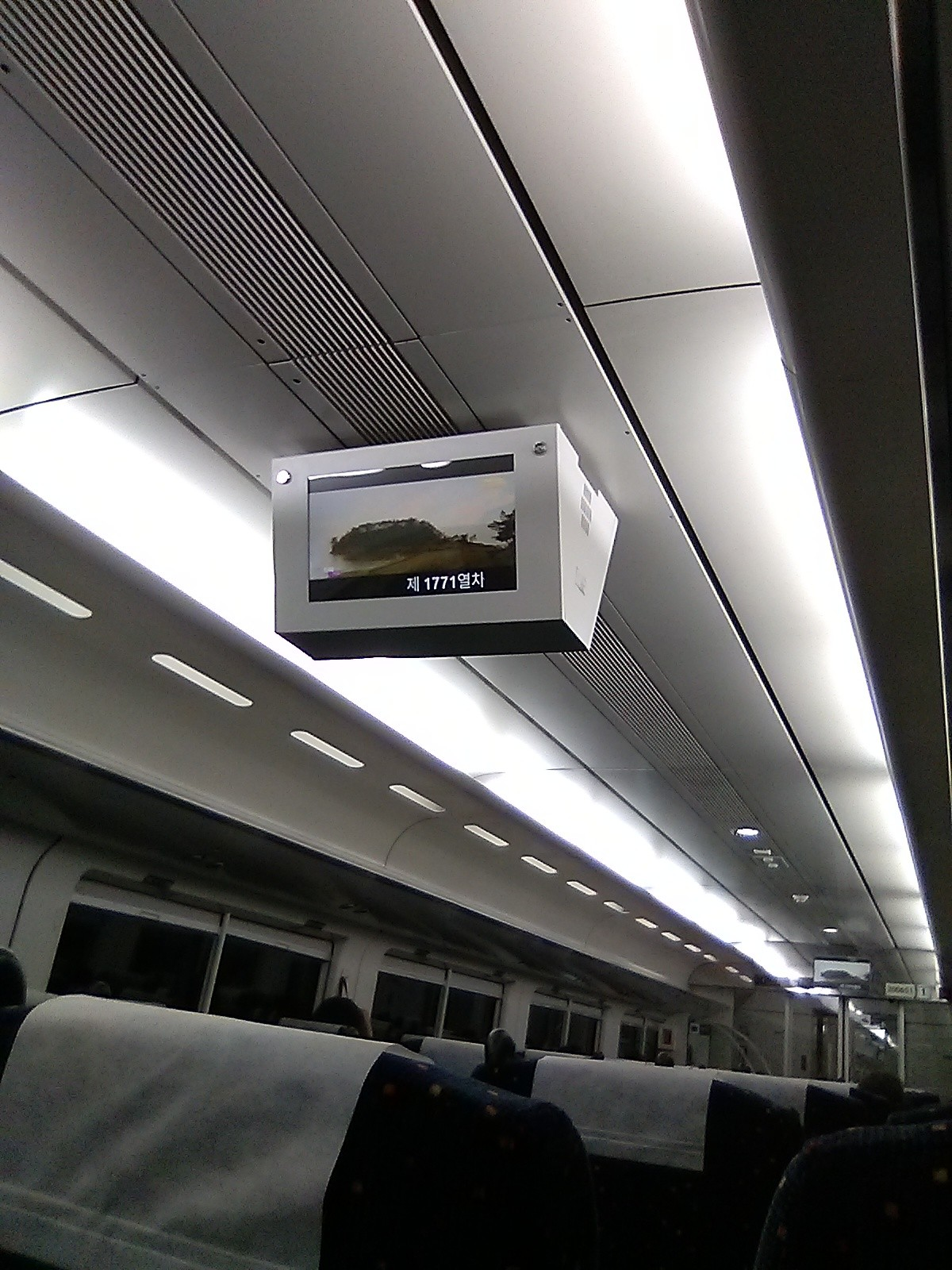
Monitor
