= Seosaeng-myeon =

- Township
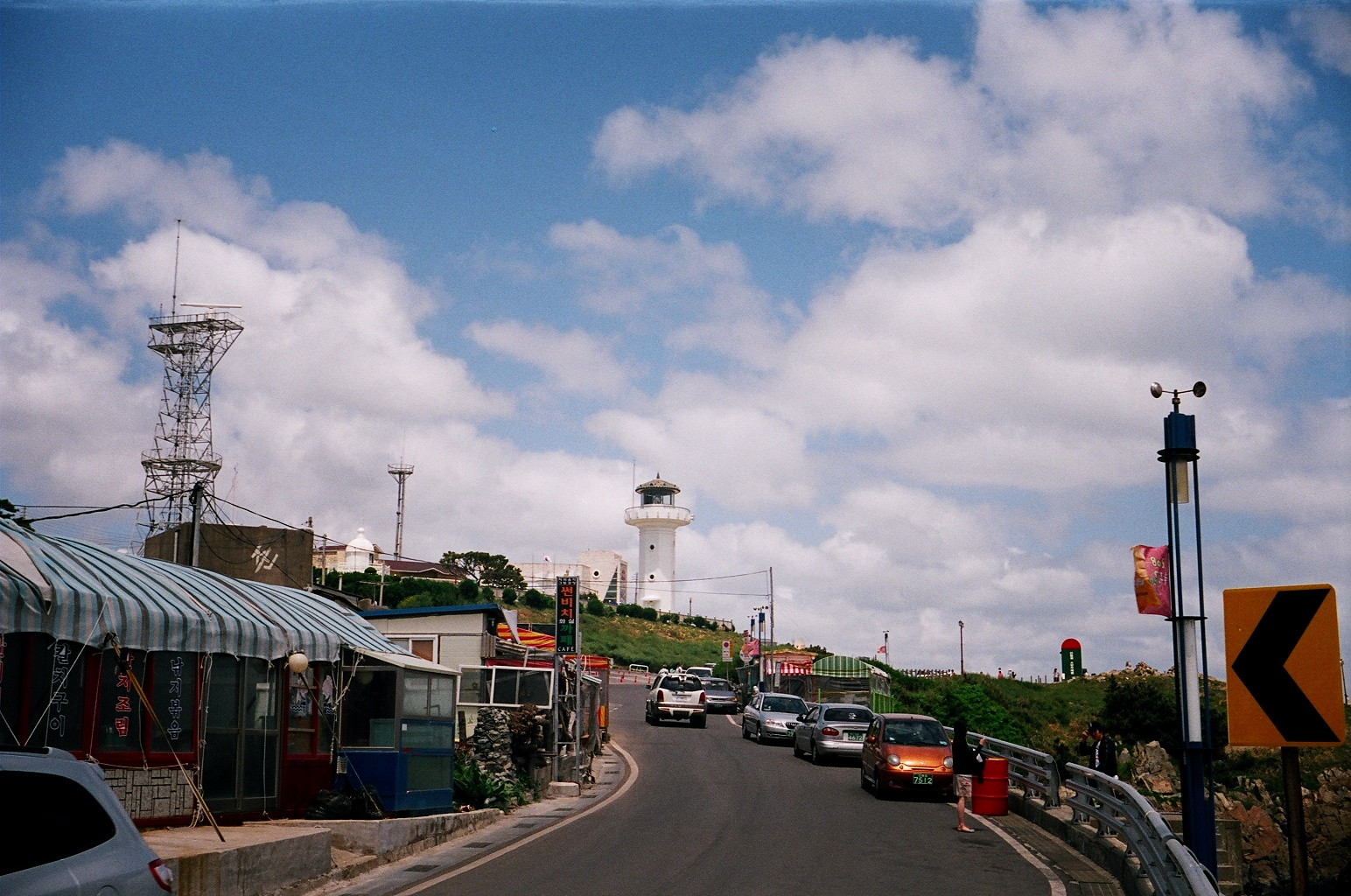
- Scenery at Ganjeolgot Cape, on the eastern edge of the township

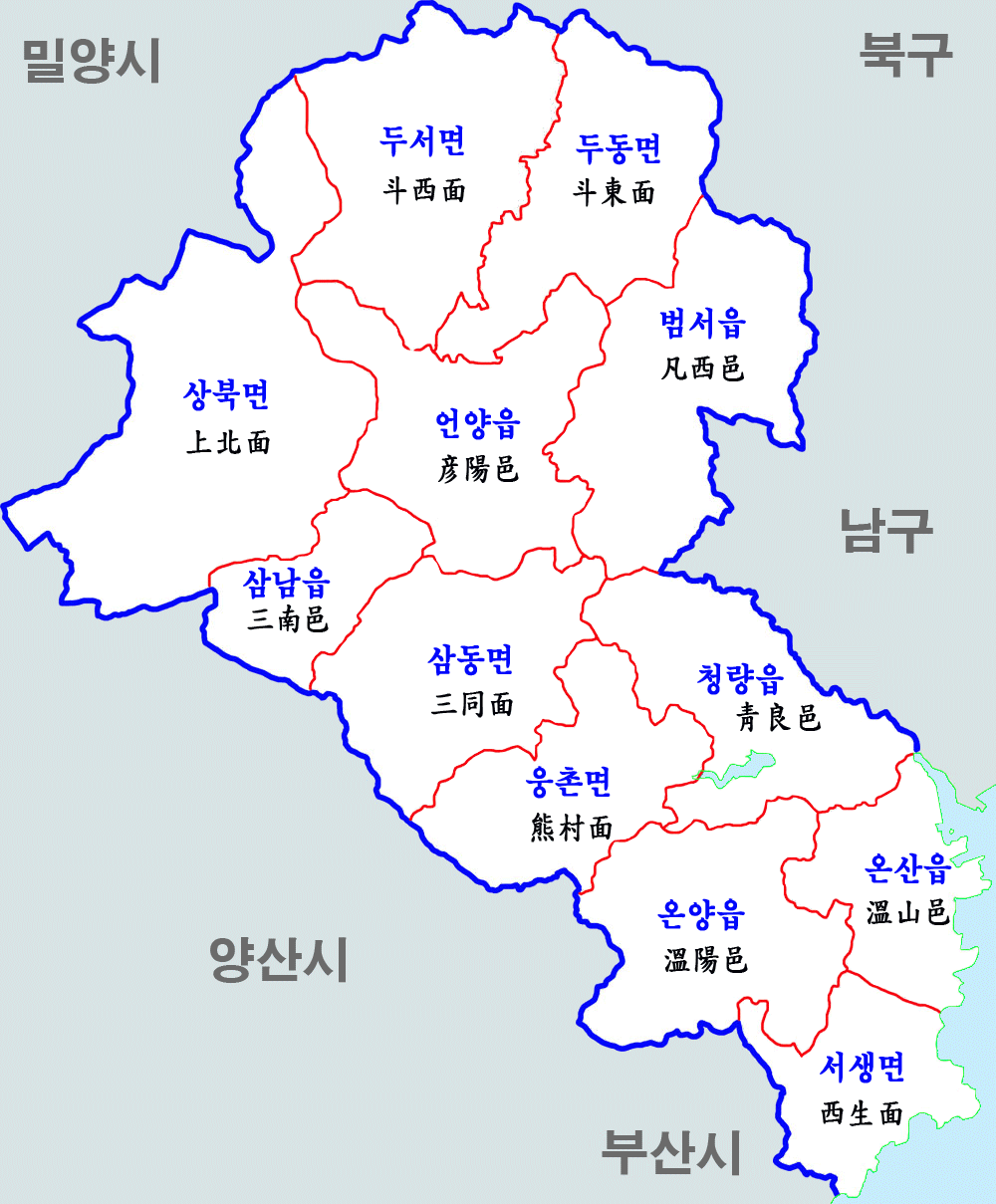
- Map of Ulju County. Seosaeng Myeon is located in the southeastern corner.

- Location within Ulsan Location within South Korea
- Coordinates: 35°21′13″N 129°19′49″E
- Country: South Korea
- Province: Ulsan
- County: Ulju
- Village: 10 villages

Area
  - Total: 36.9 km^{2} (14.2 sq mi)

Population (2022)
  - Total: 8,650
  - Density: 234/km^{2} (607/sq mi)

Korean name
- Hangul: 서생면
- Hanja: 西生面
- RR: Seosaeng-myeon
- MR: Sŏsaeng-myŏn

Seosaeng-myeon (Korean: 서생면) is a myeon of Ulju County, Ulsan, South Korea. As of 2022, its total population is 8,650.

== History ==
During the time of Silla Kingdom, this region is the administrative center of Saengseoryang-gun (생서량군,生西良郡), which governed the area of today's Seosaeng-myeon, Onsan-eup and Onyang-eup. In 757, Saengseoryang-gun was renamed Dongan-gun (동안군,東安郡), and Upung-hyeon (우풍현,虞風縣, present day Ungchon-myeon and Yangsan-si's Ungsang region) was placed under Dongan as a subsidiary county.

During the Goryeo dynasty, Dongan-gun was downgraded to a prefecture and incorporated into Heungryobu (흥려부, present day Ulsan).

In the early Joseon dynasty, a naval manhoyeong (군만호영,萬戶營, division with 10,000 soldiers) stationed in Seosaengpo (서생포,西生浦) in the eastern part of the region. Following the Japanese invasions of Korea in 1592, the commander of the manhoyeong was promoted to the rank of naval dongcheom Jeoljesa (동첨절제사, 同僉節制使). In the 32nd year of King Gojong's reign (1895), as the navy was being abolished, the region was organized into Seosaeng-myeon and put under the direct jurisdiction of dongcheom Jeoljesa.

On September 24, 1906, parts of Onnam-myeon and parts of Seosarng-myeon were incorporated into Oenam-myeon of Yangsan-gun. The myeon office was located in Yeonsan-ri (now Myeongsan-ri).

On April 1, 1912, Oenam-myeon was transferred from Yangsan-gun to Ulsan-gun.

On April 1, 1914, nearby Oenam-myeon, Hwama-dong and Suma-dong of Onnam-myeon were integrated into Seosaeng-myoen, which oversaw 10 villages. The myeon government was located in Seosaeng-ri, and later moved to Sinam-ri.

On April 25, 1952, local election was held and the first 12 township councilors of Seosang-myeon were elected.

On September 1, 1961, the Seosaeng-myeon Council was forcibly dissolved by the military regime of Park Chung Hee.

On June 1, 1962, Seosaeng-myeon was integrated into Ulju-gun.

On January 1, 1963, Seosaeng-myeon was incorporated into Dongnae-gun.

On January 1, 1973, Dongnae-gun was abolished and incorporated into Yangsan-gun.

On February 15, 1983, Seosang-myeon was transferred back to Ulju-gun, the latter of which was promoted to Ulsan Metropolitan City in 1997.

== Administrative divisions ==
Seosaeng-myeon consists of 10 legal villages, 21 administrative villages, and 60 classes. The seat of government is Shinam-ri.

Legal villages	Hangul	Hanja
Shinam-ri	신암리	新巖里
Myeongsan-ri	명산리	明山里
Hwasan-ri	화산리	禾山里
Wiyang-ri	위양리	渭陽里
Yong-ri	용리	龍里
Seosaeng-ri	서생리	西生里
Hwajeong-ri	화정리	禾亭里
Jinha-ri	진하리	鎭下里
Daesong-ri	대송리	大松里
Nasa-ri	나사리	羅士里

== Education ==
=== Elementary school ===
- Myeongsan Elementary School (명산초등학교)
- Seosaeng Elementary School (서생초등학교)
- Seongdong Elementary School (성동초등학교)

=== Middle school ===
- Seosaeng Middle School (서생중학교)

=== University ===
- International Nuclear Graduate School (국제원자력대학원대학교)

== Transportation ==
=== Road ===
National Route 31 is the main road in Seosaeng-myeon.

=== Railroad ===
Donghae Line passes through the western part of Seosaeng-myeon in the Seosaeng station.
