= Gijang County =

Coordinates: 35°15′00″N 129°13′18″E

Gijang
- County
- Yeonhwa-ri, Gijang-eup

- Flag Coat of arms

- Country: South Korea
- Region: Yeongnam
- Provincial level: Busan
- Administrative divisions: 3 eup, 2 myeon

Area
  - Total: 217.9 km^{2} (84.1 sq mi)

Population (September 2024)
  - Total: 176,388
  - Density: 809.5/km^{2} (2,097/sq mi)
  - Dialect: Gyeongsang
- Website: www.gijang.go.kr

Korean name
- Hangul: 기장군
- Hanja: 機張郡
- RR: Gijang-gun
- MR: Kijang-gun

Gijang County (Korean: 기장군) is a gun, or county, located between Haeundae-gu and Ulsan in northern Busan, South Korea.

== History ==
Map of Gijang-gun (1899)

Gijang first appears under its current name in the annals of the year 757, during the Unified Silla period. At that time it was made the hyeon of Gijang, part of Dongnae-gun. The Samguk Sagi records that it was known as Gaphwayanggok (甲火良谷) previously.

Historical landmarks in the county include the Buddhist temple of Jangansa, said to have been first built by Wonhyo in the 7th century.

== Geography and demographics ==
Gijang is the most rural of Busan's districts, and consists mostly of vacant and agricultural land. Approximately 156.7 of its 217.9 square kilometers are empty and forested, mostly hilly land. The county's population has risen steadily since 1990, when it stood at 56,847. There is a fishing village set along the coastline.

== Economy ==
Due to its location along the coast of the East Sea, Gijang is known as a center for the production of various kinds of seafood. These include anchovies and brown seaweed (miyeok).

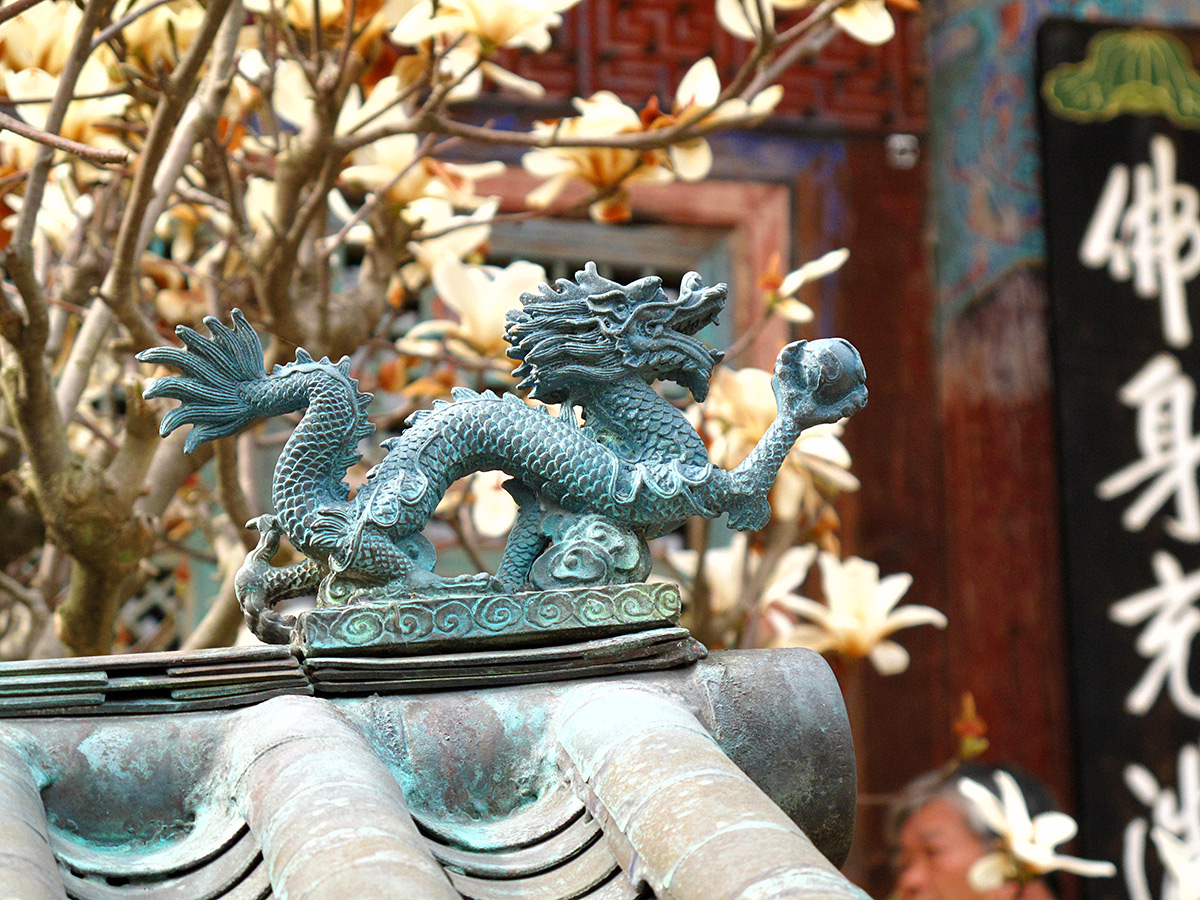
Dragon metalwork at Jangangsa temple

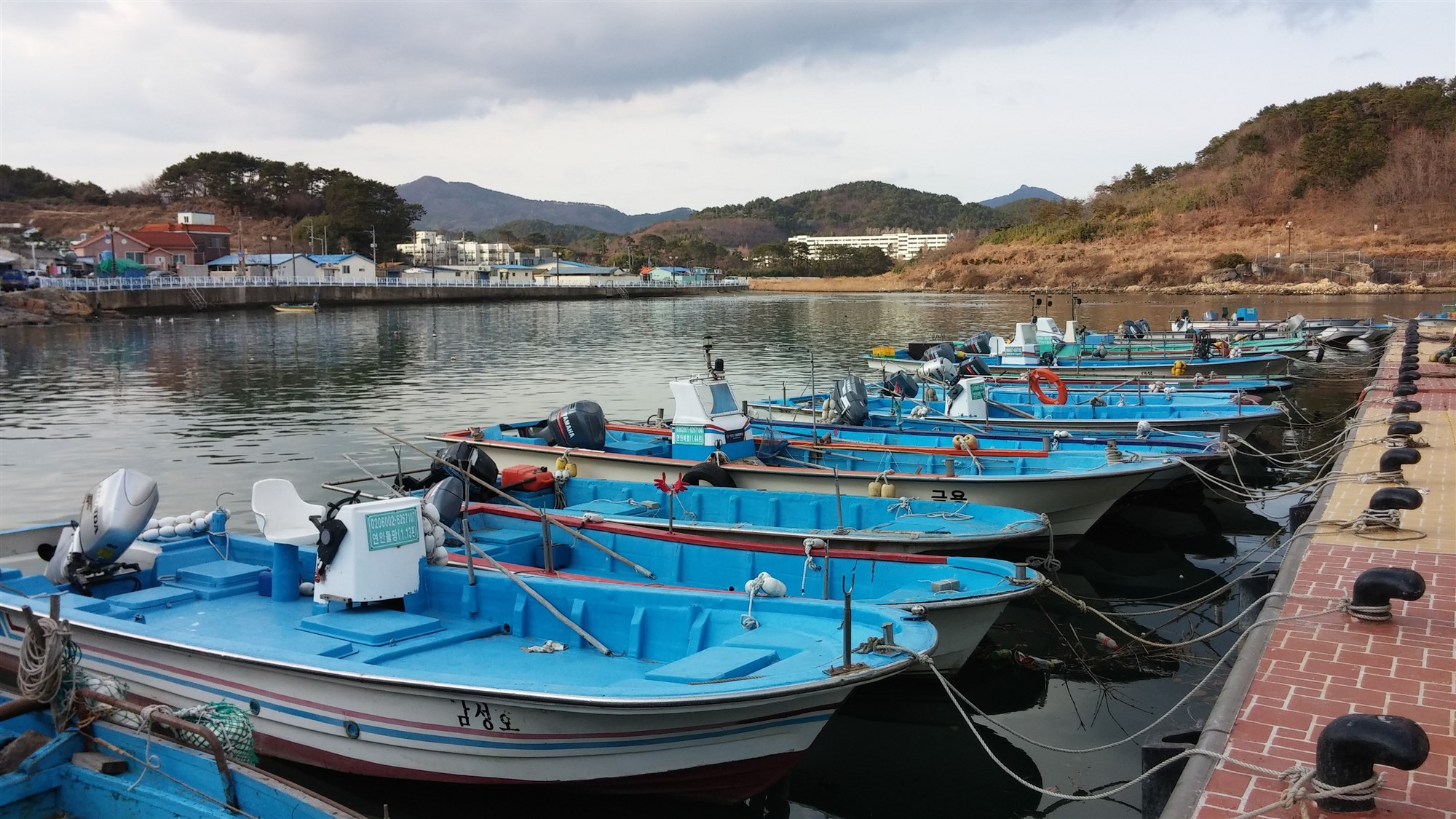
Gijang fishing village

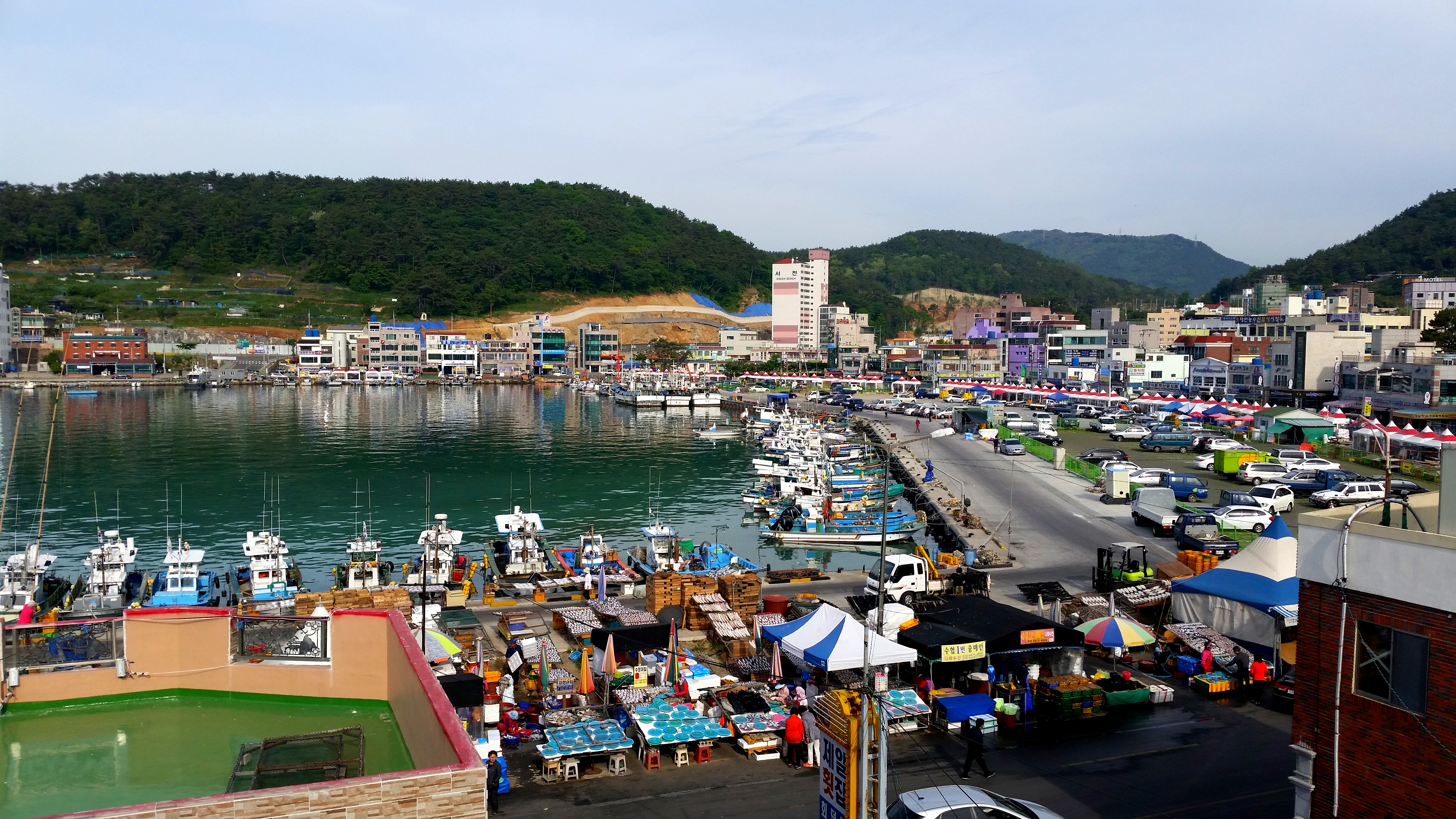
Port of Daebyeon

== Education ==
Gijang is also the current residence of the new Busan International Foreign School, which the Ministry of Education recently spent 46.9 billion won.

One elementary school, Daebyun Elementary School, was nicknamed the "poop school" since "Daebyun" meant feces. Its name originated from the village Daebyun-ri, which derived from the Daedonggobyunpo Port. The school opened in 1963, and in August 2017 it had 76 students. That month the school announced it was changing its name effective 2018.

It also offers adult education and lifelong learning opportunities in areas of humanities, technology, languages, arts and professional studies.

== Tourism ==
Other points of interest in the Gijang area include Toam Pottery Park and Ilgwang Beach, as well as the cliffside Haedong Yonggungsa temple. The fishing village is popular for its fresh seafood and sashimi.

It contains Orangdae Park.

=== Daejeon Port ===
Daejeon Port, located 4.1 km north of Haedong Yonggungsa Temple, accounts for 60% of the national anchovy catches and is called an anchovy port.

Around April, during the anchovy fishing season, fishermen at the port use raincoats, hats, boots, and rubber gloves while handling their nets. From the entrance to Daejeon Port, the port area can be viewed from above before entering the harbor and following the road around the waterfront. A Suhyup building is located at the end of the port, with a small coastal road continuing beyond it.

== Administrative divisions ==
Administrative divisions

Gijang is divided into five parts:

- eup (larger towns):
  - Jeonggwan-eup
  - Gijang-eup
  - Jangan-eup
- myeon (rural townships):
  - Cheolma-myeon
  - Ilgwang-myeon

== See also ==
- Administrative divisions of South Korea
- Geography of South Korea
