= Taehwagang station =

Railway station in South Korea

태화강
Taehwagang
태화강; Taehwagang

Korean name
- Hangul: 태화강역
- Hanja: 太和江驛
- Revised Romanization: Taehwagangnyeok
- McCune–Reischauer: T'aehwagangnyŏk

General information
- Location: 654 Saneop-ro, Nam-gu; Ulsan; South Korea
- Coordinates: 35°32′20.83″N 129°21′15.17″E
- Operator: Korail Busan-Gyeongnam Regional HQ
- Lines: Donghae Line; Jangsaengpo Line; Ulsanhang Line
- Platforms: 2
- Tracks: 4

Construction
- Structure type: Aboveground

History
- Opened: October 25, 1921
- Former names: Ulsan

Services
Preceding station	Busan Metro	Following station
Gaeunpo towards Bujeon	Donghae Line	Terminus
Regional services
Preceding station	Korea Train Express	Following station
Bugulsan towards Seoul	Jungang KTX	Namchang towards Bujeon
Bujeon Terminus	Donghae KTX	Gyeongju towards Gangneung
Preceding station	Korail	Following station
Bugulsan towards Cheongnyangni	ITX-Maum Jungang Line	Namchang towards Bujeon
Bugulsan towards Dongdaegu	ITX-Maum Donghae Line	Namchang towards Bujeon
Bugulsan towards Gangneung	ITX-Maum Donghae Line	Namchang towards Bujeon
Bugulsan towards Pohang	Mugunghwa-ho Donghae Line	Namchang towards Bujeon
Bugulsan towards Dongdaegu	Mugunghwa-ho Donghae Line	Namchang towards Bujeon
Bugulsan towards Dongdaegu	Nuriro Donghae Line	Terminus
Location

Taehwagang station, meaning Taehwa River station, is a train station located in Samsan-dong, Nam-gu, Ulsan. It was previously named Ulsan station until the KTX Ulsan station opened on November 1, 2010.

== History ==
- October 25, 1921: Service opened at Seongnam-dong, Jung-gu
- December 1, 1935: Service moved to former Hakseong-ri, Ulsan-gun with standard gauge
- April 26, 1953: Promotion in status to level 5 station
- September 10, 1971: Designated as civilian coal arrival processing station
- August 21, 1979: Cancellation of designation as civilian coal arrival processing station (However, processing occurred provisionally until October 15, 1979)
- 1987: Announcement of relocation of Ulsan City Rail
- October 22, 1989: Started Seoul–Ulsan Saemaeul-ho
- August 20, 1992: Service moved to 8-8 Samsan-dong, Nam-gu, the current place
- October 15, 2002: Raised the number of Saemaeul Express for Seoul–Ulsan
- June 1, 2007: Seoul–Ulsan Saemaul line extended to Seoul–Bujeon
- November 1, 2010: Renamed to Taehwagang Station due to the station on Gyeongbu HSR, and reduced Seoul–Bujeon Saemaeul line to Dongdaegu–Bujeon
- December 28, 2021: Donghae Line metropolitan subway extension (between Ilgwang and Taehwa River) opened.
- November 5, 2023: Nuriro operation begins
- December 18, 2023: ITX-Maum operation begins
- December 20, 2024: KTX-Eum operation begins between Cheongnyangni and Bujeon
