= Donghae Nambu Line =

Railway line in South Korea

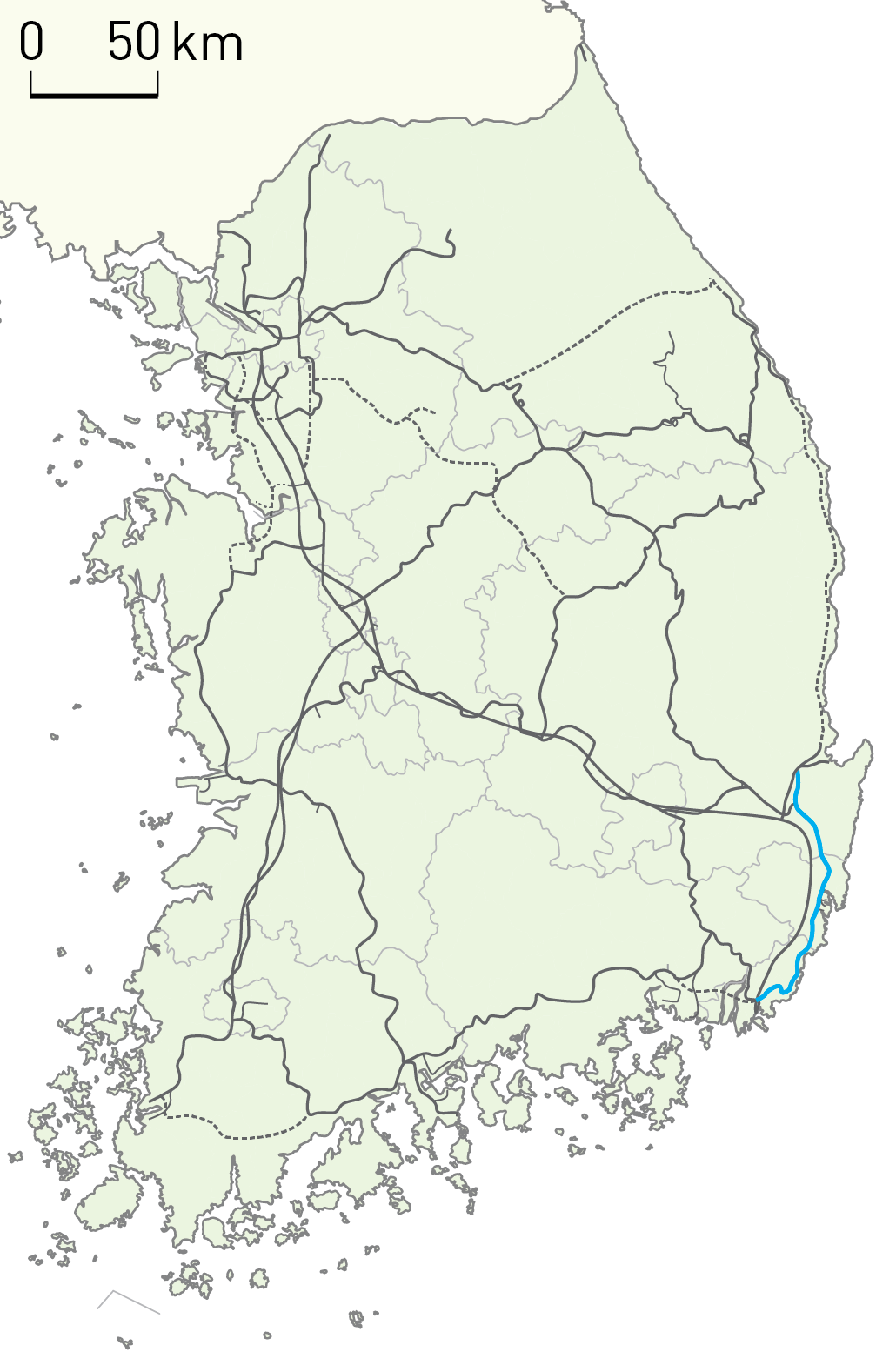

Overview
- Status: Integrated into Donghae Line
- Owner: Korea Rail Network Authority
- Locale: Busan; Ulsan; North Gyeongsang
- Termini: Busanjin; Pohang
- Stations: 37

Service
- Type: Heavy rail; Regional rail; Commuter rail
- Operator: Korail

History
- Opened: Stages between 1918–1935
- Merged: 30 December 2016

Technical
- Line length: 143.2 km (89.0 mi)
- Number of tracks: Single track
- Track gauge: 1,435 mm (4 ft 8 1/2 in) standard gauge
- Electrification: 25 kV/60 Hz AC Overhead line (Busanjin–Bujeon)

Korean name
- Hangul: 동해남부선
- Hanja: 東海南部線
- RR: Donghae nambuseon
- MR: Tonghae nambusŏn

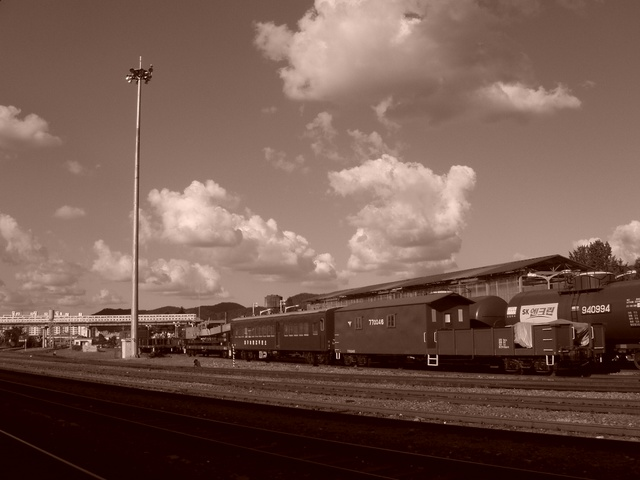
Gyeongju station

The Donghae Nambu Line (Korean: 동해남부선) is a railway line connecting Busan to Pohang in South Korea. The line runs along South Korea's east coast. On December 30, 2016, it was merged into Donghae Line.

== History ==
On October 31, 1918, an extension of the Daegu Line reached Pohang. The section from Gyeongju to Pohang would become the oldest part of the future Donghae Nambu Line. On October 25, 1921, a branch of the Daegu Line from Gyeongju to Ulsan (Taehwagang) was opened. On December 16, 1935, Busan and Ulsan were linked up through the opening of the section Jwacheon–Ulsan. The new line and the two older sections built as part of the Daegu Line were combined into the new Donghae Nambu Line, with a length of 145.8 km (90.6 mi) from Busanjin to Pohang.

=== Upgrade ===
As of 2010, most of the line remains single-track and unelectrified. The entire line is to be upgraded to an electrified-double-tracked railway.

==== Busan–Ulsan ====
Planning for the upgrading of the line started in 1990 already, with the primary aim to improve commuter traffic; construction started in June 2003. The section gets a new 72.1 km long alignment with several tunnels. Korea Rail Network Authority, Busan, and Ulsan city government is undertaking the upgrade. As of 2010, construction progress reached 32% of the total budget of 2,268.9 billion won. The completion of the upgrade is foreseen for 2015.

On September 1, 2010, the South Korean government announced a strategic plan to reduce travel times from Seoul to 95% of the country to under 2 hours by 2020. As part of the plan, the Busan–Ulsan section of the Donghae Nambu Line is to be further upgraded for 230 km/h.

==== Ulsan–Gyeongju–Pohang ====
The line is to be replaced by a completely new alignment that circumvents downtown Gyeongju and connects to the Gyeongbu high-speed railway at Gyeongju station. In 2003, a feasibility study was prepared for the section. Detailed design was started, and in May 2007, the government expected to realise the project from 2008 to 2011 at the earliest. The project was finally approved by the government on April 23, 2009, and a ground-breaking ceremony was held. The altogether 76.56 km line was slated to be opened in December 2014, with a total budget of 2,328.899 billion won. In January 2010, the early completion of the Pohang branch was confirmed by the government.

== Stations ==
Major stations and junctions along the line include (in order):

- Busan station, terminus of the Gyeongbu Line;
- Busanjin station, also on the Gyeongbu Line, just north of Busan Station;
- Beomil station, terminus of the Gaya Line;
- Bujeon station, terminus of the Bujeon Line;
- Dongnae station
- Sinhaeundae station, a popular resort beach in eastern Busan;
- Gijang station
- Namchang station, terminus of the Onsan Line;
- Taehwagang station (formerly Ulsan), major industrial city and terminus of the Jangsaengpo and Ulsanhang Lines;
- Gyeongju station, historic city and terminus of the Jungang Line;
- Hyoja station, terminus of the Goedong Line; and
- Pohang station, seaport and industrial city.

== Services ==
The line sees passenger and freight traffic. As of October 2010, from Bujeon station in Busan, cross-country Mugunghwa-ho trains travel in around 1 hour 25 minutes to Ulsan and in around 2 hours 40 minutes to Pohang. Via the Gyeongbu, Daegu and Jungang Lines, Pohang and Ulsan are connected to Seoul with both intercity Saemaul-ho and cross-country Mugunghwa-ho services. As of 2010, the shortest travel times from Seoul to Pohang are around 5 hours 15 minutes by direct Saemaul service and around 3 hours 40 minutes with transfer to KTX trains at Dongdaegu.

After its upgrade is finished, the role of the line as a corridor for freight traffic will be enhanced.

== Reuse abandoned old railroad of Donghae Nambu Line ==
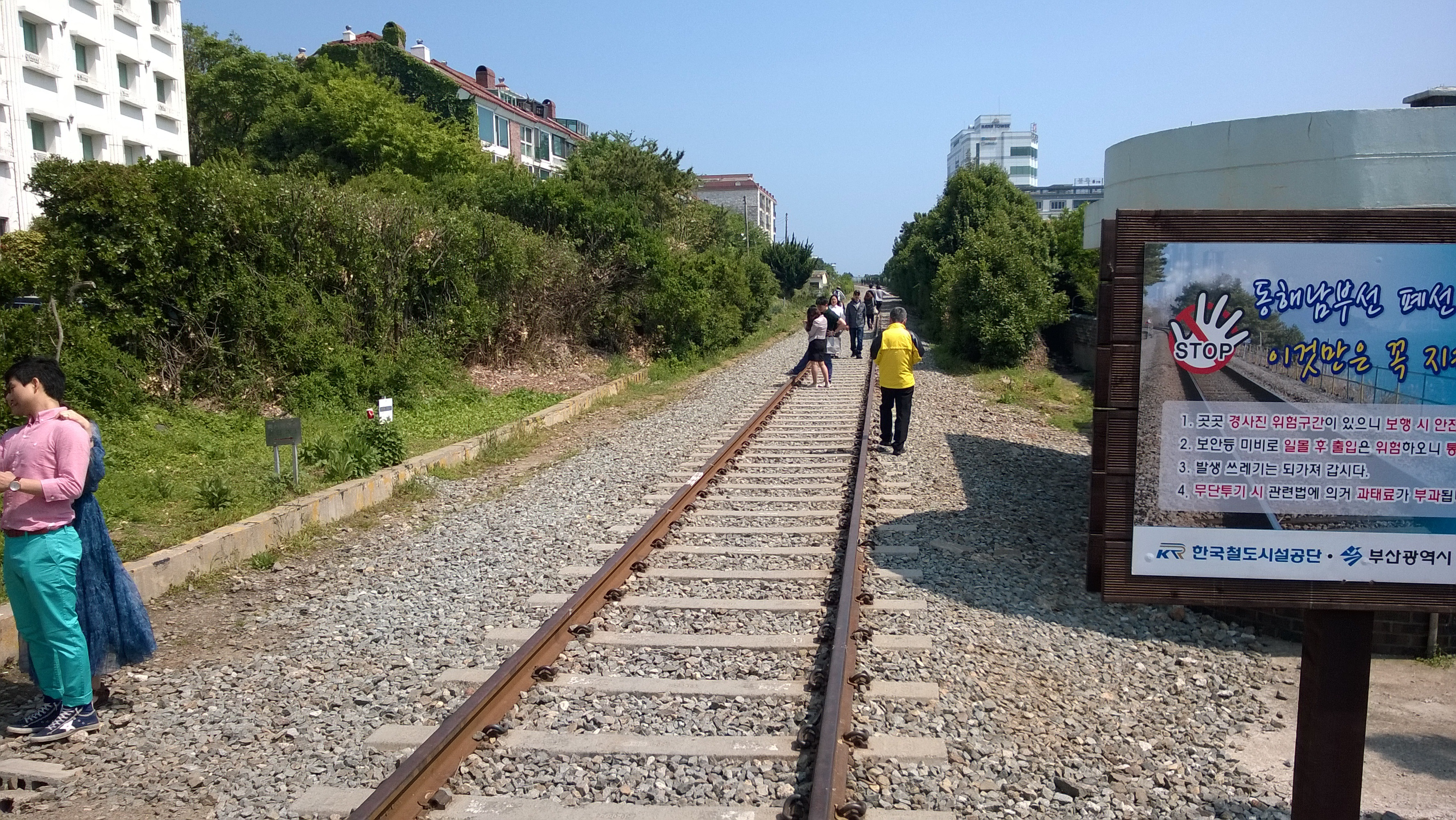
Reuse abandoned old railroad of Donghae Nambu Line

This is an abandoned railroad. Between Ulsan and Busan Donghae Nambu Line a scrapped ship to utilize the space between East-Busan resort complex and that they would work together to Haeundae with connecting the invigoration of the local economy by creating a tourist resources. Haeundae Olympic Intersections created a green rail road that runs through Haeundae Station, the coastal spectacular Mi-po, Cheongsa-po, and Gudeok-po to provide pleasant and energetic spaces for tourists and local residents visiting Haeundae Beach.

=== Project ===
1. Busan Green Rail Way Project 1 - Section is from Haeundae Olympic Junction to Busan Mechanical Technical High School. Period is from Sep 23. 2015 to Dec. 29. 2016. Budget of this step is 3.41 Billion KRW.
2. Busan Green Rail Way Project 2 - Section is from Busan Mechanical Technical High School to East Busan Tourist District Entrance. Period is from Jun. 27. 2016 to Dec. 11. 2017. Budget of this step is 8.1 Billion KRW.

== See also ==
- Korail; South Korea's national railroad operator
- Transportation in South Korea
- Donghae Line
