= Saemaeul-ho =

Class of passenger train service in South Korea

- A Saemaeul-ho train with modified Mugunghwa-ho carriages being hauled by a Hyundai Precision GT26CW-2 locomotive passing Guro station

Overview
- Service type: Regional rail
- Locale: South Korea
- First service: February 10, 1969
- Successor: ITX-Saemaeul
- Current operator: Korail

Technical
- Rolling stock: Korail Class 7300; Formerly: DHC-PP DMU
- Track gauge: 1,435 mm (4 ft 8 1/2 in) standard gauge

- Saemaeul-ho
- Hangul: 새마을호
- Hanja: 새마을號
- RR: Saemaeulho
- MR: Saemaŭrho

The Saemaeul-ho, formerly known as the Saemaul-ho and Saemaul Express, is a class of train operated by Korail, the national railroad of South Korea, since February 8, 1969. Before the introduction of the KTX express trains, the Saemaeul-ho was the fastest class of trains in South Korea, making the journey from Seoul to Busan in less than 5 hours. After the introduction of the KTX and ITX-Saemaeul, Saemaeul-ho trains were gradually retired on most lines, with the last traditional Saemaeul-ho trains on the Janghang Line being retired in 2018. As of 2026, Saemaeul-ho services with modified Mugunghwa-ho passenger cars are still running on the Janghang and Mokpo–Boseong Lines.

Saemaeul-ho trains were distinguished from the more basic Mugunghwa-ho trains by their larger and comfortable seats and the absence of standing passengers. Trains were also distinguished from the Mugunghwa-ho trains by their colour; typical Saemaeul train passenger cars are painted in red and black. In the past, Saemaeul passenger cars were painted in green, blue, and yellow. The length of a Saemaeul train varied from 5 cars to 12 cars, either as one or two sets; certain Saemaeul-ho trains that ran from Seoul to Busan separated at Gupo station, with one half travelling along the Bujeon Line and Donghae Nambu Line to Haeundae, and the travelling down the main Gyeongbu Line to Busan station.

The Saemaeul-ho took its name from the Saemaul Undong, a movement for rural revitalization spearheaded by Park Chung-hee in the 1970s.

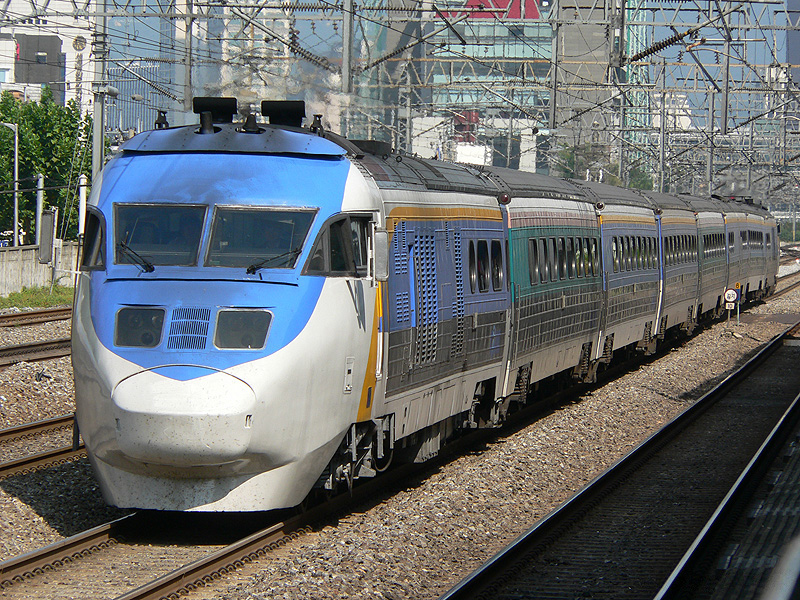
Saemaeul-ho train of DHC-PP DMU cars with a new Korail paint scheme (since retired).

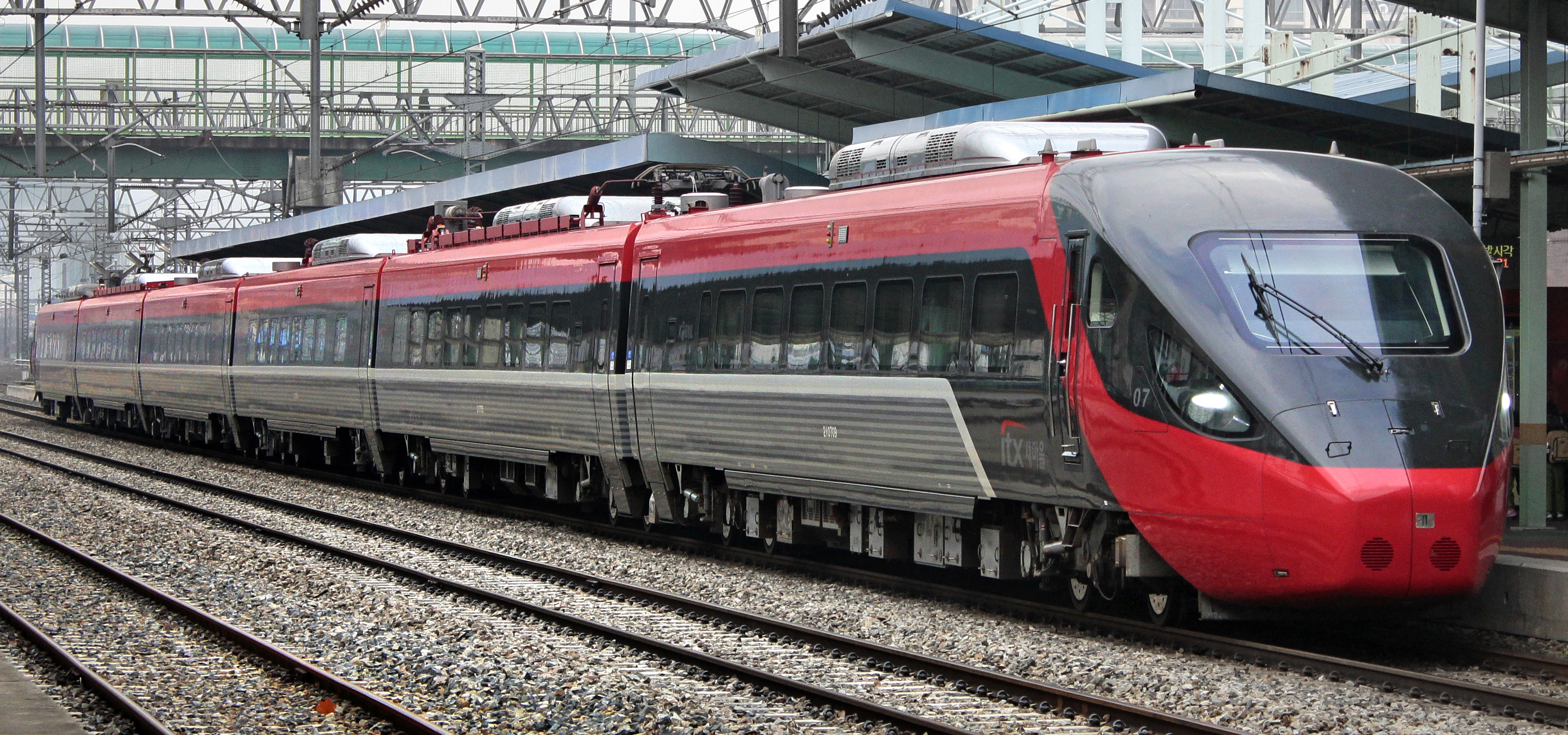
New ITX-Saemaeul train

The Saemaeul-ho class started to be phased out by the ITX-Saemaeul starting on May 12, 2014. The new ITX-Saemaeul trains have a faster average speed of 150 kilometers per hour, and replaced the older Saemaeul trains gradually until April 30, 2018 when the last traditional Saemaeul-ho train ran between Iksan and Yongsan on the Janghang Line.

== Rolling stock numbers ==
- Streamlined Saemaeul passenger car (1986-1993) - #38–39, #10031–10033, #10051–10059
- Diesel Hydraulic Car (DHC) (also known as Push-Pull) (1987-2013)- #101–216, #251–262, #301–446, #501–513, #521–585, #611–649, #701–715, #751–755, #781–787
- Long-length Saemaeul passenger car (1990-2015) - #41–50, 10041–10047, #10086, #11084–11101
- Limit passenger car (refurbished for Saemaeul service) (2017–present)

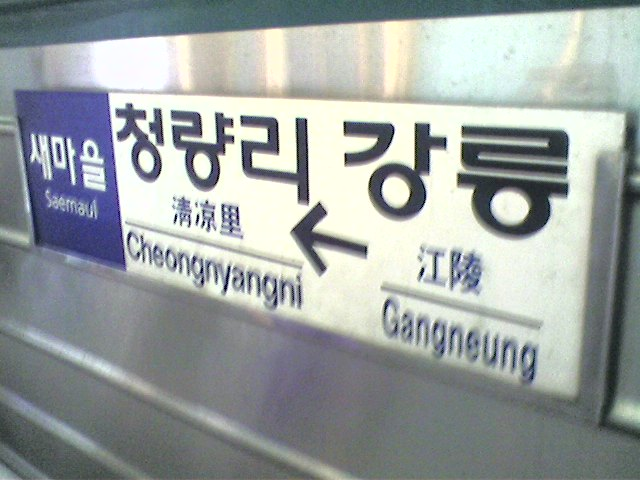
Destination Panel for Saemaeul-ho

== Carriage ==
=== Rectangular carriage ===
Right angle type Saemaeul coach On February 8, 1969, the Saemaul-ho was built and introduced in succession from 1982 until the year of its opening. In early 1975, Daewoo Heavy Industries Co., Ltd., which was preparing for the development of high-class domestic passenger cars, supplied 2 units, which were successfully developed and manufactured in the design based on Japan imported Saemaul coach cars. From 1979 to 1982, it was distributed to Daewoo Heavy Industries and Hyundai Precision Industries. Welded research steel plate, mild steel material, the wall is designed to be rectangular. The guest room garden was usually 56 seats and was the seat of a typical Japanese limited train style. The armrests had the same color as the seat, and the reclining angle was so great that it would hinder the backseat. There were no calves or braces. The initial painting was based on ivory color, and consisted of a window line and a blue band at the lower end of the carriage. It was similar to the Japanese Shinkansen 0 system. In addition, the NT-21 bogie of the disc braking type was applied for the high-speed driving at the beginning, and the air spring bogie was applied to the 10 pieces of the special passenger car made in Hyundai Precision in 1982. There was a standard room, a dining room car, a separate room car, a restaurant combination room special car and a prospective coach car. A rectangular car was operated by the Saemaul Arirang Yoram train, which operated on December 31, 2007. All were retired.

=== Streamlined carriage ===
The second-generation train was introduced with the 7000-train locomotive from 1986 to 1988. The length of the car was increased from 21m to 23.5m and the seat was increased to 64 seats. To make the seat more spacious. One of the differences compared to the first-generation passenger car is that the existing spring cushion is replaced with a cotton cushion, an armrest is added to the center, and a folding table is installed on both ends of the armrest. In addition, automatic cabin door which existed only in a rectangular cabin was applied to all rooms, and the automatic door was installed for the first time in Korea. Indirect lighting was adopted for the first time, and individual reading lights were installed.

However, due to differences in service quality with long - haul carriages, streamlined carriages were downgraded to full - size cabins in Mugunghwa in 1993, and were then downgraded to ordinary rooms. Since 1996, he has begun to renovate a streamlined carriage with headrests and legless seats. In the process of retrofitting, all backrests without headrests have disappeared, but the replacement of heat sinks for heating is not possible. There was a LED signboard inside the room together with the same type of Saemaulho which was produced and introduced in 1988 but it was temporarily incompatible with the same type Saemaulho which was produced and introduced in 1992, The publisher was changed to be compatible with the production and introduction vehicles of 1992.

=== Long carriage ===
It was introduced from 1990 to 1999, and it is a new type of cabin that the room facilities were changed greatly compared to the previous vehicles. It raised the service space of washrooms and toilets to a considerable level, and provided instantaneous coolers, water heaters and drinking water. Since then, there has been room for the installation of mobile public telephones. The bathroom had no opaque glass windows (completely closed with no windows), and the entrance door was the same as the room interior. The seat was transformed from a conventional brown sheet to a purple sheet with a luxurious pattern, and a LED signboard was placed on the door of the room to display various information as captions. He also operated a smoking room. In 1991, the carriage was installed and installed on the outside of the door. 45-seater coach cars also appeared and operated on the Gyeongbu Line. Since 1991, they were no longer producing or introducing them.

The body was the same as the stainless steel bodywork of the Saemaul Autonomous Vehicle. The painting was the first painting of the Saemaul Autumn Vehicle with a red line on the window. The letters on the LED display board in the car were greenish-green, with a unique font, and the letter size accounted for two-thirds of the display board. In the process of unification with the coloring of Korean railway, both of the carriage type and the homogeneous type were replaced with a relatively ordinary one and disappeared.

An electric water heater was installed in the washroom in the service area, but water temperature was freely controlled. On December 3, 1999, a fire caused by a short circuit in Noryangjin Station resulted in the burning of one car (524) in the early 2000s. . The bathroom shelf was originally a sink and flower arrangement, which was demolished due to administrative difficulties. On the opposite side of the sink, a portable wireless public telephone operated by Korea Mobile Communications, which was piloted in 1994 and expanded to all vehicles in 1995, was installed, and personal phones were rapidly spread and demolished in the 2000s. At present, there is a button-type drinking water bottle with a disposable paper cup at the place where there is an air pressure gauge and a trash can, In the 2000s, all LED devices were demolished and video broadcasting equipment (KOMONET) was installed in the car-shaped Saemaul rivers. In February 2008, due to the condition of broadcasting companies, broadcasting was suspended and the middle monitor was removed. And it became ineffective.

==== Suite carriage ====
Special-sized carriages have the same specifications as regular rooms, except that the capacity is 60 persons.

In addition to the number of seats, the illumination of the individual lighting can be adjusted, the installation of personal audio equipment by the program, and the retractable legrest (calf rest) existed.

Among the suites, a 2x1 arrayed passenger carriage also operated.

All doors are automatic doors from the beginning of the introduction, and are equipped with a non-acid washroom and a restroom.

In addition, various tourist trains operate in the form of collecting fares and fees for the Saemaeul Special Zone, and use vehicles such as the Mugunghwa Hana Nuri, or the small-lorry and commuter-type diesel vehicles.

=== Remodeled carriage ===
In January 2013, Korail have remodeled the remaining carriages after the demolition of the Saemaul-type diesel hydraulic car. Since 1992, the specification is almost the same as the large Saemaeulho. Conventional streamlined and long-haul carriages have no jumper lines in the same vehicle type, so it was impossible to operate them into homogeneous groups. On the contrary, these coaches were not able to operate as coaches that were connected to locomotives. Therefore, remodeling work was done to connect carriages with locomotives and to mix with other carriage types.

=== Mugunghwa-ho remodeled carriage ===
Since the durability of streamline passenger cars and convertible passenger coaches has expired at the end of April 30, 2018, except for the vehicles modified to the Mugunghwa Special Passenger Units and the three cars introduced in 1999. They were introduced from May 1, 2018. The Limit carriage of Mugunghwa coaches was remodeled and the same color scheme as the ITX-Saemaeul was adopted. The seating capacity is 72 seats, and each seat has a 220V outlet and a USB charging terminal.

== Related culture ==
=== Social status ===
Until the first KTX rating was established on April 1, 2004, the Saemaeul-ho was responsible for the highest grade train, and the Saemaeul-ho had a very high social status. Especially in the early 1960s and 1970s, it was recognized that VIPs or wealthy people were passengers on the train.

=== Restaurant Car ===
In 1969, at the time of the introduction of the tourism lake, the dining car was operated under the name "SALON". It was first run by the Korean National Railroad, and in 1986, the outsourcing commissioned privatization of the outskirts, and the Seoul Plaza Hotel was operated by the Saemaeul-ho and Mugunghwa-ho restaurants until March 31, 2004.

Until the end of the 1990s, all the Saemaeul-ho (plus some Mugunghwa-ho) except for some weekend trains were connected to the dining car. However, in 1999, since the restaurant was removed from the Saemaul rivers in Janghang, . In the 2000s, some non-mealtime trains operated the Lotteria in the dining room car instead of the dining room. From July 2003, the Seoul Plaza Hotel returned the diner car operation of the train at the non-meal time, As a consortium.

There was one chef, one manager, and one or two serving on the dining car. The chef supervised the cooking, the manager supervised the cash register, and the staff in charge of the service performed the service in the dining room and sold the lunch box or the room moving room. In the car, they sold lunch boxes, Western food, Korean food, liquor Many problems have been pointed out, such as high prices compared to the quality of trains operated on trains, the problem of detecting E. coli that was reported to the press if forgotten, and the use of factory products containing retort and cans in some menus such as curry rice.

Since April 1, 2004, KTX was opened and the number of passengers using the dining room was reduced, and Seoul Plaza Hotel returned the operating rights of the dining car to run the lunch bar. Although the dining car stopped operating on trains except for some meals for about two years immediately after the opening of KTX, the restaurant car was connected to all trains again from 2006. However, as most of the Saemaulng visitors were using KTX, the number of passengers in the dining room naturally decreased. In 2008, the dining car was abolished and reorganized into a train cafe.

Train cafes sell lunches, sandwiches, confectionery, drinks, liquors and soups. There are cell phone rapid chargers, game machines and computers, mini concert rooms and therapy rooms. On May 7, 2012, KORAIL Tourism Development Co., Ltd. introduced rail lock, which is a train-only lunch box, and sold the rail lock instead of the existing lunch box in the Saemaeul-ho train cafe.

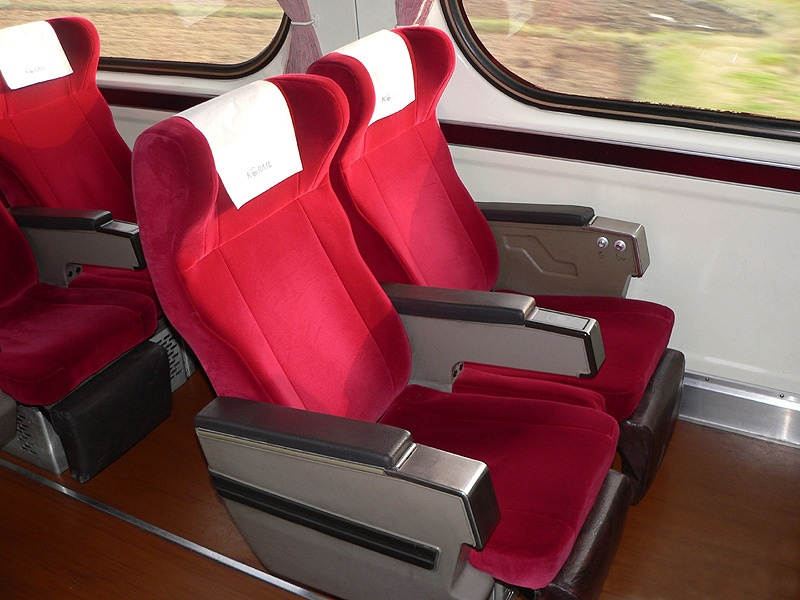
Seat for Saemaeul-ho normal class

== Lines served ==
- Janghang Line: Yongsan-Iksan
- Mokpo–Boseong Line: Mokpo-Bujeon

=== Former operations ===
- Honam Line: Yongsan-Mokpo / Gwangju
- Gyeongbu Line: Seoul-Busan
- Gyeongjeon Line: Seoul-Jinju
- Jungang line: Cheongnyangni-Andong
- Yeongdong Line: Cheongnyangni-Gangneung
- Donghae Nambu Line: Seoul-Pohang / Bujeon
- Jeolla Line: Yongsan-Yeosu-Expo
- Gyeongui Line: Seoul-Dorasan
- Jinhae Line: Dongdaegu-Jinhae

== Notable accidents ==
=== Three consecutive fatal collision accidents ===
On May 1, 2002, Saemaeul-ho #162, from Yeosu (now Yeosu Expo), to Seoul through the Jeolla Line, Honam Line and Gyeongbu Line, ran over three people in total, each person in each different railroad crossing, three times in a row. The first accident happened 26 minutes after departure from Yeosu Station (now Yeosu Expo station), at a railroad crossing nearby Yulchon Station. #162 ran over an 81-year-old female. After changing its engineer, #162 continued its journey to Seoul. However at 13:00 KST, #162 collided with an 82-year-old female, at the in-station railway bridge at Samnye Station. Yet again replacing its engineer, #162 entered the Honam Line, continuing to Seoul. But only 40 minutes after the second incident, #162 killed a third person, a 90-year-old male, at a railroad crossing nearby Hamyeol Station. In South Korea, many press reported it as "Three consecutive railroad crossing accidents" (Korean: 3연속 건널목 사망 사고). It was the first such accident in the world, according to KORAIL at that time. The train arrived at Seoul 36 minutes late, and immediately after its arrival, KORAIL held a requiem ceremony for the three victims in these accidents.

== See also ==
- Korail
- Mugunghwa-ho
- KTX
- Rail transport in South Korea
- Transport in South Korea

== Gallery ==
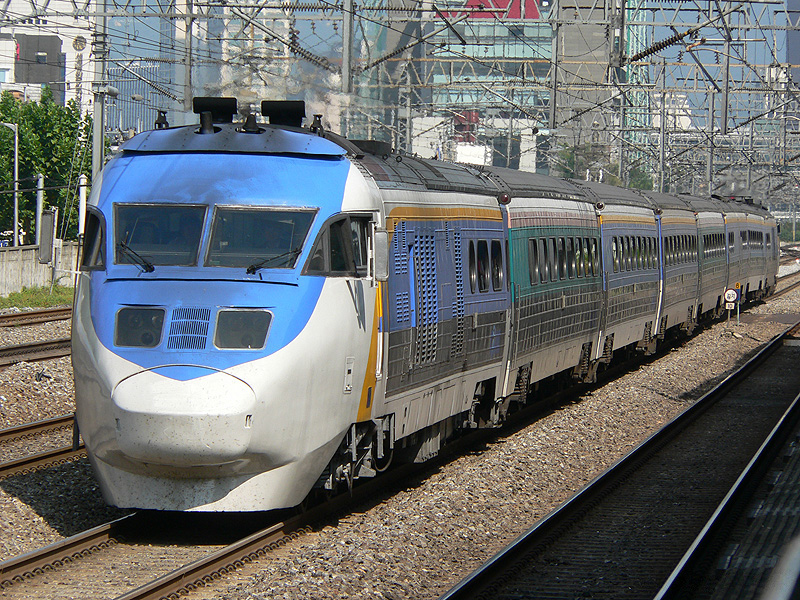
Saemaeul-ho type diesel hydraulic pressure vehicle (Retired)

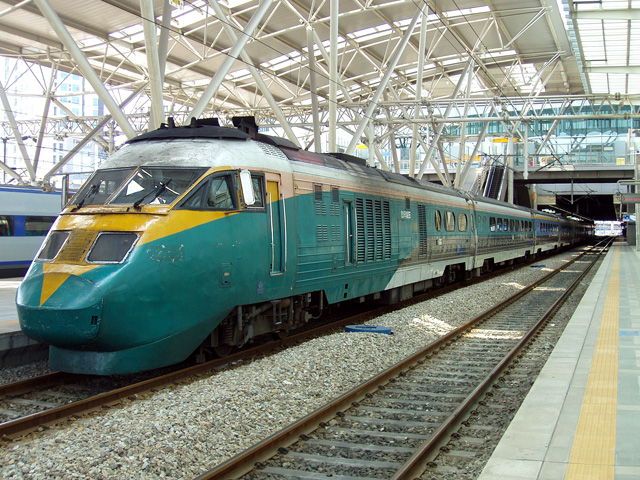
Saemaeul-ho type diesel hydraulic pressure vehicle (old paint)

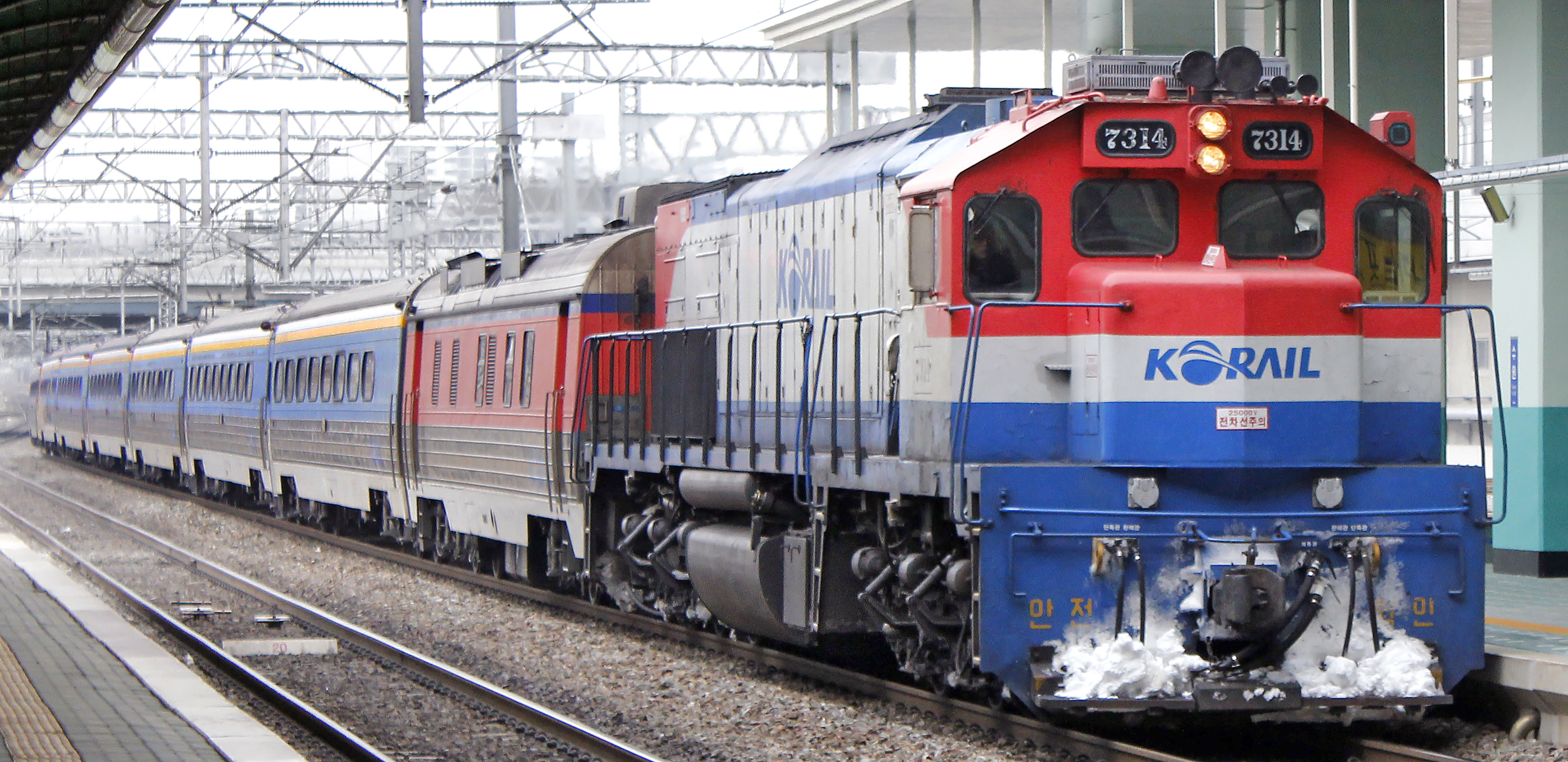
Diesel locomotives trains Car-type Saemaeul-ho (End of service, but occasionally group tour train or occasional temporary train)

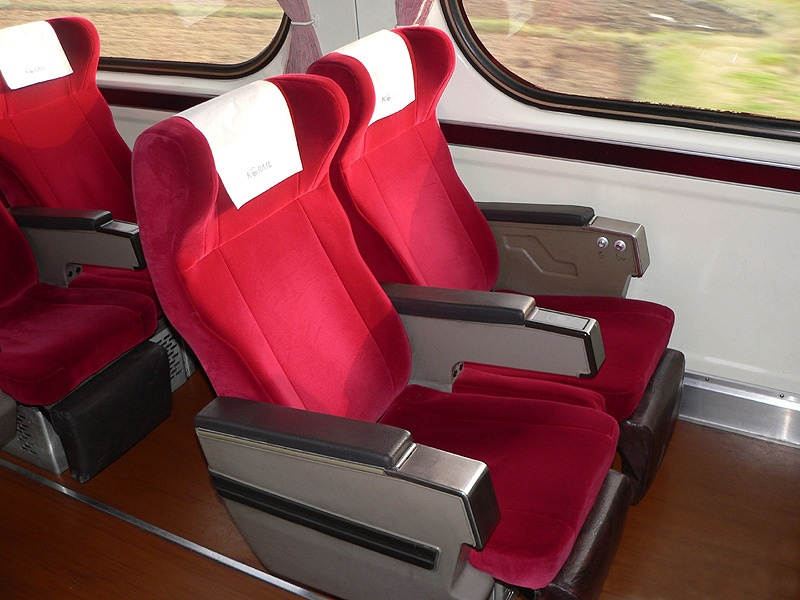
Saemaeul-ho Exp. Normal Seat

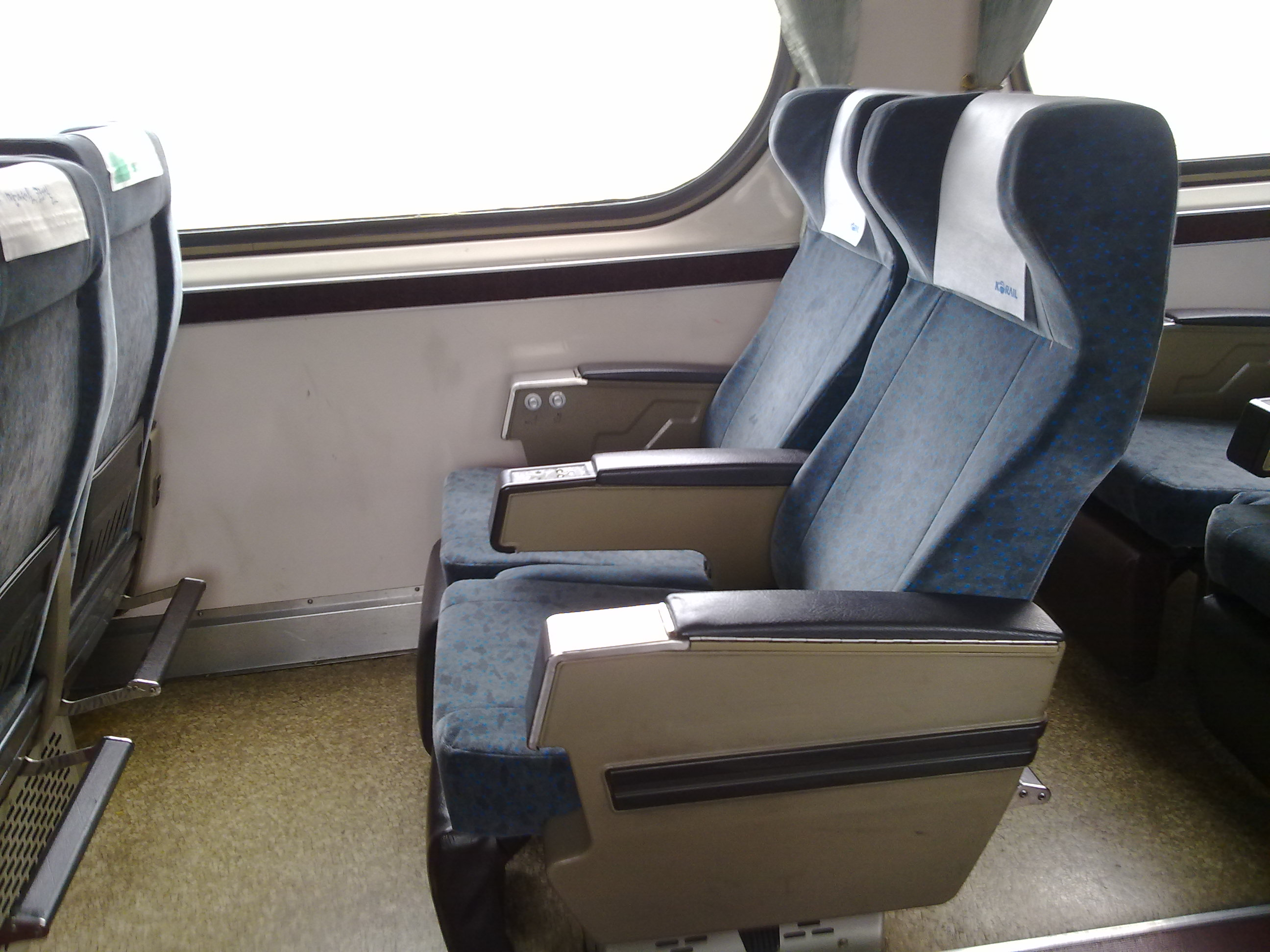
Saemaeul-seat-pitch-interval

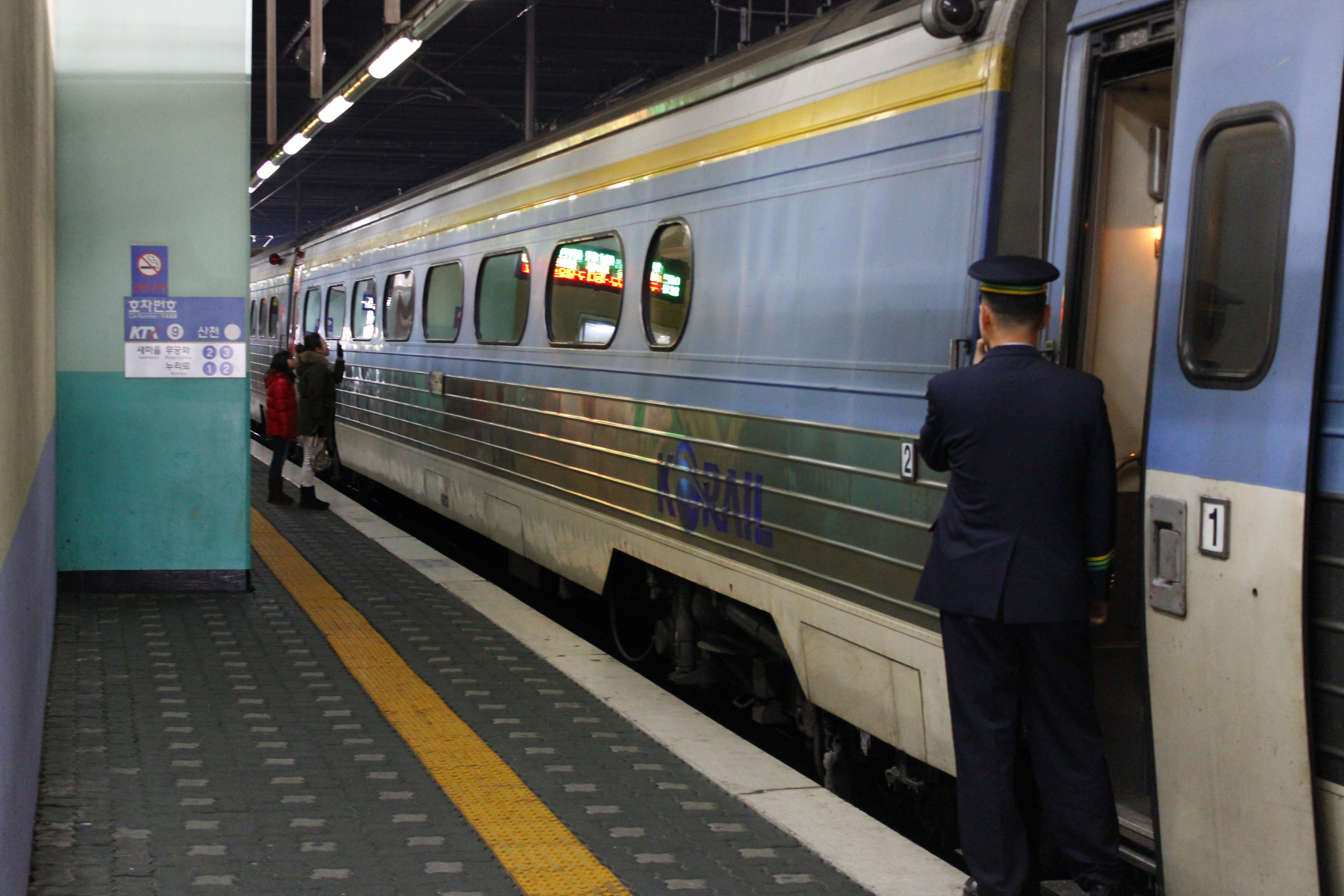
Saemaeul-ho Express Push-Pull DHC Railcar Last run

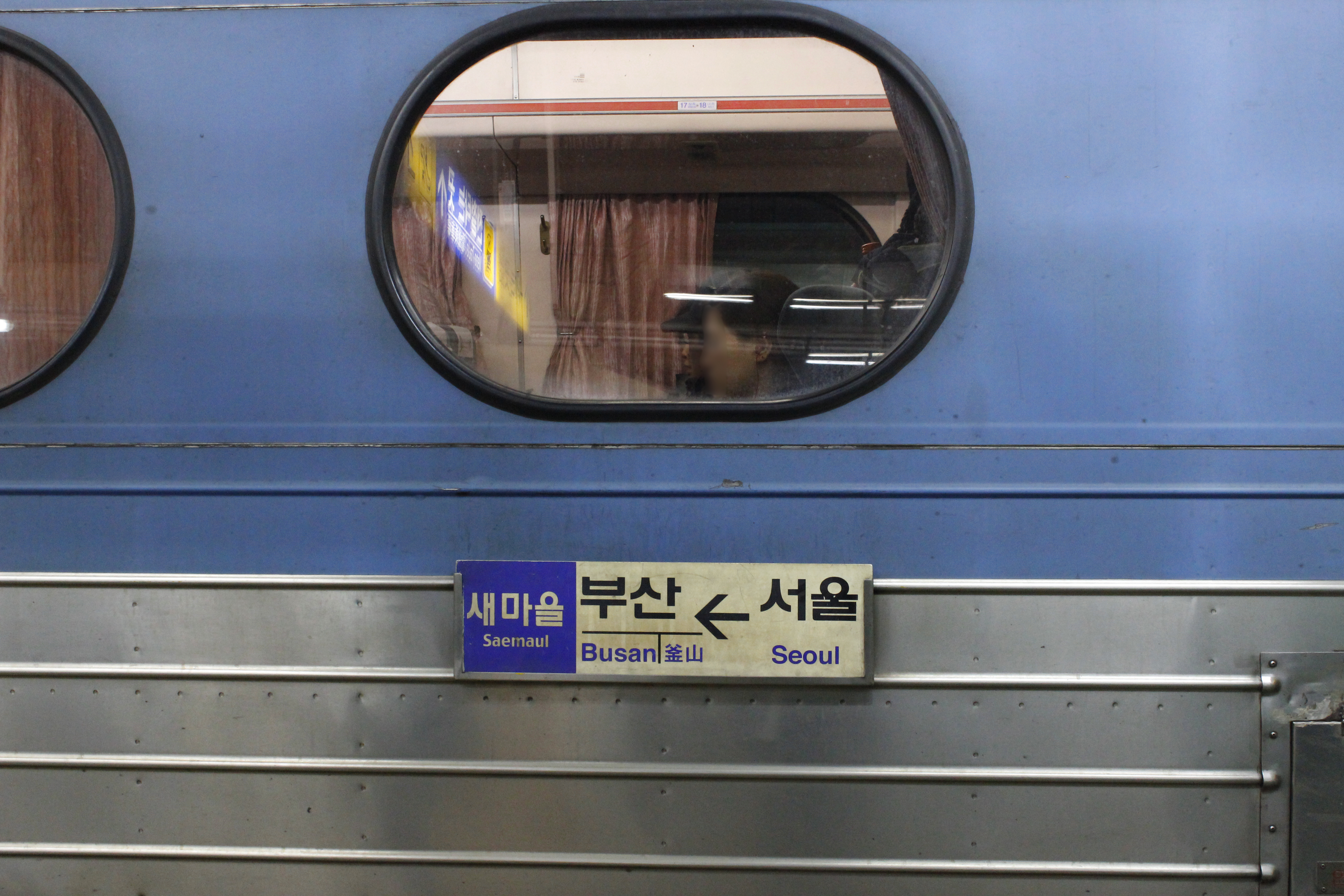
Traveling on a Saemaeul-ho from Seoul to Busan. (At the end of service)

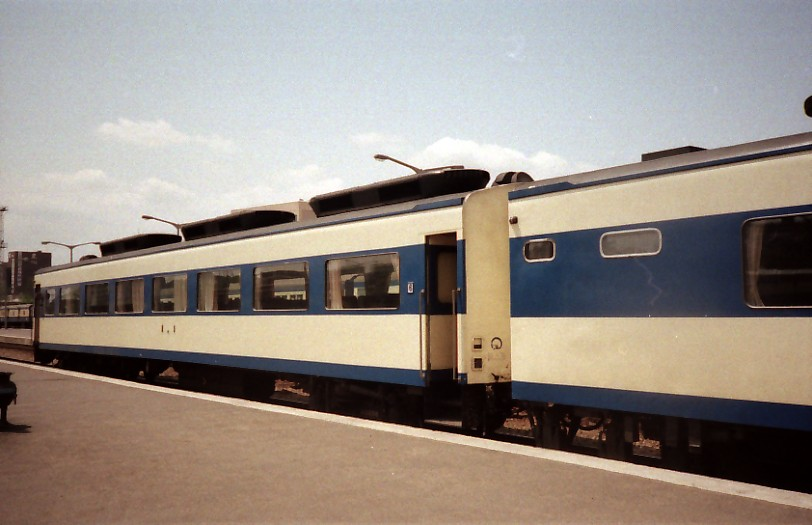
Rectangular carriage

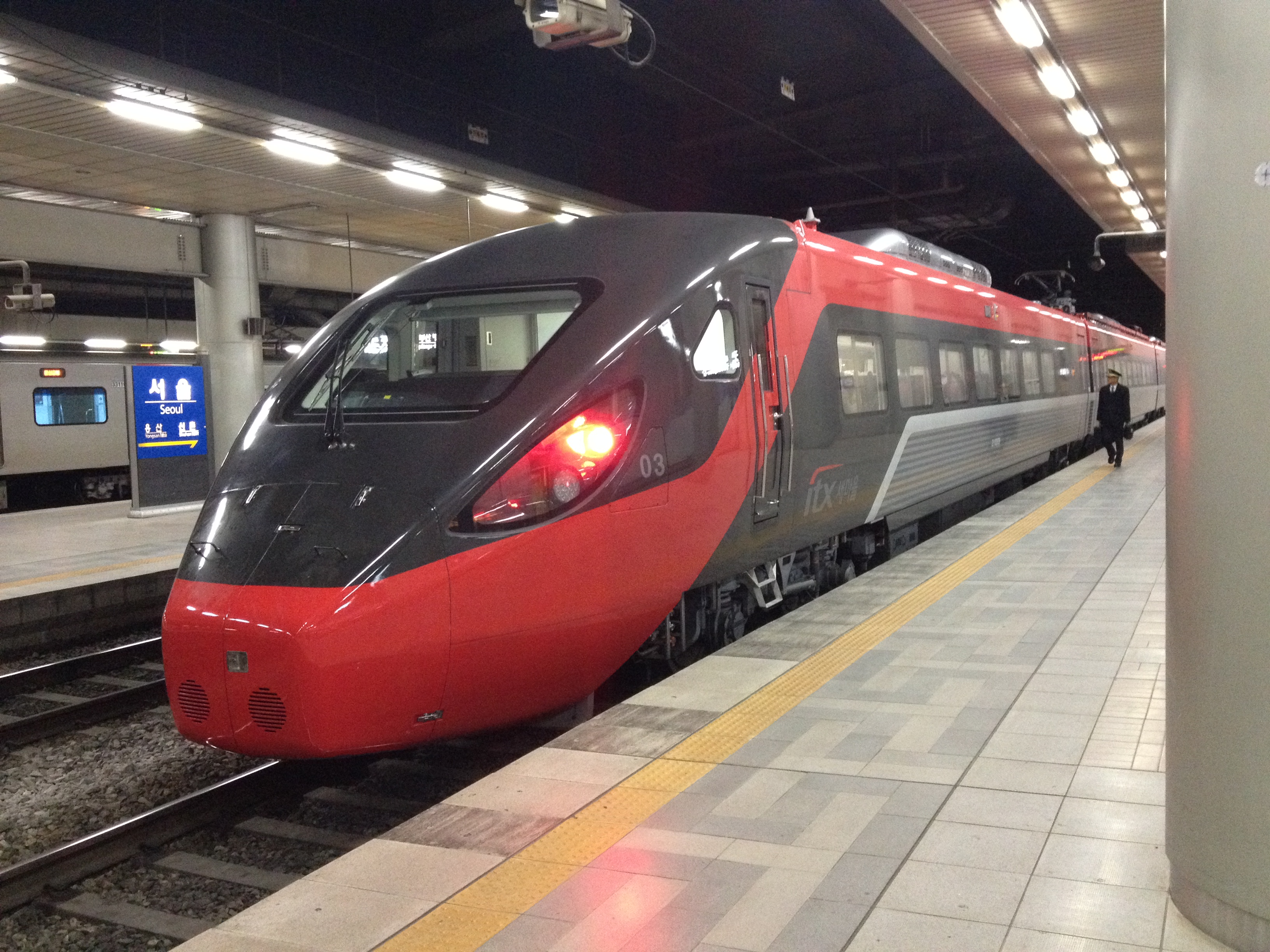
ITX-Saemaeul Train

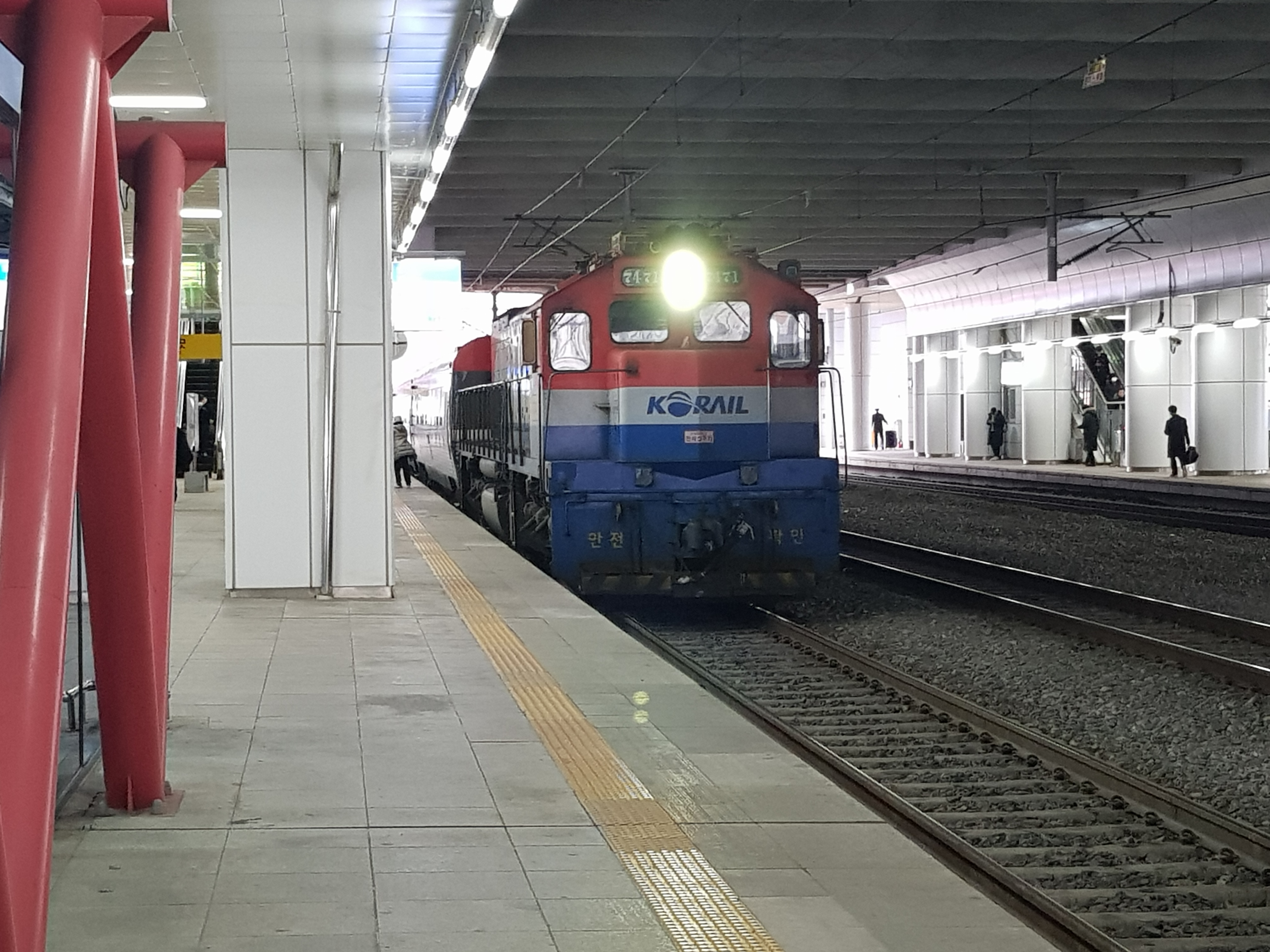
Mugunghwa Train Modification Saemaeul Train
