= Gaya Line =

Railway line in South Korea

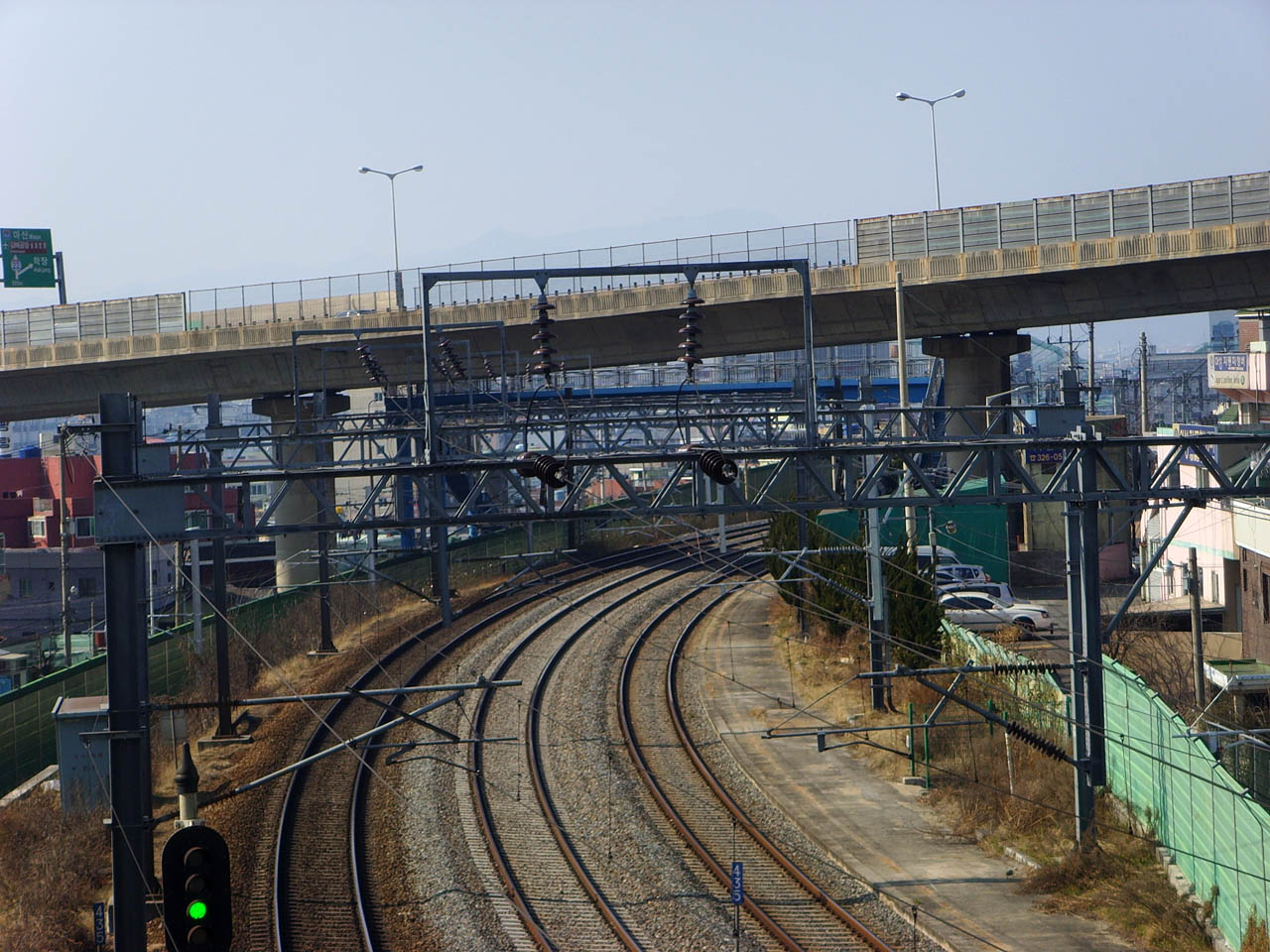
- The Gaya Line at Jurye Station

Overview
- Other names: Busan Jochajang Line 부산조차장선 (釜山操車場線)
- Native name: 가야선 (伽倻線)
- Status: Operational
- Owner: Chosen Government Railway (1944–1945); Korea Rail Network Authority (since 1945)
- Locale: Busan Gwangyeoksi
- Termini: Sasang; Beomil

Service
- Type: Heavy rail, Passenger & freight rail Regional rail
- Operator(s): Chosen Government Railway (1944–1945); Korail

History
- Opened: 10 June 1944

Technical
- Line length: 8.3 km (5.2 mi)
- Track gauge: 1,435 mm (4 ft 8 1/2 in) standard gauge

- Gaya Line
- Hangul: 가야선
- Hanja: 伽倻線
- RR: Gayaseon
- MR: Kayasŏn

The Gaya Line is a railway line of Korail in Busan Metropolitan City, South Korea, connecting Sasang on the Gyeongbu Line with Beom-il on the Donghae Line via Gaya, where the line also connects to the Bujeon Line.

== History ==
The 8.3 km (5.2 mi) line was originally opened by the Chosen Government Railway on 10 June 1944 as the Busan Marshalling Yard Line between Sasang and Busanjin; after the end of the Pacific War and the subsequent partition of Korea the line was taken over by the Korean National Railroad, which renamed it Gaya Line on 1 September 1955. On 21 January 1968 the line's terminus was changed from Busanjin to Beom-il.

On 2 December 2002 commuter passenger service on the line was discontinued, and on the 28th electrification and double-tracking of the line was completed.

== Route ==
Distance (Total; km)	Distance (S2S; km)	Station Name (Transcribed)	Station Name (Hangeul (Hanja))	Former name (Transcribed)	Former name (Hangeul (Hanja))	Connections
0.0	0.0	Sasang	사상 (沙上)			Gyeongbu Line; Busan Subway Line 2
5.1	3.2	Gaya	가야 (伽倻)			Bujeon Line; Busan Subway Line 2
8.3	3.2	Beomil	범일 (凡一)			Donghae Line; Busan Subway Line 1
