= Gyeongju station (1918–2021) =

Railway station in Gyeongju

경주
Gyeongju
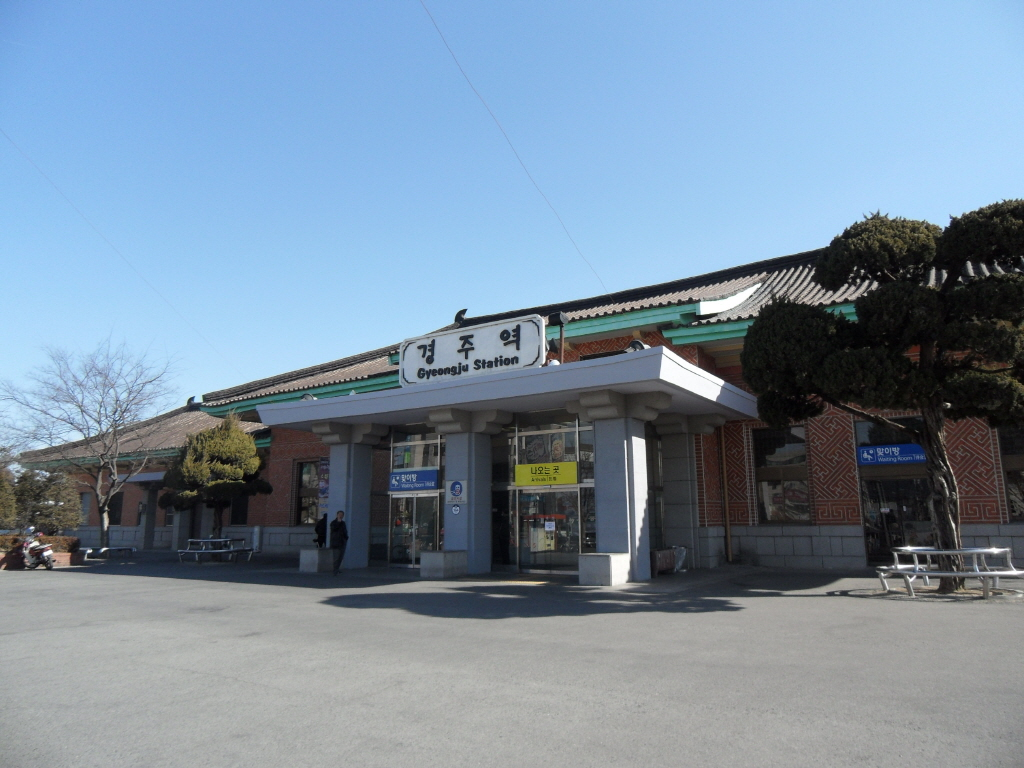

Korean name
- Hangul: 경주역
- Hanja: 慶州驛
- Revised Romanization: Gyeongjuyeok
- McCune–Reischauer: Kyŏngjuyŏk

General information
- Location: Seongdong-dong, Gyeongju, North Gyeongsang; South Korea
- Coordinates: 35°50′39″N 129°13′05″E
- Operator: Korail
- Lines: Donghae Line, Jungang Line

Construction
- Structure type: Aboveground

History
- Opened: November 1, 1918
- Closed: December 28, 2021
Location

Gyeongju station was a railway station in the city of Gyeongju. It was on the Jungang Line and the Donghae Line.
