= Sinhaeundae station =

Railway station in Busan, South Korea

신해운대
Sinhaeundae
신해운대; Sinhaeundae
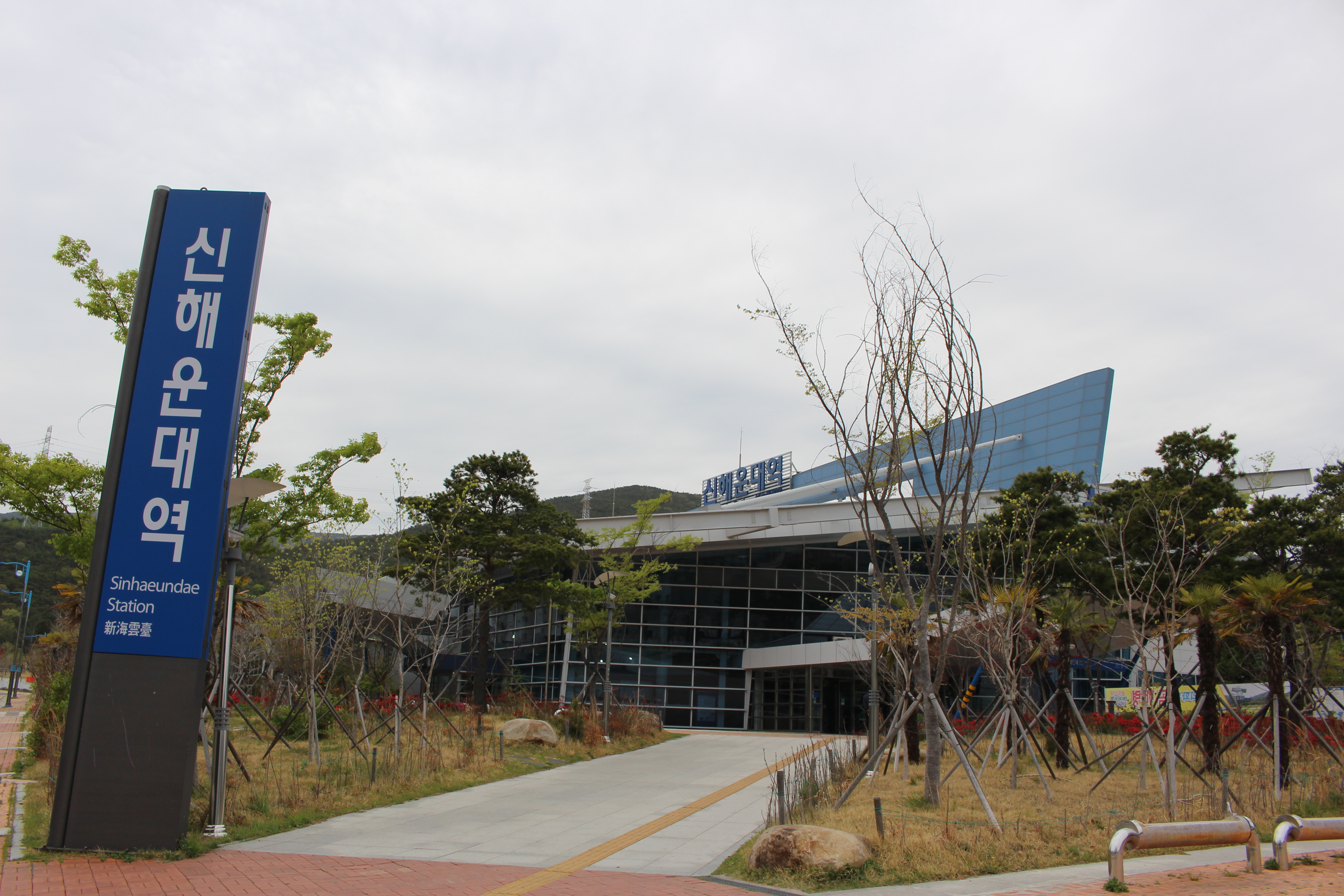
- Station building

Korean name
- Hangul: 신해운대역
- Hanja: 新海雲臺驛
- Revised Romanization: Sinhaeundaeyeok
- McCune–Reischauer: Sinhaeundaeyŏk

General information
- Location: 427 Jangsan-ro, Haeundae-gu, Busan; Republic of Korea
- Coordinates: 35°10′54.0264″N 129°10′37.5132″E
- Operator: Korail
- Line: Donghae Line
- Platforms: 2
- Tracks: 4
- Connections: Bus station

Construction
- Structure type: Semi-underground

History
- Opened: July 15, 1934
- Former names: Haeundae

Services
Preceding station	Busan Metro	Following station
BEXCO towards Bujeon	Donghae Line	Songjeong towards Taehwagang
Regional services
Preceding station	Korea Train Express	Following station
Gijang towards Seoul	Jungang KTX	Centum towards Bujeon
Preceding station	Korail	Following station
Gijang towards Cheongnyangni	ITX-Maum Jungang Line	Centum towards Bujeon
Gijang towards Dongdaegu	ITX-Maum Donghae Line	Centum towards Bujeon
Gijang towards Gangneung	ITX-Maum Donghae Line	Centum towards Bujeon
Gijang towards Pohang	Mugunghwa-ho Donghae Line	Centum towards Bujeon
Gijang towards Dongdaegu	Mugunghwa-ho Donghae Line	Centum towards Bujeon
Location

Sinhaeundae station (Korean: 신해운대역; Hanja: 新海雲臺驛) is a railway station of the Donghae Line in Jwa-dong, Haeundae-gu, Busan, the Republic of Korea. The new station is situated in the Haeundae New Town (Jwa-dong) district, about 20 to 25 minutes by bus from the Haeundae Station of Busan Metro and actually nearer to the Jangsan Station also on Line 2. The Haeundae KORAIL station was relocated to its new location on December 2, 2013. As of December 18, 2017, the name "Sinhaeundae Station" (Korean: 신해운대역; Hanja: 新海雲臺驛) is used in signage, tickets and train announcements.

== Former Haeundae station ==
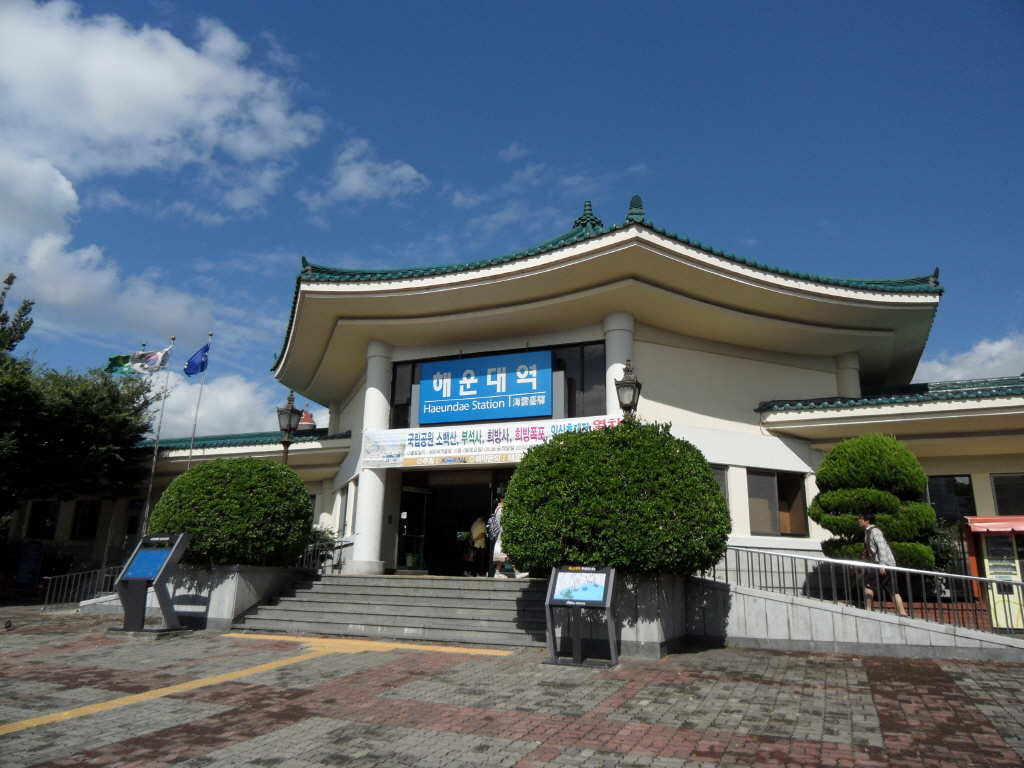
Former station

The former station placed at 621, Haeun-daero, Haeundae-gu, Busan, Republic of Korea. This area will change to a park for Haeundae people.

== Station layout ==
G	Entrances and Exits
L1; Concourse	Lobby	Customer service, shops, vending machines, ATMs
L2; Platforms	Northbound	Mugunghwa-ho toward Dongdaegu or Pohang (Gijang) →
L2; Platforms	Island platform, doors open on the left
L2; Platforms	Northbound	Donghae toward Taehwagang (Songjeong) →
L2; Platforms	Southbound	← Donghae toward Bujeon (BEXCO)
L2; Platforms	Island platform, doors open on the left
L2; Platforms	Southbound	← Mugunghwa-ho toward Bujeon (Centum)
