= Korail Class 381000 =

South Korean train

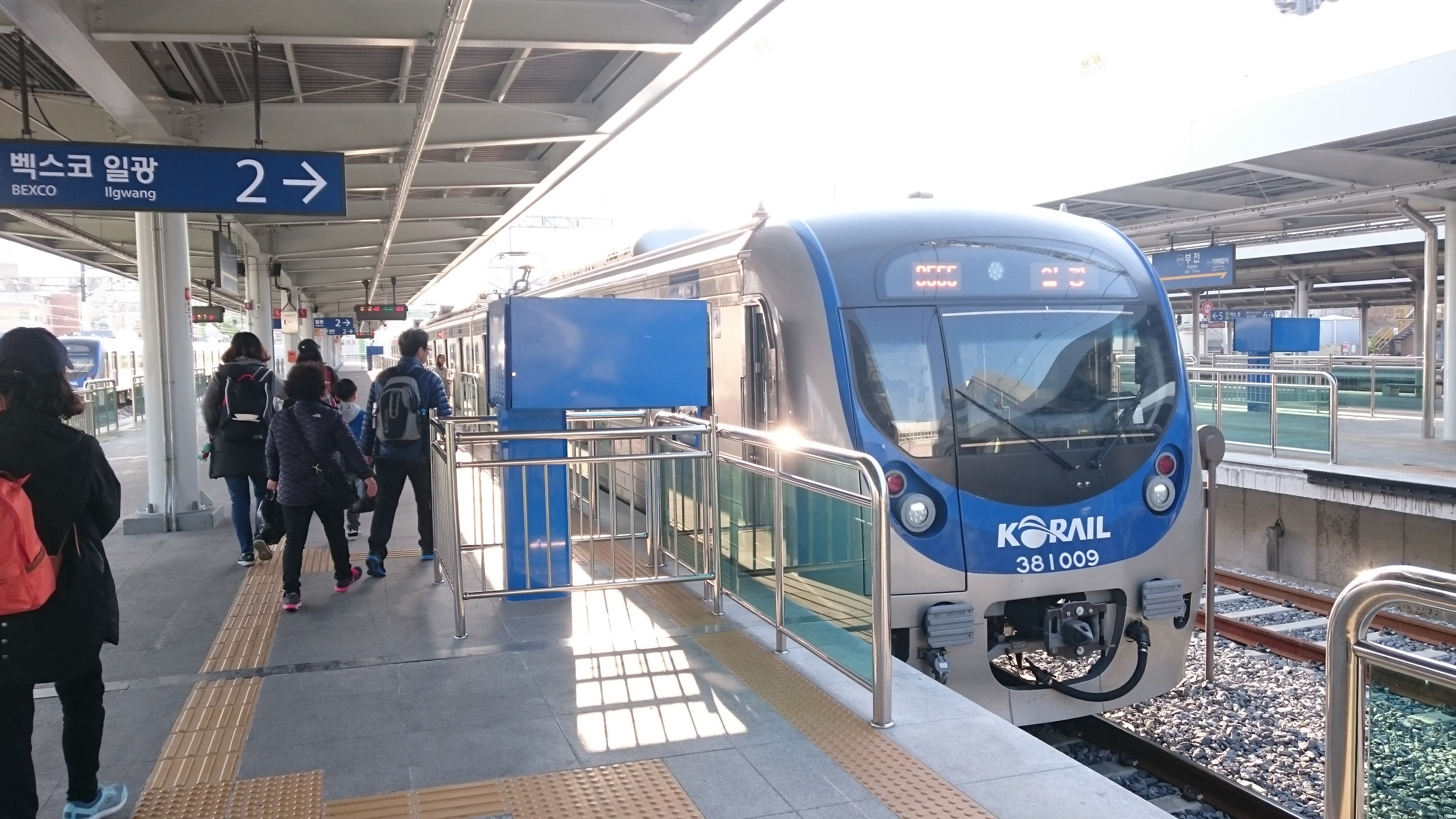
- Class 381000 train 381009 at Bujeon.
- In service: 2016-onwards
- Manufacturer: Hyundai Rotem
- Constructed: 2016 (1st generation), 2018 (2nd generation)
- Formation: 4 cars per train TC-M'-M'-TC
- Operator: KORAIL
- Depots: Donghae, Munsan
- Lines served: Donghae Line (381000); DMZ Peace Link Train

Specifications
- Car body construction: Aluminum
- Doors: 4 per side, 8 per car
- Maximum speed: 110 km/h (68 mph) (service); 120 km/h (75 mph) (design)
- Traction system: Toshiba COVO52-A0 VVVF-IGBT propulsion system using IGBT 1C4M motors
- Power output: 4,400 kW (5,900 hp)
- Acceleration: 3.0 km/(h⋅s) (1.9 mph/s)
- Deceleration: 3.5 km/(h⋅s) (2.2 mph/s) (service); 4.5 km/(h⋅s) (2.8 mph/s) (emergency)
- Electric system: 25 kV 60 Hz AC
- Current collection: Overhead
- Safety systems: ATS, ATP (Ansaldo), ATC
- Coupling system: Shibata-type
- Track gauge: 1,435 mm (4 ft 8 1/2 in)

The Korail Class 381000 trains are commuter electric multiple units in South Korea used on the Donghae Line and the DMZ Peace Link Train.

== Generations ==
=== 1st generation (381x01 ~ 381x10) ===
- Produced by: Hyundai Rotem Changwon Plant.
- Introduction: March 3, 2016 to August 20, 2016

=== 2nd generation (381x11 ~ 381x17) ===
- Produced by: Hyundai Rotem Changwon Plant.
- Introduction: July 27, 2018 to December 20, 2018

== See also ==
- Korail
- Donghae Line
- DMZ Peace Link Train
