= Busanjin Station =

Busanjin Station (Korean: 부산진역; Hanja: 釜山鎭驛) is a railroad stations in Busan, South Korea.

- Busanjin Station (Korail)
- Busanjin Station (Busan Metro)
