= Jaesong station =

Train station in Busan, South Korea

재송; Jaesong
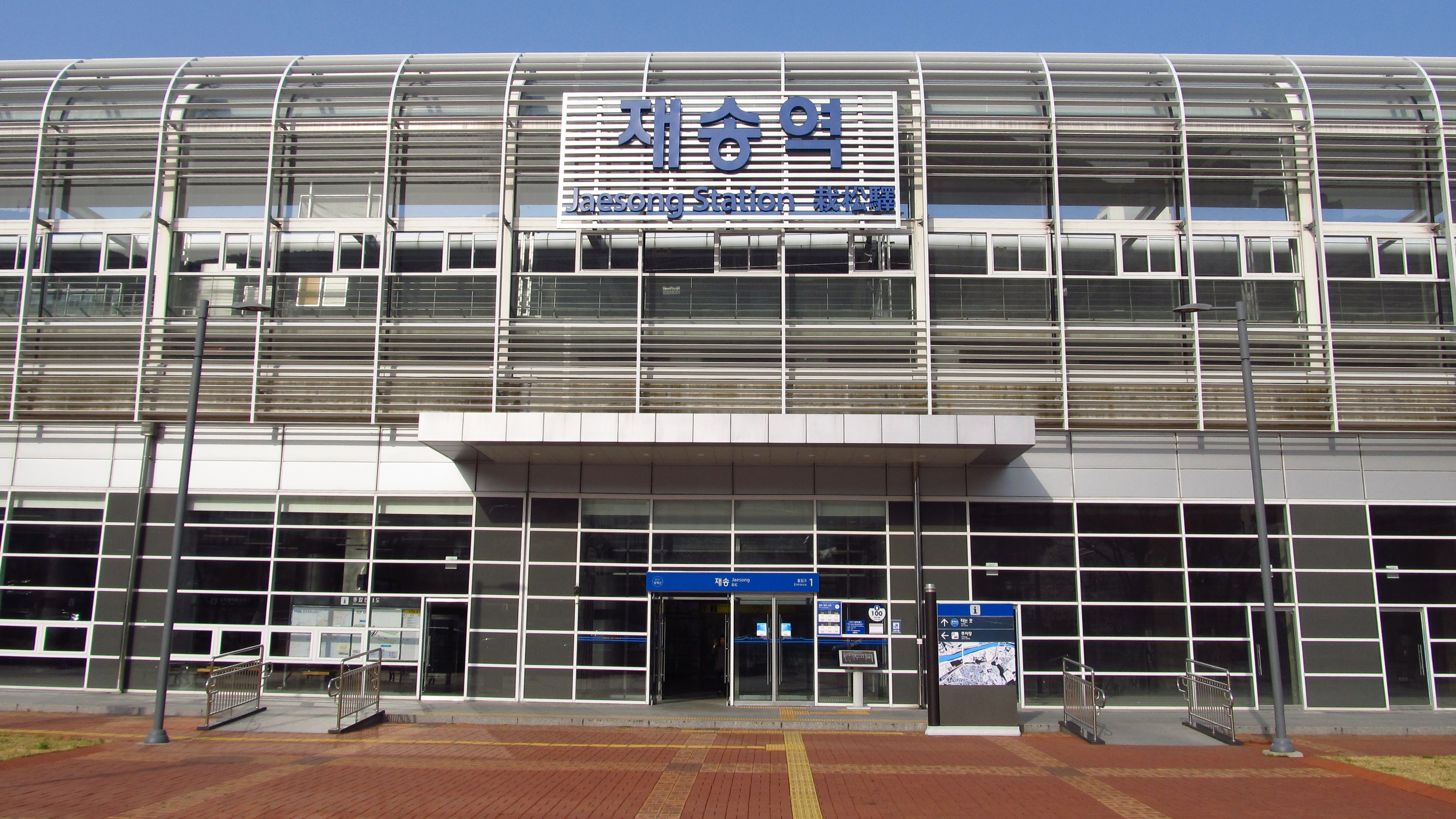

Korean name
- Hangul: 재송역
- Hanja: 栽松驛
- Revised Romanization: Jaesong yeok
- McCune–Reischauer: Chaesong yŏk

General information
- Location: Jaesong-dong, Haeundae District, Busan; South Korea
- Coordinates: 35°11′22.33″N 129°7′12.37″E
- Operator: Korail
- Line: Donghae Line
- Platforms: 2
- Tracks: 2

Construction
- Structure type: Aboveground

History
- Opened: August 16, 1989

Services
Preceding station	Busan Metro	Following station
Busanwondong towards Bujeon	Donghae Line	Centum towards Taehwagang
Location

Jaesong station (Korean: 재송역) is a railway station of the Donghae Line in Jaesong-dong, Haeundae District, Busan, South Korea.

== Station layout ==
L2; Platforms	Side platform, doors will open on the right
L2; Platforms	Northbound	Donghae toward Taehwagang (Centum) →
L2; Platforms	Southbound	← Donghae toward Bujeon (Busanwondong)
L2; Platforms	Side platform, doors will open on the right

L1; Concourse	Lobby	Customer service, shops, vending machines, ATMs

G	Street level	Exit
