= Centum station =

Train station in South Korea

센텀
Centum
센텀; Centum
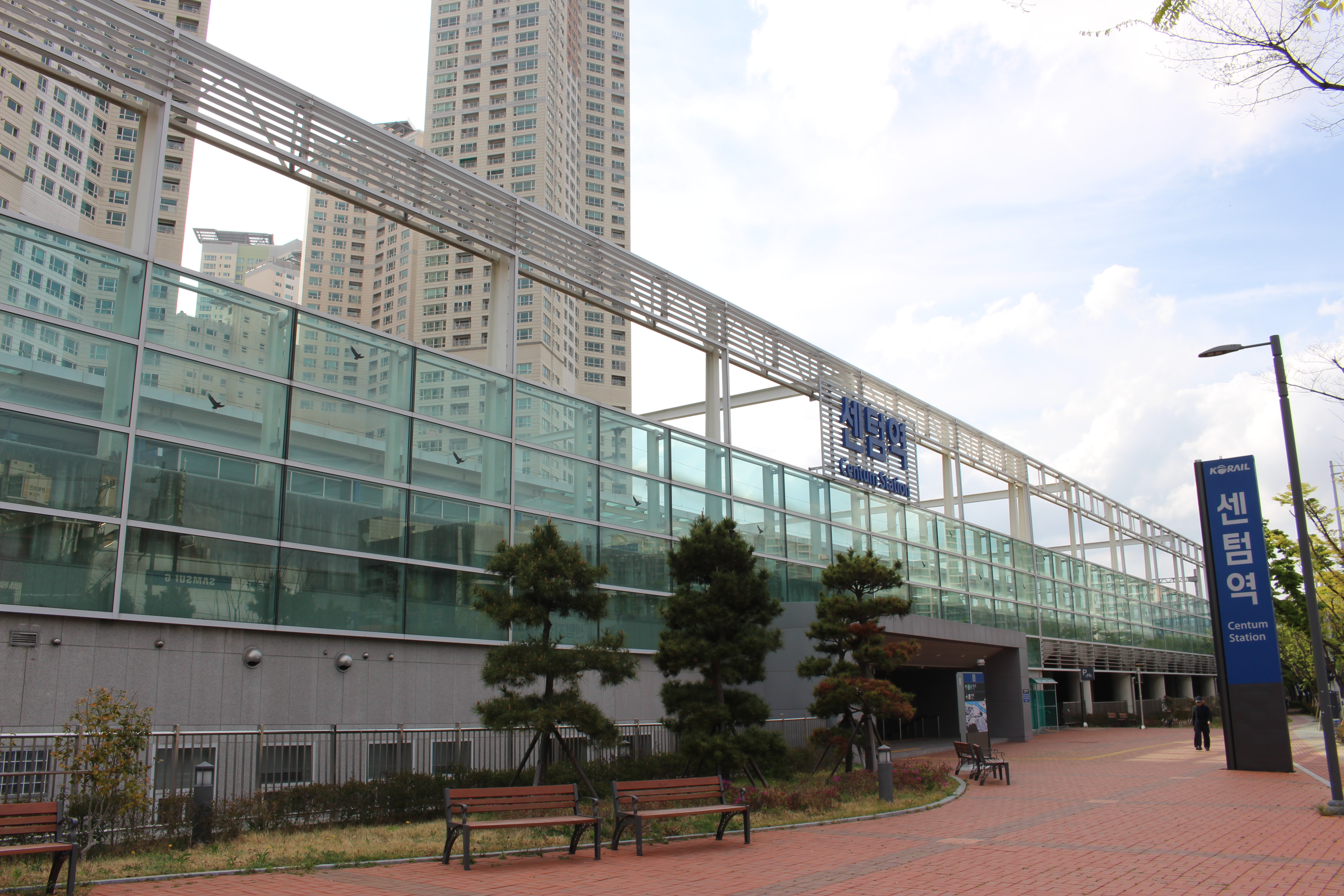

Korean name
- Hangul: 센텀역
- Hanja: 센텀驛
- Revised Romanization: Senteom-yeok
- McCune–Reischauer: Sent'ŏm-yŏk

General information
- Location: U-dong, Haeundae District, Busan; South Korea
- Coordinates: 35°10′45.0″N 129°7′29.9″E
- Operator: Korail
- Line: Donghae Line
- Platforms: 2
- Tracks: 8

Construction
- Structure type: Aboveground

History
- Opened: July 15, 1935
- Former names: Suyeong

Services
Preceding station	Busan Metro	Following station
Jaesong towards Bujeon	Donghae Line	BEXCO towards Taehwagang
Regional services
Preceding station	Korea Train Express	Following station
Sinhaeundae towards Seoul	Jungang KTX	Bujeon Terminus
Preceding station	Korail	Following station
Sinhaeundae towards Cheongnyangni	ITX-Maum Jungang Line	Bujeon Terminus
Sinhaeundae towards Dongdaegu	ITX-Maum Donghae Line	Bujeon Terminus
Sinhaeundae towards Gangneung	ITX-Maum Donghae Line	Bujeon Terminus
Sinhaeundae towards Pohang	Mugunghwa-ho Donghae Line	Bujeon Terminus
Sinhaeundae towards Dongdaegu	Mugunghwa-ho Donghae Line	Bujeon Terminus
Location

Centum station (Korean: 센텀역; formerly Suyeong station) is a railway station operated by Korail on the Donghae Line in U-dong, Haeundae District, Busan, South Korea. The former station name is unrelated to the station of the same name of the Busan Metro. Suyeong station was renamed to Centum station on December 30, 2016. It is also served by Mugunghwa-ho and ITX-Maum on the Donghae Line.

== Station layout ==
L2; Platforms	Northbound	Mugunghwa-ho toward Dongdaegu or Pohang (Sinhaeundae) →
L2; Platforms	Island platform, doors will open on the left, right
L2; Platforms	Northbound	Donghae toward Taehwagang (BEXCO)→
L2; Platforms	Southbound	← Donghae toward Bujeon (Jaesong)
L2; Platforms	Island platform, doors will open on the left, right
L2; Platforms	Southbound	← Mugunghwa-ho toward Bujeon (Terminus)

L1; Concourse	Lobby	Customer service, shops, vending machines, ATMs

G	Exit
