= Donghae Line =

Railway line in eastern South Korea

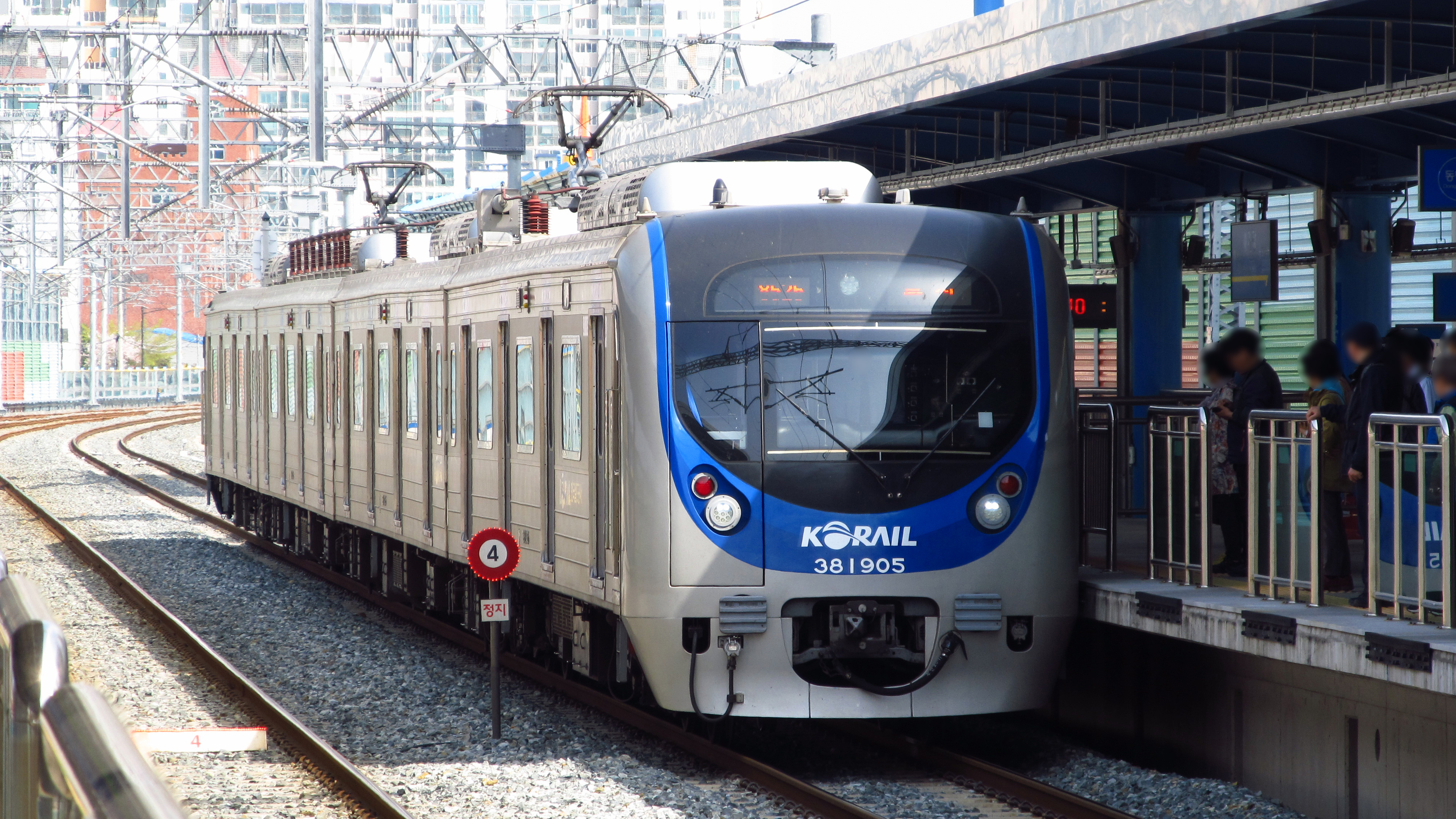
- Korail Class 381000

Overview
- Native name: 동해선 (東海線)
- Status: Operational
- Owner: Korea Rail Network Authority
- Locale: Busan; Ulsan; North Gyeongsang
- Termini: Busanjin; Samcheok
- Stations: 61

Service
- Type: Commuter rail Regional rail Intercity rail
- System: Busan Metro (Bujeon–Taehwagang)
- Operator: Korail
- Rolling stock: Hyundai Rotem Class 381000 series

History
- Opened: November 1, 1917: Chosun Light Railway Opens; July 1, 1928: Opening of the East Sea (Central) Line; April 2, 2015: Partial opening of the main line January 26, 2018: Opening of the Pohang-Yeongdeok section December 28, 2021: Bujeon to Ilgwang, Taehwagang to Mo-ryang section opened January 1, 2025: Yeongdeok to Samcheok section opened

Technical
- Line length: 310.7 km (193.1 mi)
- Num of tracks: 2 (Busanjin–Pohang); 1 (Pohang–Samcheok)
- Track gauge: 1,435 mm (4 ft 8 1/2 in) standard gauge
- Electrification: 25 kV/60 Hz AC Overhead line

Korean name
- Hangul: 동해선
- Hanja: 東海線
- RR: Donghaeseon
- MR: Tonghaesŏn
Route map
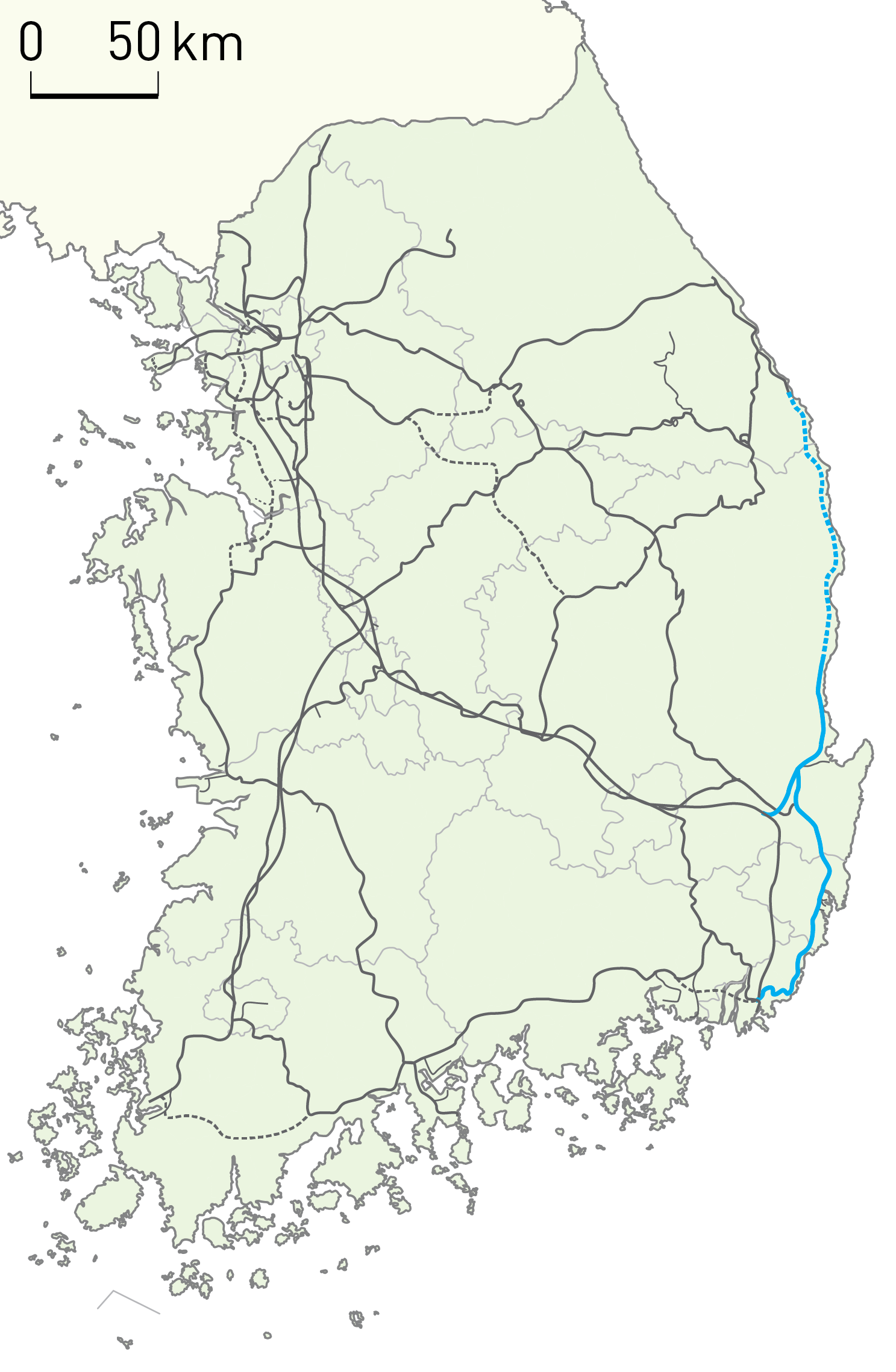

The Donghae Line (Korean: 동해선) is a railway line connecting Busanjin station to Samcheok station in South Korea. The literal meaning of its name, the "East Sea Line," reflects its position along the nation's East coast. It merged with the Donghae Nambu Line on December 30, 2016, and will merge with the Donghae Bukbu Line.

On January 26, 2018, the line was partially extended to Yeongdeok Station, and on January 1, 2025, the line between Yeongdeok Station and Samcheok Station was opened.

== Stations ==
Major stations along the line include (in order):

- Bujeon station, terminal station of the line and terminus of the Bujeon Line
- BEXCO station, where the G-Star gaming event is held
- Sinhaeundae station, a popular resort beach in eastern Busan
- Gijang station
- Taehwagang station (formerly Ulsan), major industrial city and terminus of the Jangsaengpo and Ulsanhang Lines
- Gyeongju station (Singyeongju), historic city
- Pohang station, seaport and industrial city
- Samcheok station

== Services ==
=== KTX ===
Plans foresee direct KTX high-speed train service from Seoul to Pohang and Ulsan after the completion of the upgrades. From 2015, direct KTX trains are to reach Pohang from Seoul in 1 hour 50 minutes, cutting 33 minutes from the travel time with transfer at Gyeongju. Under the government's 2010 strategic plan for 2020, the entire line may see KTX service.

=== Busan–Ulsan commuter trains ===
In the Busan–Ulsan section, higher frequency commuter rail service between Bujeon and Ilgwang began on December 30, 2016. Service operates approximately every 15 minutes during the peak periods and 30 minutes during the off-peak. The line is integrated into the Busan Metro network and accepts the Hanaro Card and Digital Busan Card, as well as the T-Money card from Seoul.

Station #	Station name	Transferable lines	Station type	Doors open
K110	Bujeon	Mugunghwa-ho &ITX-Saemaeul &ITX-MAUM, KTX-Eum services	Aboveground	Either, depending on which side the train stops
K111	Geojehaemaji		Aboveground	Left
K112	Geoje	Line 3	Aboveground	Left
K113	Busan Nat'l Univ. of Edu.	Line 1	Aboveground	Left
K114	Dongnae		Aboveground	Left
K115	Allak		Aboveground	Left
K116	Busanwondong		Aboveground	Left
K117	Jaesong		Aboveground	Left
K118	Centum	Mugunghwa-ho &ITX-MAUM services (limited service)	Aboveground	Left
K119	BEXCO	Line 2	Aboveground	Left
K120	Sinhaeundae	Mugunghwa-ho &ITX-Saemaeul &ITX-MAUM services	Semi-underground	Left
K121	Songjeong		Aboveground	Left
K122	OSIRIA		Aboveground	Left
K123	Gijang	Mugunghwa-ho &ITX-MAUM services	Aboveground	Left
K124	Ilgwang		Aboveground	Left
K125	Jwacheon		Aboveground	Left
K126	Wollae		Aboveground	Left
K127	Seosaeng		Aboveground	Left
K128	Namchang	Mugunghwa-ho &ITX-MAUM services (limited service)	Aboveground	Left
K129	Mangyang		Aboveground	Left
K130	Deokha		Aboveground	Left
K131	Gaeunpo		Aboveground	Left
K132	Taehwagang	Mugunghwa-ho &ITX-MAUM, KTX-Eum services	Aboveground	Either, depending on which side the train stops
K133	Bugulsan	Mugunghwa-ho &ITX-MAUM services		December 2026

=== Rolling stock ===
- Korail Class 381000 4-car EMU

== Upgrade ==
=== Pohang–Samcheok extension ===
At the time of thawing relations between South and North Korea, when the cross-border section of the Donghae Bukbu Line was reopened in 2007, the South Korean government considered the construction of a railway for freight traffic all along the east coast to the North Korean border. As part of the corridor, a new single-track, non-electrified line for 150 km/h (93 mph) would connect Pohang and Samcheok, the end of a branch of the Yeongdong Line. new line is to connect to the existing railhead at Samcheok. Work started on the Pohang-Yeongdeok section on March 20, 2008, with a foreseen budget of 2,949.5 billion won for the entire line until Samcheok. As of 2009, progress reached 5.9% of a planned budget reduced to 2,831.749 billion won, and completion of the 171.3 km (106.4 mi) long project was planned for 2016. Under the government's 2010 strategic plan for 2020, the Pohang–Samcheok extension is to be further upgraded for 230 km/h (140 mph).

On January 1, 2025, when the Yeongdeok Station to Samcheok Station opened, 12 stations were newly established as intermediate stations, including Yeonghae, Goraebul, Hupo, Pyeonghae, Giseong, Maehwa, Uljin, Jukbyeon, Heungbu, Okwon, Imwon, and Geundeok.

== See also ==
- Korail: South Korea's national railroad operator
- Transportation in South Korea
- Donghae Nambu Line
- Donghae Bukbu Line
