= Yeongdeok station =

Railway station in Yeongdeok County, South Korea

영덕
Yeongdeok
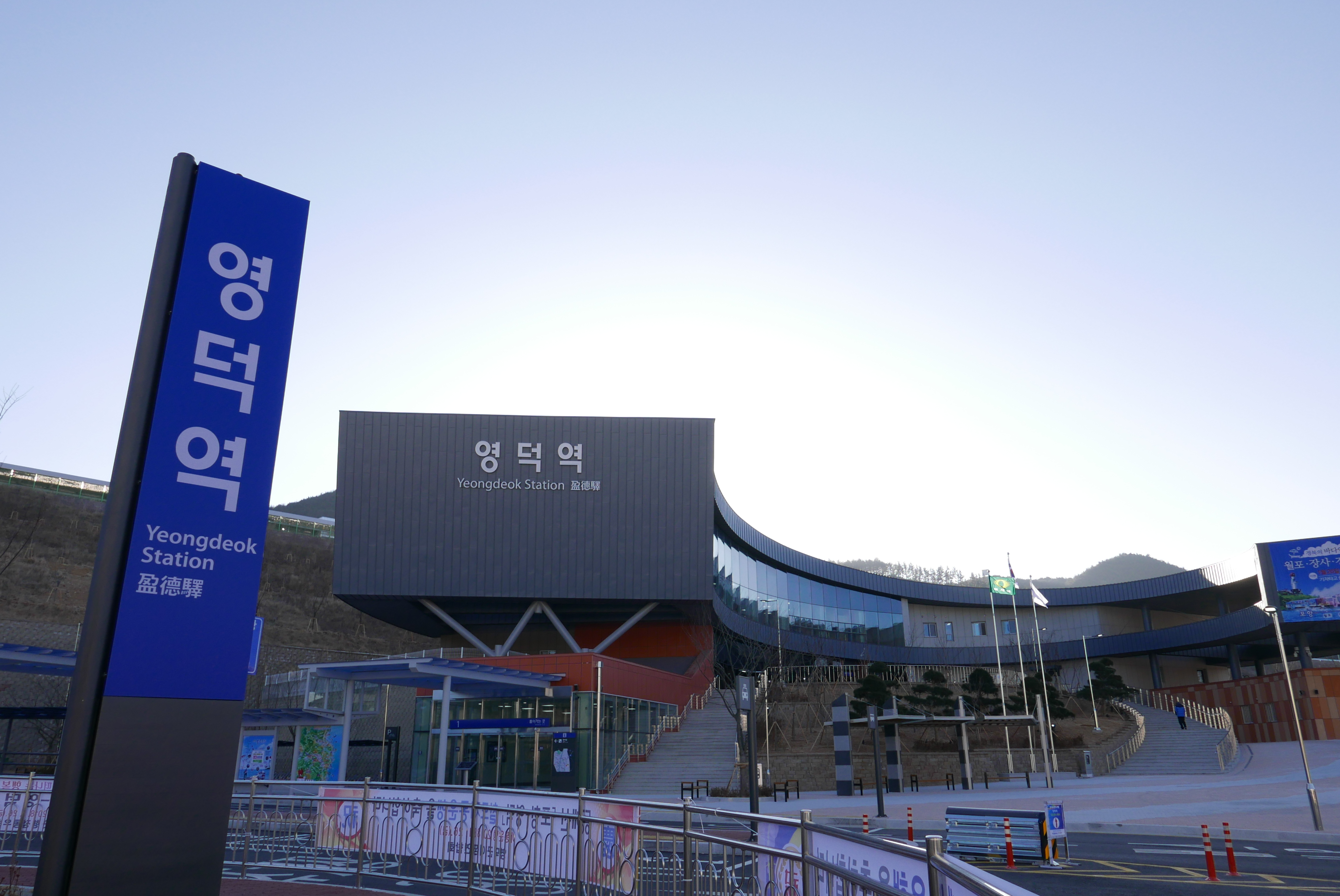

Korean name
- Hangul: 영덕역
- Hanja: 盈德驛
- Revised Romanization: Yeongdeok yeok
- McCune–Reischauer: Yŏngdŏng yŏk

General information
- Location: Yeongdeok County, North Gyeongsang; South Korea
- Coordinates: 36.4103°N 129.3774°E
- Operator: Korail
- Line: Donghae Line

Construction
- Structure type: Aboveground

History
- Opened: January 26, 2018
Location

Yeongdeok station (Korean: 영덕역; Hanja: 盈德驛) is a railway station of the Donghae Line in Yeongdeok County, North Gyeongsang, South Korea.
