= Seongdong-dong, Gyeongju =

Seongdong-dong
- Country: South Korea
- Region: Gyeongju

Government
  - Type: Gyeongju City

Area
  - Total: 0.64 km^{2} (0.25 sq mi)

Population (2008)
  - Total: 4,672
  - Density: 7,300/km^{2} (19,000/sq mi)
- Dialect: Gyeongsang dialect

Korean name
- Hangul: 성동동
- Hanja: 城東洞
- RR: Seongdong-dong
- MR: Sŏngdong-dong

Seongdong-dong (Korean: 성동동) was a dong or a neighbourhood of the Gyeongju City, North Gyeongsang province, South Korea. It was bordered by Dongcheon-dong on the east, Seongnae-dong on the west, Hwango-dong on the south and Yonggang-dong on the north. Its 0.64 square kilometers were home to about 4672 people. It was both an administrative dong and legal dong.

== See also ==
- Subdivisions of Gyeongju
- Administrative divisions of South Korea
