= Bujeon Line =

Railway line in Busan, South Korea

- Hangul: 부전선
- Hanja: 釜田線
- RR: Bujeonseon
- MR: Pujŏnsŏn

The Bujeon Line is a short railway line serving Busan, South Korea. The line connects Gaya on the Gaya Line to Bujeon on the Donghae Nambu Line, without intermediary stops. It is roughly 2.2 kilometers in length.

During the process of double-tracking the Bujeon Line, there were strong demands for measures to relocate residents, so they attempted to occupy the railroad tracks and protest, but it fell through. To make matters worse, even the environmental impact assessment was delayed, and residents' dissatisfaction reached its peak.

== See also ==
- Korean National Railroad
