= Pohang station =

Railway station in South Korea

포항
Pohang
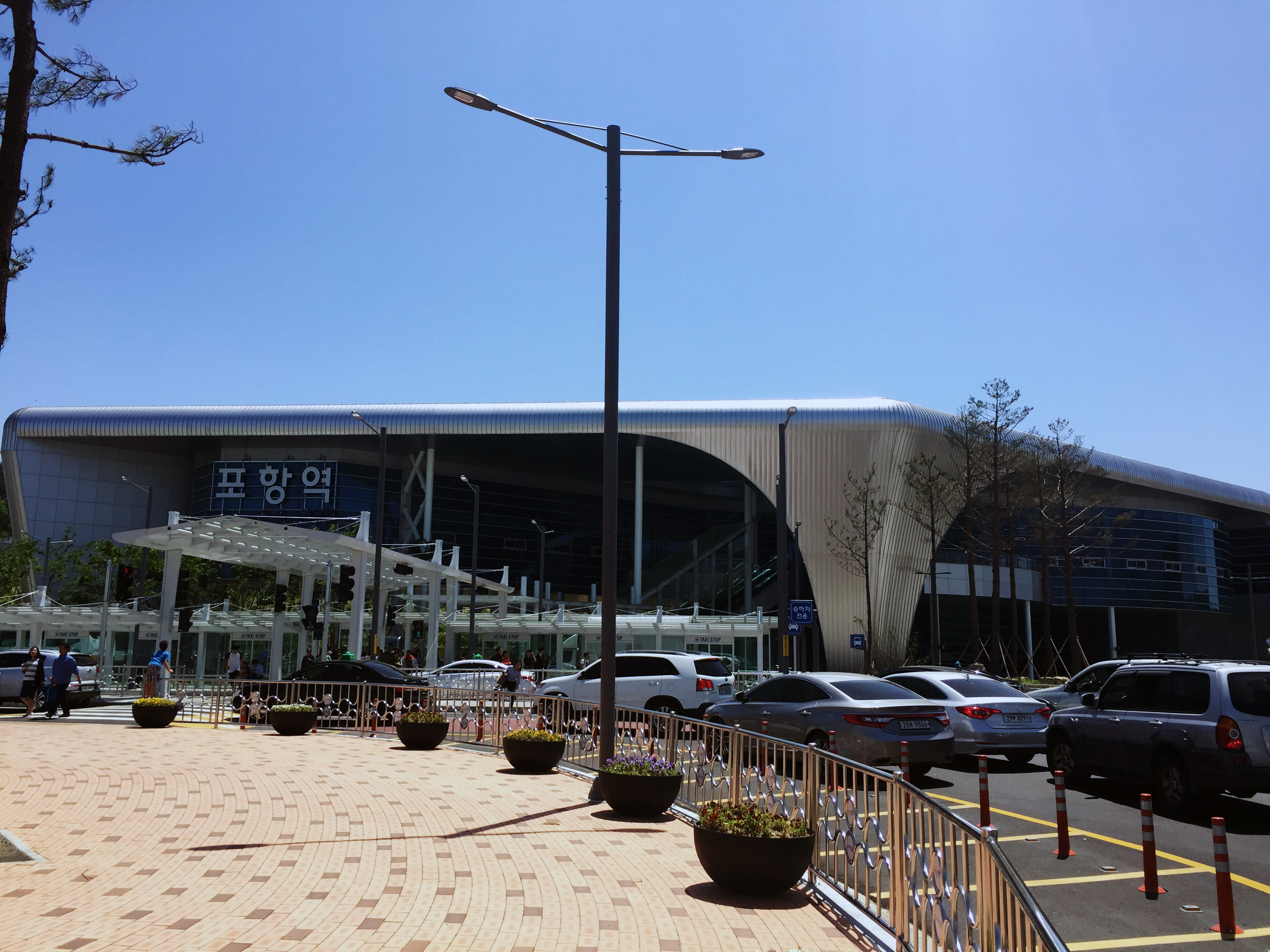

Korean name
- Hangul: 포항역
- Hanja: 浦項驛
- Revised Romanization: Pohang-yeok
- McCune–Reischauer: P'ohang-yŏk

General information
- Location: Iin-ri, Heunghae-eup, Buk-gu, Pohang, North Gyeongsang; South Korea
- Coordinates: 36°4′20″N 129°20′36″E
- Operator: Korail
- Line: Donghae Line
- Platforms: 2
- Tracks: 12

Construction
- Structure type: Ground

History
- Opened: 24 February 2015

Services
Preceding station	Korea Train Express	Following station
Dongdaegu towards Haengsin or Suseo	Donghae KTX	Terminus
Gyeongju towards Bujeon	Donghae KTX	Yeongdeok towards Gangneung
Preceding station	Korail	Following station
Wolpo towards Gangneung	ITX-Maum Donghae Line	Seogyeongju towards Bujeon
Wolpo towards Gangneung	ITX-Maum Donghae Line	Seogyeongju towards Dongdaegu
Angang towards Bujeon or Dongdaegu	Mugunghwa-ho Donghae Line	Terminus
Angang towards Dongdaegu	Nuriro Donghae Line	Wolpo towards Gangneung
Location

Pohang station (Korean: 포항역; Hanja: 浦項驛) is a railway station in the city of Pohang, South Korea. It is on the Donghae Line.

== Services ==
It is serves by Mugunghwa-ho on the Donghae Line that runs to Yeongdeok, Dongdaegu, Bujeon and Suncheon. The KTX trains that runs between Seoul and Pohang that began in service on March 31, 2015, after the completion of the new building on February 24, 2015.

== Former station ==
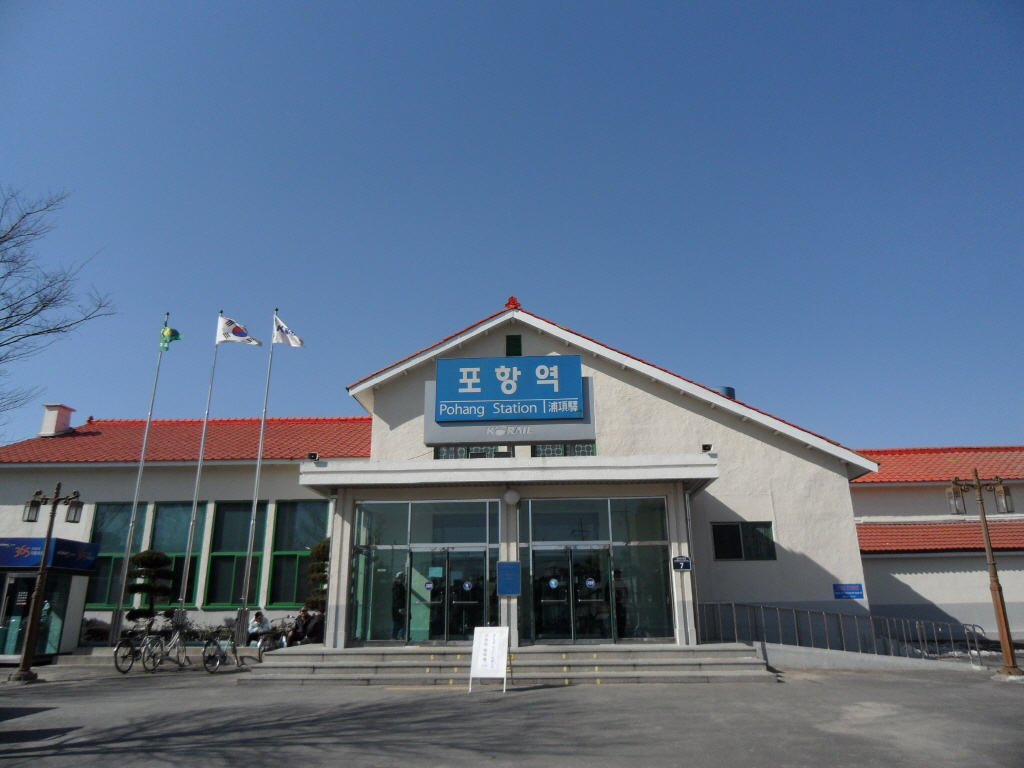
Former Pohang station

The station was originally located at 7 Yongdang-ro 91beon-gil, Jungang-dong, that opened on November 1, 1918, In 2015, due to the switch to the new line, it was moved to the new location that opened on April 2, 2015, and the old station was demolished.

== Station layout ==
Pohang station has 4 platforms for Mugunghwa-ho and ITX-Maum, KTX.

=== Platforms ===
↑ Wolpo ↑
| 5 6 | | | 7 8 | |
↓ Angang Dongdaegu ↓

Platform No.	Line	Train	Destination
5	Donghae Line	Mugunghwa-ho, ITX-Maum	Yeongdeok
6	Donghae Line	Mugunghwa-ho, ITX-Maum	Dongdaegu or Bujeon
7	Donghae Line	KTX	Seoul or Haengsin
8	Donghae Line	KTX	Seoul or Haengsin
