= Busanjin station (Korail) =

Railway station in Busan, South Korea

부산진
Busanjin
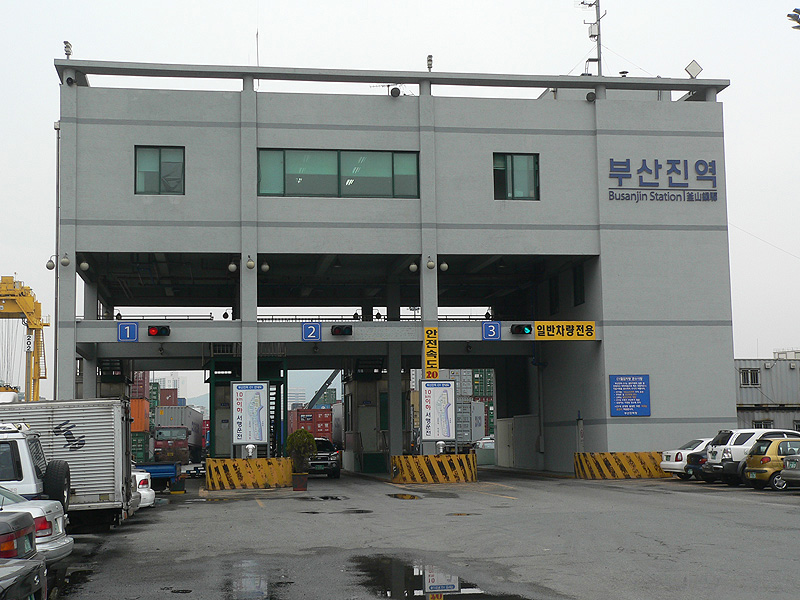

Korean name
- Hangul: 부산진역
- Hanja: 釜山鎮驛
- Revised Romanization: Busanjinnyeok
- McCune–Reischauer: Pusanjinnyŏk

General information
- Location: Jwacheon-dong, Dong District, Busan; South Korea
- Coordinates: 35°07′44″N 129°02′59″E
- Operator: Korail
- Lines: Gyeongbu Line, Donghae Line, Uam Line

Construction
- Structure type: Aboveground

History
- Opened: January 1, 1905
Location

Busanjin Station (Korean: 부산진역; Hanja: 釜山鎮驛) is a railway station in Dong-gu, Busan, southeast South Korea. It is the terminus of the Donghae Line to Pohang, and a stop on the Gyeongbu Line to Seoul. Passenger service was eliminated in 2005, leaving cargo service only.

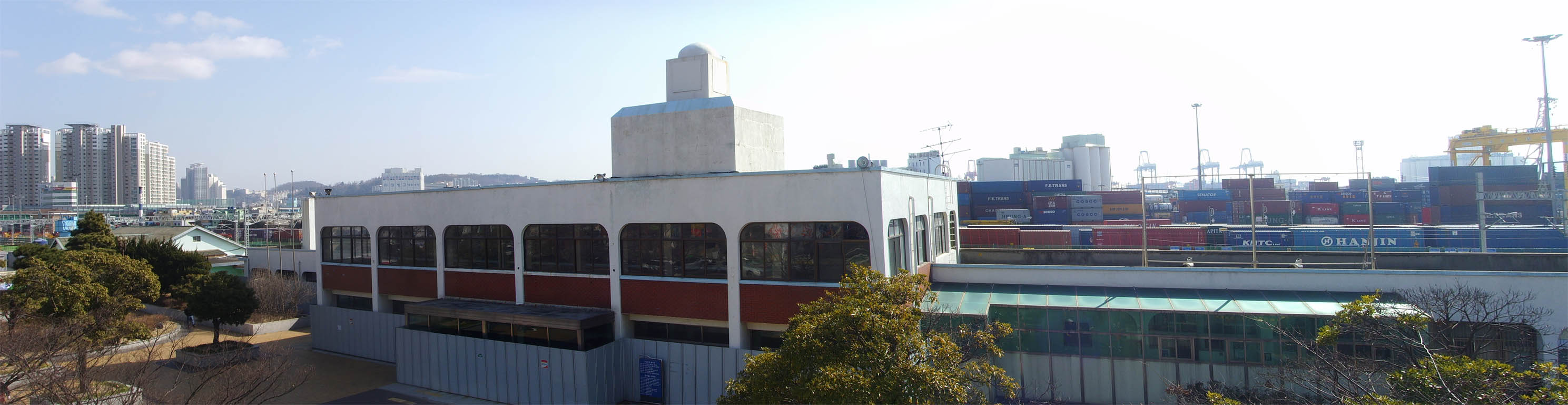
Busanjin train station
