= Bujeon station (Korail) =

Railway station in Busan, South Korea

부전
Bujeon
부전; Bujeon
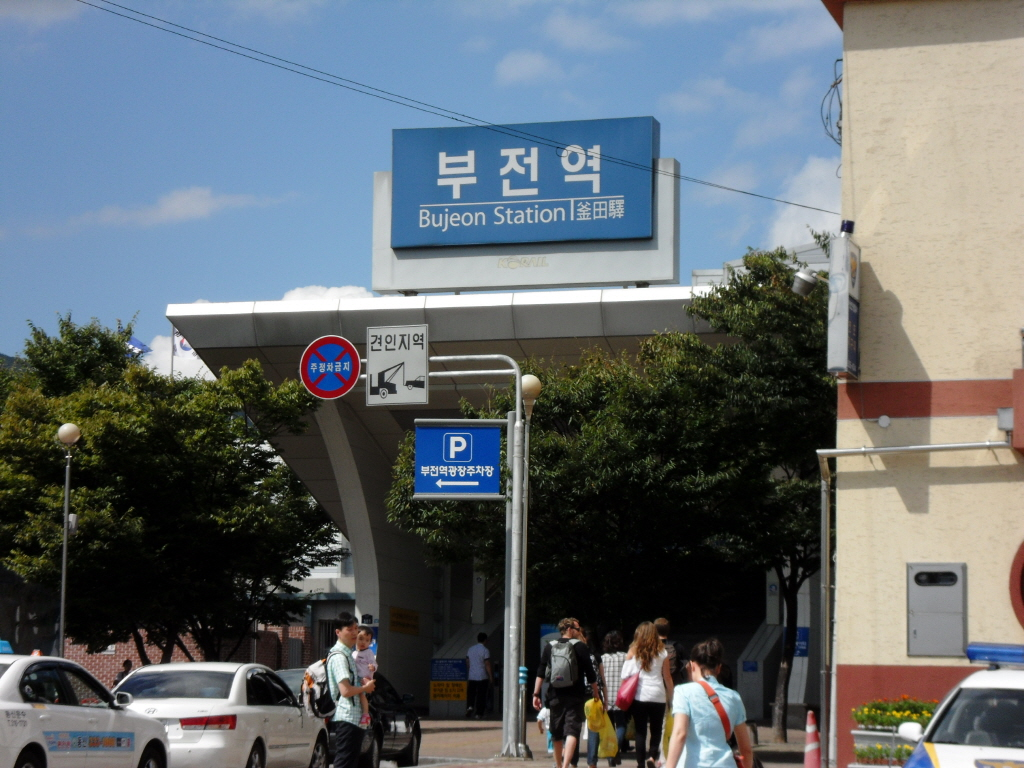

Korean name
- Hangul: 부전역
- Hanja: 釜田驛
- Revised Romanization: Bujeonnyeok
- McCune–Reischauer: Pujŏnnyŏk

General information
- Location: Bujeon-dong, Busanjin District, Busan; South Korea
- Coordinates: 35°09′51″N 129°03′38″E
- Operator: Korail
- Lines: Donghae Line; Bujeon Line

Construction
- Structure type: Aboveground

History
- Opened: April 1, 1943
Services
Preceding station	Busan Metro	Following station
Terminus	Donghae Line	Geojehaemaji towards Taehwagang
Preceding station	Korea Train Express	Following station
Centum towards Seoul	Jungang KTX	Terminus
Terminus	Donghae KTX	Taehwagang towards Gangneung
Preceding station	Korail	Following station
Centum towards Cheongnyangni	ITX-Maum Jungang Line	Terminus
Centum towards Dongdaegu	ITX-Maum Donghae Line	Terminus
Centum towards Gangneung	ITX-Maum Donghae Line	Terminus
Terminus	Mugunghwa-ho Gyeongjeon Line	Sasang towards Suncheon
Terminus	Mugunghwa-ho Mokpo–Boseong Line	Sasang towards Mokpo
Centum towards Pohang	Mugunghwa-ho Donghae Line	Terminus
Centum towards Dongdaegu	Mugunghwa-ho Donghae Line	Terminus
Gupo towards Mokpo	Saemaeul-ho Mokpo–Boseong Line	Terminus
Location

Bujeon station (Korean: 부전역) is a train station in Seomyeon, Busan, South Korea. The station is the terminus of the Donghae Line and the Bujeon Line. In addition, KTX trains on the Gyeongbu Line are planned to stop at the station.

== Services ==
The station is served by Mugunghwa-ho trains on the Gyeongjeon Line connecting Bujeon with Mokpo, South Jeolla Province, the Donghae Line connecting Bujeon with Pohang, North Gyeongsang Province, and the Jungang Line connecting Bujeon with Cheongnyangni, Seoul.

KTX-Eum began operation on December 20, 2024.

== History ==
Service commenced at this station on April 1, 1943.

- April 1, 1943: Service commenced
- January 11, 1944: Promotion in status
- May 16, 1945: Promotion in status to normal station
- January 4, 1965: New construction ordered
- December 2003: Present construction ordered
- January 1, 2004: Completion of the new station building and designation as the starting and ending station for Gyeongjeon Line and Donghae Nambu Line trains
- May 1, 2006: Small parcel service stopped
- November 1, 2008: Cargo service stopped
- January 1, 2013: Saemaeul-ho service between Bujeon and Dongdaegu stopped
- December 30, 2016: Became a subway station with the opening of the first stage of the Donghae Line between Bujeon and Ilgwang.
- January 1, 2017: Saemaeul-class train service resumed as Mugunghwa-ho between Seoul and Shinhaeundae changed to ITX-Saemaeul, incorporated into Donghae Main Line
- March 2, 2020: Mugunghwa-ho between Bujeon and Gangneung shortened to Donghae station
- December 18, 2023: ITX-Maum service begins
- December 20, 2024: KTX-Eum service begins between Cheongnyangni and Bujeon

== Gallery ==
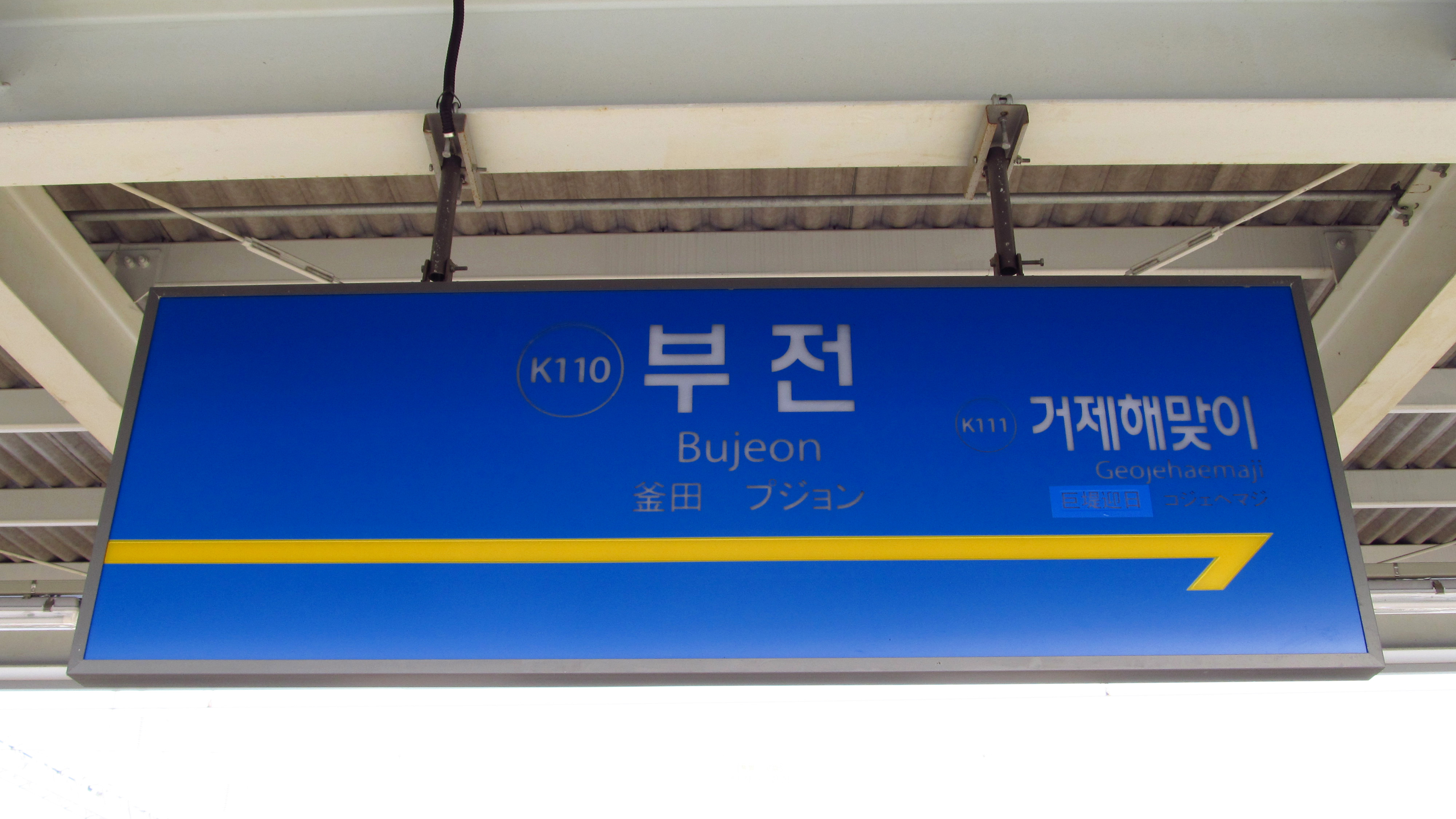
Station sign

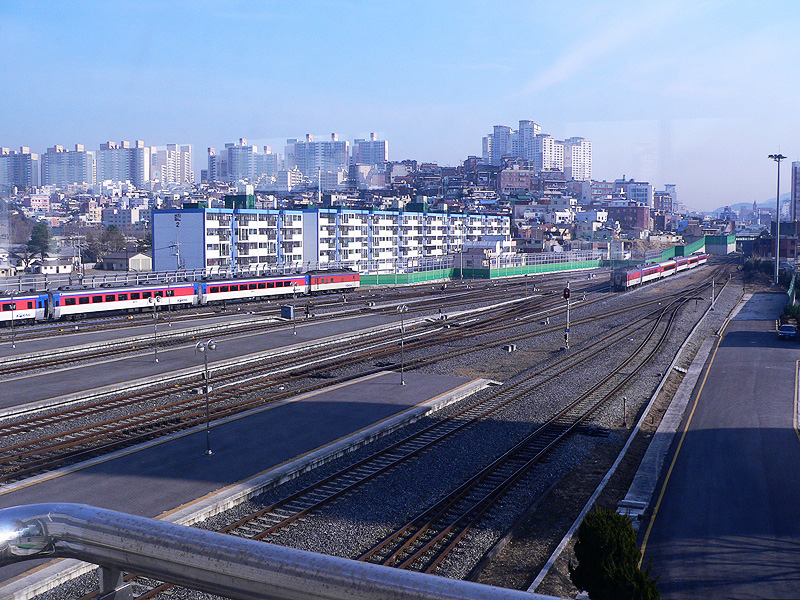
Rail yard

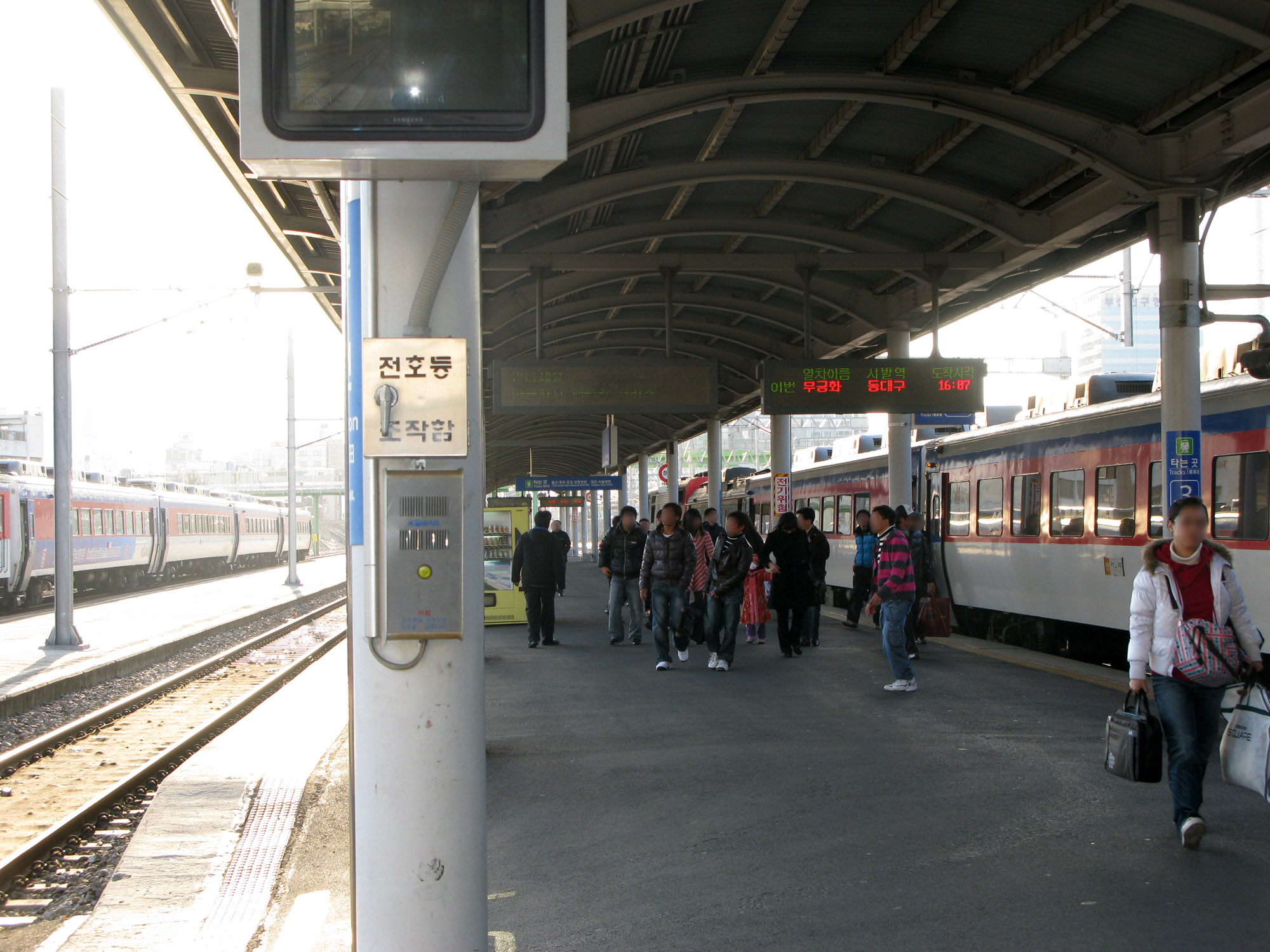
Platforms

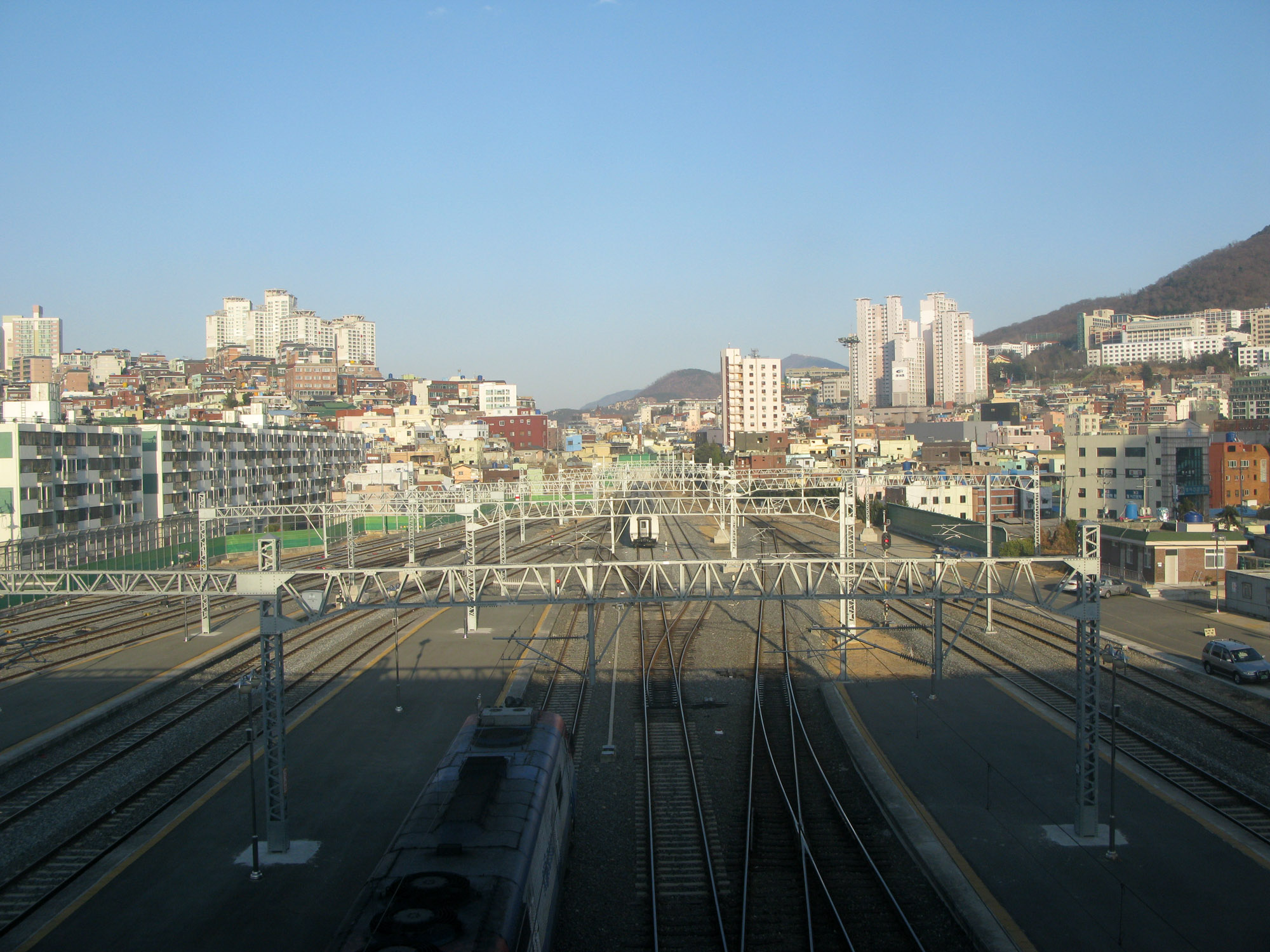
Platforms

== See also ==
- Korail
