= Yangmok station =

Train station in South Korea

Coordinates: 36°02′14″N 128°21′52″E

약목
Yangmok
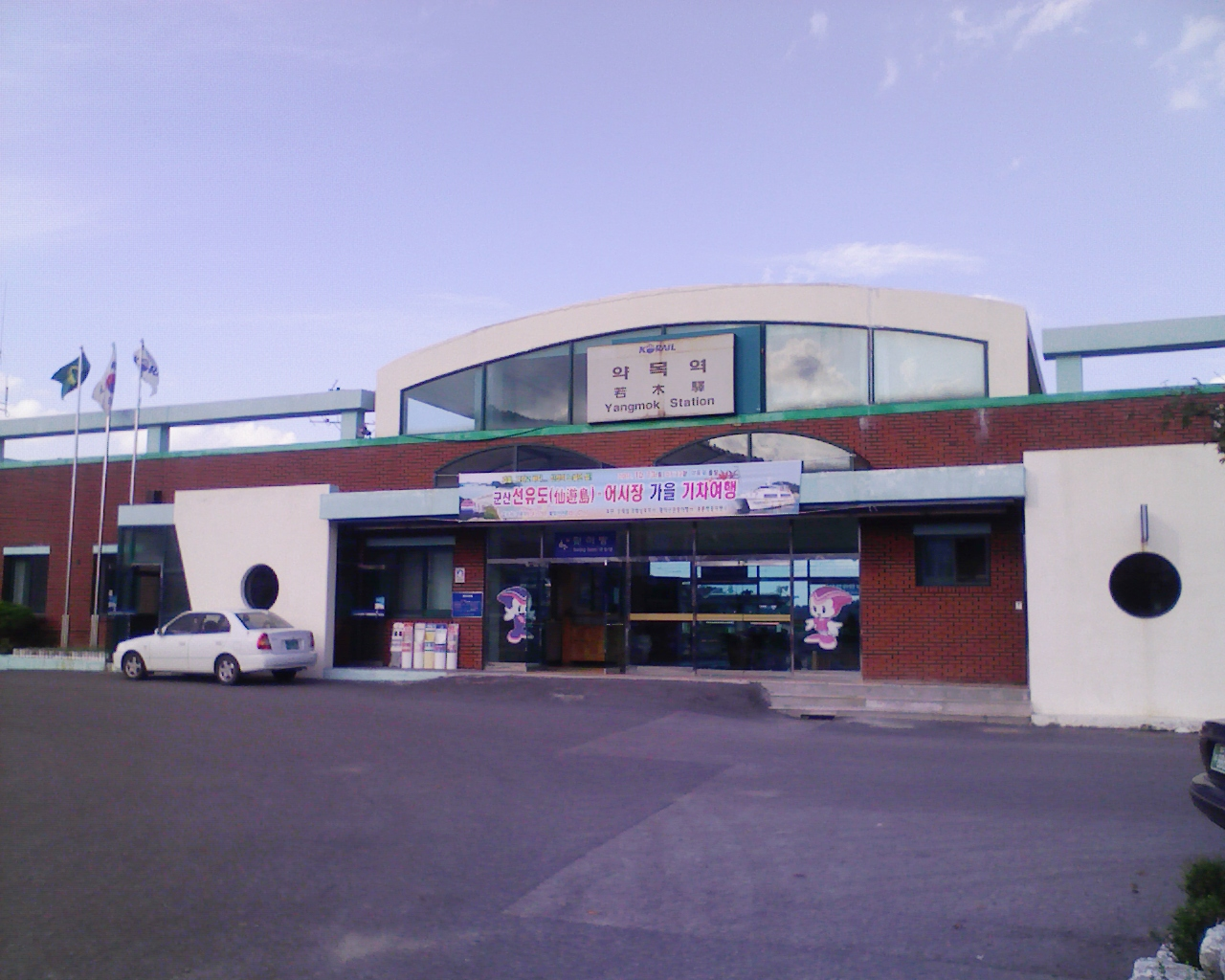

General information
- Line: Gyeongbu Line

History
- Opened: July 1918

Services
Preceding station	Korail	Following station
Gumi towards Daejeon or Seoul	Mugunghwa-ho Gyeongbu Line	Waegwan towards Busan
Location

Yangmok station is a railway station on the Gyeongbu Line, the most important railway line in South Korea and one of the oldest. It is located between Waegwan station and Gumi station.

It is approximately 25-minutes from Daegu station, over 2 hours from Busan, and less than 4 hours from Seoul.
