= Mulgeum station =

Railway station in Yangsan, South Korea

Coordinates: 35°18′25.73″N 128°59′7.33″E

물금
Mulgeum
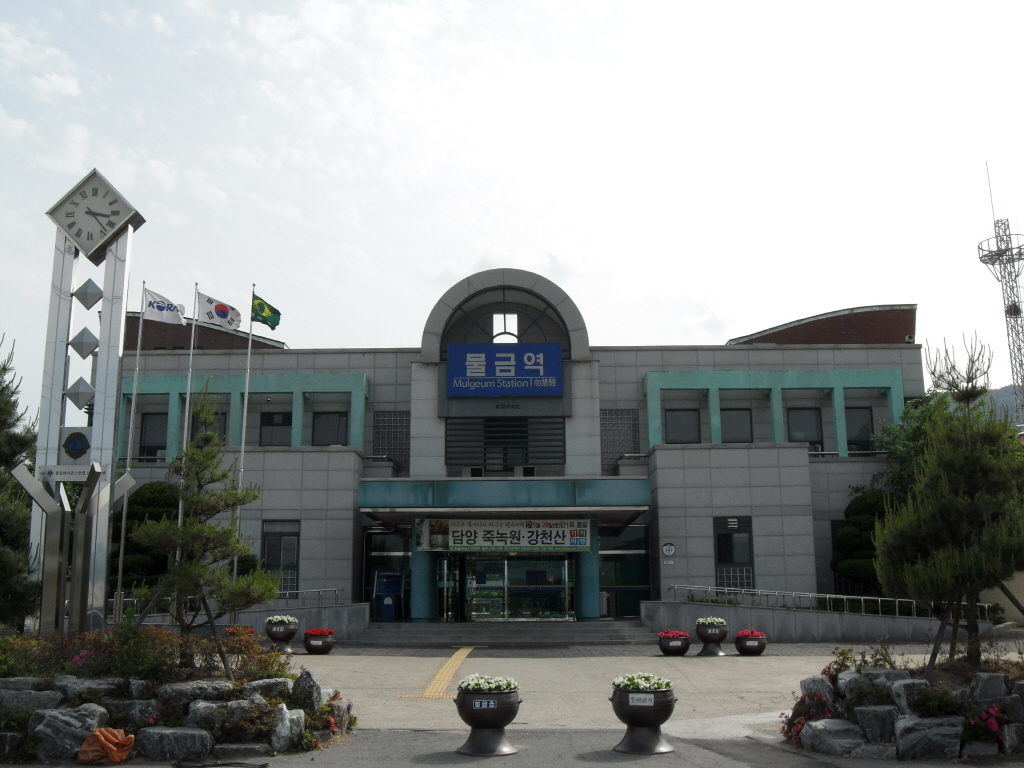

Korean name
- Hangul: 물금역
- Hanja: 勿禁驛
- Revised Romanization: Mulgeum-yeok
- McCune–Reischauer: Mulgŭm-yŏk

General information
- Operator: Korail
- Platforms: 2
- Tracks: 4

Construction
- Structure type: Aboveground/Straight

Key dates
- January 1, 1905: opened

Services
Preceding station	Korea Train Express	Following station
Miryang towards Haengsin or Suseo	Gyeongbu KTX	Gupo towards Busan
Preceding station	Korail	Following station
Miryang towards Seoul	ITX-Saemaeul Gyeongbu Line	Gupo towards Busan
Wondong towards Dongdaegu	ITX-Saemaeul Gyeongbu Line via Hwamyeong and Wondong	Hwamyeong towards Busan
Samnangjin towards Seoul	ITX-Maum Gyeongbu Line	Gupo towards Busan
Wondong towards Daejeon	ITX-Maum Gyeongbu Line via Hwamyeong and Wondong	Hwamyeong towards Busan
Wondong towards Mokpo	Saemaeul-ho Mokpo–Boseong Line	Gupo towards Bujeon
Wondong towards Daejeon or Seoul	Mugunghwa-ho Gyeongbu Line	Hwamyeong towards Busan
Hwamyeong towards Bujeon	Mugunghwa-ho Gyeongjeon Line	Wondong towards Suncheon
Hwamyeong towards Bujeon	Mugunghwa-ho Mokpo–Boseong Line	Wondong towards Mokpo
Gupo towards Busan	S-Train East	Changwonjungang towards Mokpo
Location

Mulgeum station is a railway station on the Gyeongbu Line located in Mulgeum-ri, Mulgeum-eup, Yangsan-si, Gyeongsangnam-do, Korea. It is the starting point of the Yangsan Line.

Mugunghwa-ho and ITX-Saemaeul stops on 40 one-way trips, 20 up and 20 down, each day.

== History ==
1905. 1. 1. Open business at normal station

1939. 6. 1. the completion of a new history

1968. 12. 30. Completion of cargo warehouse

1971. 3. 2. the installation of a cargo ship

1997. 10. 1. Suspend the handling of the parcels (Railway Administration Notice No. 1997-51)

1999. 1. 1. Stop handling parcels (Railway Public Notice No. 1998-72)

2003. 9. 23. the completion of a new history

2006. 5. 10. Opening of a mass-oxidized ship (between Mulgeum Station and Yangsan Station)

2009. 10. 31. Stop cargo handling (National Land, Maritime Affairs and Fisheries Notice 2009-1006)

== Location ==
Mulgeum-ri 372–3 in Mulgeum-eup, Yangsan-si, Gyeongsangnam-do

== Station periphery ==
- Hwangshan Park
- Obongsan Imgyeongdae
- Yangwu Naeanae Apartment 5th
- Mulgeum-eup Office
