= Samnangjin station =

Railway station in South Korea

삼랑진
Samnangjin
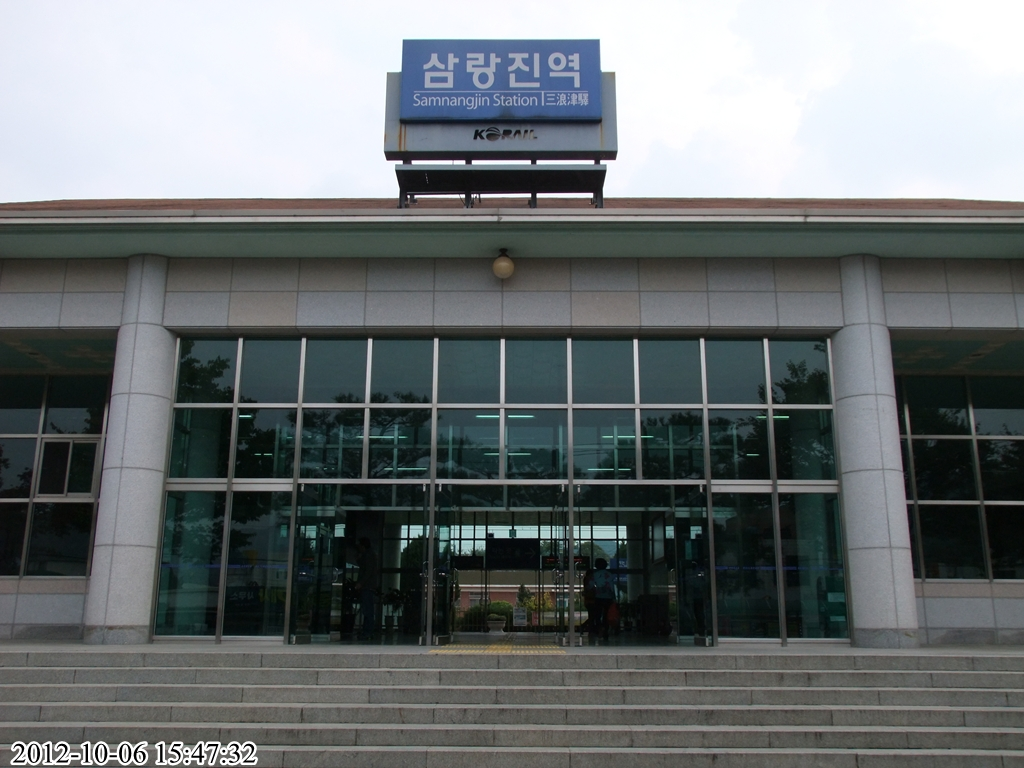

Korean name
- Hangul: 삼랑진역
- Hanja: 三浪津驛
- Revised Romanization: Samnangjinnyeok
- McCune–Reischauer: Samnangjinnyŏk

General information
- Location: Songji-ri, Samnangjin-eup, Miryang, South Gyeongsang; South Korea
- Coordinates: 35°23′57″N 128°50′35″E
- Operator: Korail
- Lines: Gyeongbu Line, Gyeongjeon Line
- Platforms: 3
- Tracks: 6

Construction
- Structure type: Aboveground

History
- Opened: January 1, 1905

Services
Preceding station	Korail	Following station
Miryang towards Seoul	ITX-Saemaeul Gyeongbu Line	Gupo towards Busan
Miryang towards Dongdaegu	ITX-Saemaeul Gyeongbu Line via Wondong	Wondong towards Busan
Miryang towards Seoul	ITX-Maum Gyeongbu Line	Mulgeum towards Busan
Miryang towards Daejeon	ITX-Maum Gyeongbu Line via Wondong	Wondong towards Busan
Changwonjungang towards Mokpo	Saemaeul-ho Mokpo–Boseong Line	Wondong towards Bujeon
Miryang towards Daejeon or Seoul	Mugunghwa-ho Gyeongbu Line	Wondong towards Busan
Wondong towards Bujeon	Mugunghwa-ho Gyeongjeon Line	Hallimjeong towards Suncheon
Wondong towards Bujeon	Mugunghwa-ho Mokpo–Boseong Line	Hallimjeong towards Mokpo
Location
- Location within South Korea

Samnangjin Station (Korean: 삼랑진역) is a railway station on the Gyeongbu Line and the Gyeongjeon Line, located in Miryang, South Korea. The station is served by the Korail Intercity Lines.

== Services ==
Samnangjin Station serves ITX-Saemaeul trains on the Gyeongbu Line and Mugunghwa-ho trains on the Gyeongbu Line and the Gyeongjeon Line.
