= Daehyeon-dong =

- Hangul: 대현동
- RR: Daehyeon-dong
- MR: Taehyŏn-dong

Daehyeon-dong is the name of the following neighbourhoods:

- Daehyeon-dong, Seoul
- Daehyeon-dong, Daegu, a subdivision of Buk District, Daegu
- Daehyeon-dong, Ulsan
