= Hwamyeong station =

Railway station in Busan, South Korea

화명
Hwamyeong
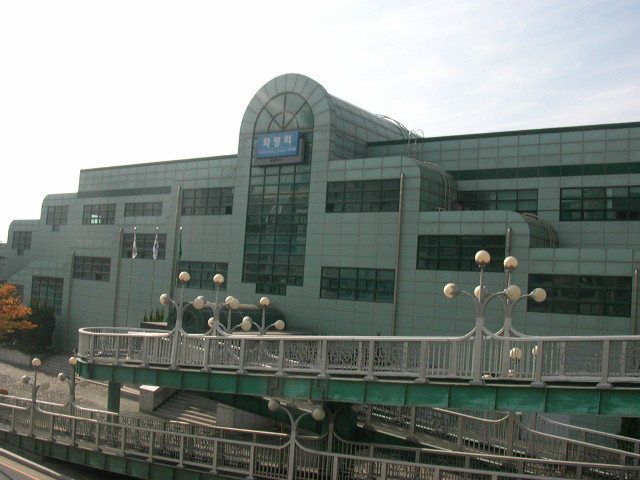

Korean name
- Hangul: 화명역
- Hanja: 華明驛
- Revised Romanization: Hwamyeongyeok
- McCune–Reischauer: Hwamyŏngyŏk

General information
- Location: Hwamyeong-dong, Buk District, Busan; South Korea
- Coordinates: 35°14′04″N 129°00′28″E
- Operator: Korail
- Line: Gyeongbu Line
- Platforms: 2
- Tracks: 3

Construction
- Structure type: Aboveground

History
- Opened: March 10, 1999

Services
Preceding station	Korail	Following station
Mulgeum towards Dongdaegu	ITX-Saemaeul Gyeongbu Line	Gupo towards Busan
Mulgeum towards Daejeon	ITX-Maum Gyeongbu Line	Gupo towards Busan
Mulgeum towards Daejeon or Seoul	Mugunghwa-ho Gyeongbu Line	Gupo towards Busan
Gupo towards Bujeon	Mugunghwa-ho Gyeongjeon Line	Mulgeum towards Suncheon
Mulgeum towards Bujeon	Mugunghwa-ho Mokpo–Boseong Line	Gupo towards Mokpo
Location

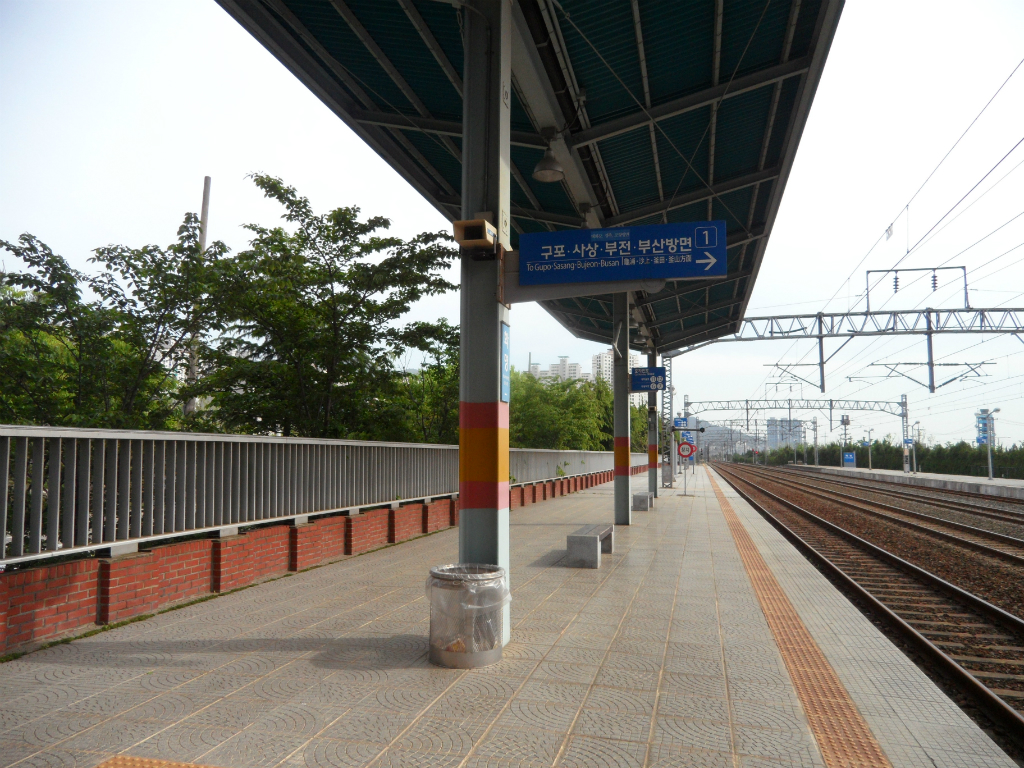
platform

Hwamyeong station (Korean: 화명역) is a train station in northern Busan, South Korea.

It was most recently rebuilt in 1999.

The train and subway stations are not connected directly.

== Tourist attractions ==
- Geumgok-dong Ulypaechong
- Daecheon river baby temple

== See also ==
- Transportation in South Korea
