= Wondong station =

Railway station in Yangsan, South Korea

원동
Wondong
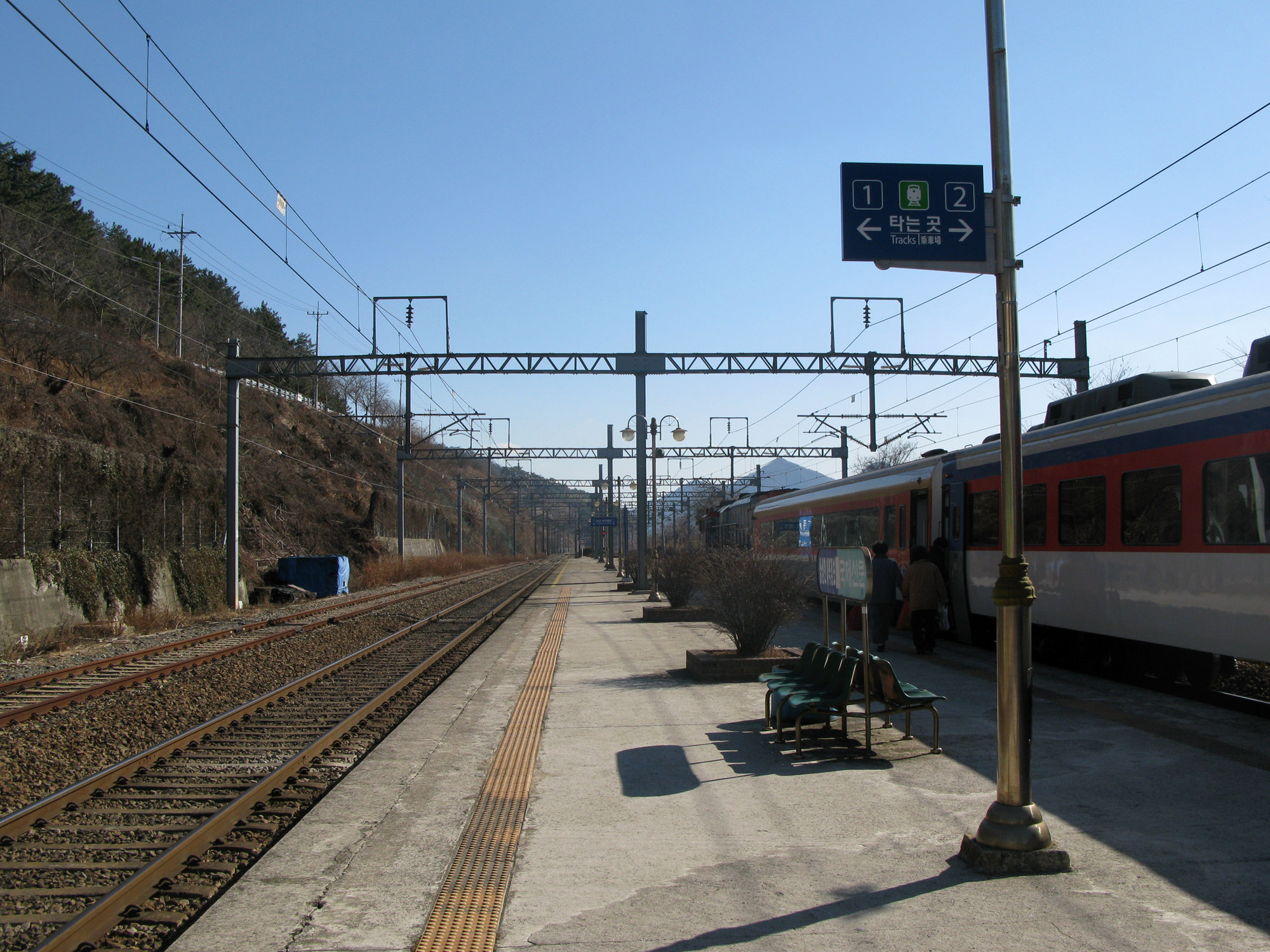

Korean name
- Hangul: 원동역
- Hanja: 院洞驛
- Revised Romanization: Wondongnyeok
- McCune–Reischauer: Wondongnyŏk

General information
- Location: Won-ri, Wondong-myeon, Yangsan, South Gyeongsang; South Korea
- Coordinates: 35°21′45.72″N 128°55′13.08″E
- Operator: Korail
- Line: Gyeongbu Line
- Platforms: 2
- Tracks: 3

Construction
- Structure type: Aboveground

History
- Opened: January 1, 1905

Services
Preceding station	Korail	Following station
Samnangjin towards Dongdaegu	ITX-Saemaeul Gyeongbu Line	Mulgeum towards Busan
Samnangjin towards Daejeon	ITX-Maum Gyeongbu Line	Mulgeum towards Busan
Samnangjin towards Mokpo	Saemaeul-ho Mokpo–Boseong Line	Mulgeum towards Bujeon
Samnangjin towards Daejeon or Seoul	Mugunghwa-ho Gyeongbu Line	Mulgeum towards Busan
Mulgeum towards Bujeon	Mugunghwa-ho Gyeongjeon Line	Samnangjin towards Suncheon
Mulgeum towards Bujeon	Mugunghwa-ho Mokpo–Boseong Line	Samnangjin towards Mokpo
Location
- Location within South Korea

Wondong station is a railway station on the Gyeongbu Line in Won-ri, Wondong-myeon, Yangsan, South Gyeongsang, South Korea.

Mugunghwa trains stop 22 times a day (11 up and 11 down).

Originally, there were no pedestrian overpasses, but the bridge was built in the 1980s due to frequent deaths.

In spring, the Wondong Maehwa Festival is held in Wondong-myeon.

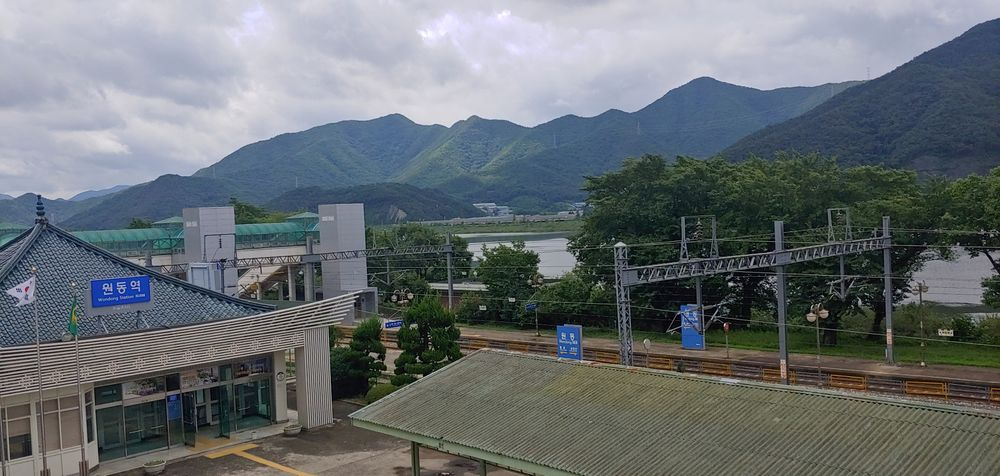
Outside Wondong station
