= Seodaegu station =

Railway station

서대구
Seodaegu
서대구; Seodaegu

Korean name
- Hangul: 서대구역
- Hanja: 西大邱驛
- Revised Romanization: Seodaegu-yeok
- McCune–Reischauer: Sŏdaegu-yŏk

General information
- Location: 527 Waryong-ro, Seo District, Daegu; South Korea
- Coordinates: 35.8815°N 128.5401°E
- Operator: Korail
- Manager: Korail
- Lines: Gyeongbu high-speed railway Gyeongbu Line; Daegyeong Line

History
- Opened: 31 March 2022

Services
Preceding station	Korea Train Express	Following station
Gimcheon(Gumi) towards Haengsin or Suseo	Gyeongbu KTX	Dongdaegu towards Busan
Gimcheon(Gumi) towards Haengsin or Suseo	Gyeongjeon KTX	Dongdaegu towards Jinju
Gimcheon(Gumi) towards Haengsin	Donghae KTX	Dongdaegu towards Pohang
Preceding station	Daegu Metro	Following station
Waegwan towards Gumi	Daegyeong Line	Daegu towards Gyeongsan
Location

Seodaegu station is a new railway station on the Gyeongbu high-speed railway and the Daegyeong Line, newly established in Ihyeon-dong, Seo District, Daegu, South Korea. This station was opened on March 31, 2022.
