= Daegu station =

Train station in South Korea

대구
Daegu
대구; Daegu

Korean name
- Hangul: 대구역
- Hanja: 大邱驛
- Revised Romanization: Daeguyeok
- McCune–Reischauer: Taeguyŏk

General information
- Location: Chilseong-dong, Buk District, Daegu; South Korea
- Coordinates: 35°52′33.35″N 128°35′45.79″E
- Operator: Korail
- Lines: Gyeongbu Line; Daegyeong Line
- Platforms: 3
- Tracks: 5

Construction
- Structure type: Aboveground

History
- Opened: January 1, 1905

Services
Preceding station	Korail	Following station
Waegwan towards Seoul	ITX-Saemaeul Gyeongbu Line	Dongdaegu towards Busan
Waegwan towards Seoul	ITX-Saemaeul Gyeongjeon Line	Dongdaegu towards Jinju
Waegwan towards Seoul	ITX-Maum Gyeongbu Line	Dongdaegu towards Busan
Sindong towards Daejeon or Seoul	Mugunghwa-ho Gyeongbu Line	Dongdaegu towards Busan
Dongdaegu Terminus	Mugunghwa-ho Chungbuk Line	Sindong towards Yeongju
Preceding station	Daegu Metro	Following station
Seodaegu towards Gumi	Daegyeong Line	Dongdaegu towards Gyeongsan
Location

132 대구역 Daegu Station
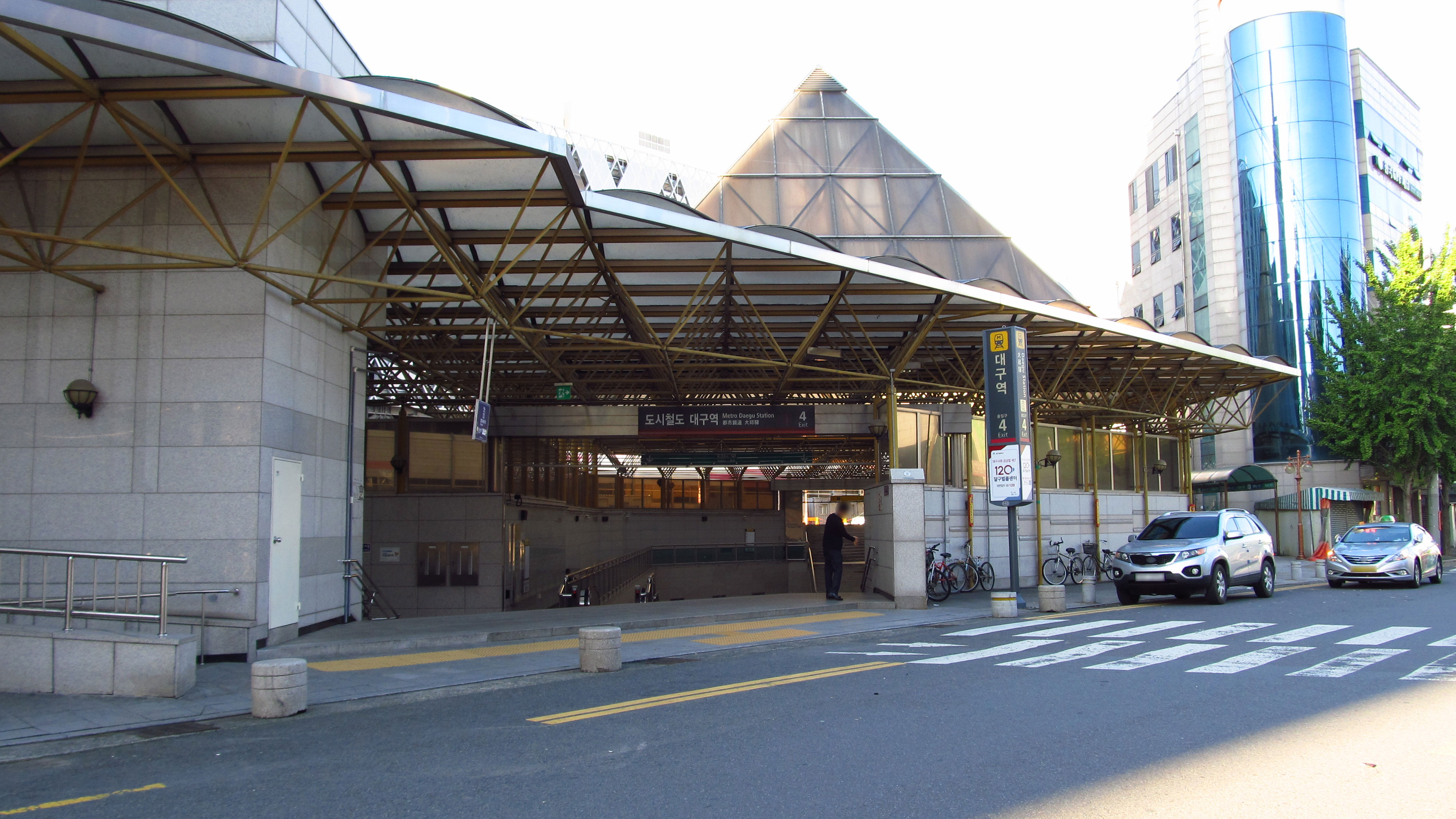
- Daegu station entrance No. 4

General information
- Coordinates: 35°52′35″N 128°35′50″E
- Operator: Daegu Transportation Corporation
- Line: Line 1
- Platforms: 2
- Tracks: 2

Construction
- Structure type: Underground

Other information
- Station code: 132

History
- Opened: May 2, 1998

Services
Preceding station	Daegu Metro	Following station
Jungangno towards Seolhwa–Myeonggok	Line 1	Chilseong Market towards Hayang
Location

Daegu Station is a station on the Gyeongbu Line, Daegyeong Line and Daegu Metro Line 1 in Chilseong-dong, Buk District, Daegu, South Korea.

In December 2024, the Daegyeong line extension was opened incorporating the station.

== See also ==
- Autumn Uprising of 1946
- Lotte Department Store
