= Shi-Chul Lee =

South Korean academic (born 1963)

- Born: 1963 (age 62–63)
- Title: Professor and Executive Vice President at Kyungpook National University (KNU)

Korean name
- Hangul: 이시철
- Hanja: 李始哲
- RR: I Sicheol
- MR: I Sich'ŏl

Shi-Chul Lee (Korean: 이시철; born 1963) is a professor and university administrator in South Korea. He was a two-time Fulbright Visiting Fellow, affiliated with Yale University (2017–18) and with the University of Massachusetts Amherst (2009–10). He is the Executive Vice President of Kyungpook National University (KNU), South Korea's largest national university. Currently, he is a professor in the KNU School of Public Administration. In 2024, he was reappointed as KNU vice president and dean of the graduate school when Professor Young-Woo Heo took over as president of Kyungpook National University.

== Early life and education ==
Lee graduated from Kyungpook National University in Daegu for his bachelor's degree and obtained his master's degree at Seoul National University. He received his Ph.D. in Urban Design & Planning from the University of Washington (UW) in 2000 (Dissertation: Measuring acceptance of regulatory growth management policy).

== Government career ==
Before entering academia in 2003, Lee served both the national and local governments in South Korea for 15 years. In 2001, Lee was Director of International Relations in Daejeon, South Korea's fourth largest city. His last government job was Director-General of Transportation Bureau in Daejeon Metropolitan City.

== Academic career ==
In 2003, Lee became an assistant professor at his alma mater, KNU. His academic interests include urban policy (growth management, green urbanism, urban health, etc.) and public personnel policy. He has published more than 40 academic articles on urban planning and public policy in various domestic and international journals. Over the years, he has served numerous administrative positions in addition to his academic commitments in and outside of KNU, including: Dean of Graduate School of Public Administration (2012–14), Dean of Strategy & Finance (2016), and Dean of Academic Affairs (2016–17). He was also Editor-in-Chief for the Journal of Local Government Studies in South Korea for two years (2012–14) and President of Korean Association for Governmental Studies (2019).

For his first sabbatical year in 2009, he stayed at the University of Massachusetts Amherst (UMass) as a Fulbright Lecturing Professor, teaching two courses: “Asian Public Policy” and “Asian Cities & Planning.” Yale University was his second destination as a Fulbright Visiting Fellow for his sabbatical in 2017. On top of his research commitments, he co-taught a regular graduate course in spring of 2018, “Contemporary Issues & Research Methods on the Urban Environment,” at Yale School of Environmental Studies. After returning to South Korea, he published a book in Korean entitled Yale, The Four Seasons (예일, 사계), which is based on his experiences and insights on Yale and U.S. colleges.

From 2020 to 2022, he served as the Executive Vice President & Dean of Graduate School at KNU. Over the past decades Lee has received numerous awards including Best Completed Work by a Graduate Student (UW, 2001), Outstanding Public Official Award (2001), Presidential Award for Excellent Educators (2013), and Best Article Awards of the Year (Korean Association for Governmental Studies, 2009; Korean Urban Management Association, 2017; Korean Association for Local Government Studies, 2023); etc.).

== Selected bibliography ==
=== Academic articles ===
- Exploring the Applicability of Meritocracy as a Framework for Analyzing Spatial Inequality (Journal of Korean Planning Association 2025) https://www.kci.go.kr/kciportal/ci/sereArticleSearch/ciSereArtiView.kci?sereArticleSearchBean.artiId=ART003180008
- A proposal on mini-public experiment: Focusing on the debate on election and lottery system for local council (2022)Journal of Local Government Studies
- Analyzing key issues in meritocracy: A focus on the public sector (Korean) (2021)
- Analyzing early responses to COVID-19: Daegu case (Korean) (2020)
- Exploring compatibility of density and safety: An inquiry on spatial planning shift in COVID-19 era (Korean) (2020)
- Examining the internal features of Korea's Green Commitment in Mongolia (2017)
- Health impact of spatial planning: An inquiry comparing Sweden and Korea (2016)
- A Tale of Two Greens: European green urbanism and Korea's Green Growth policies (2015)
- Implications of green urbanism for Korea's urban management (Korean) (2013)
- Two Paths of Korea's Clustering: Centralized De-concentration and Regionalized Concentration (2012)
- Recent decentralization challenges in Korea (2007)
- Aiming for Sustainable Urban Development (2002)
- Measuring acceptance of growth management policy (2001)

=== Books ===
Published in English:

- The Experience of democracy and bureaucracy in South Korea (2017, co-authored)
- A multivariate analysis of growth management (2016)
- Sustainable City Regions (2007, co-authored)

Published in Korean, Hangeul:

- Two logics of public personnel administration: administrative & political perspectives (인사행정, 행정논리와 정치논리 in Hangeul) (2022, co-authored)
- K-Public Administration (K행정학 in Hangeul) (2021, co-authored)
- Yale, The Four Seasons (예일, 사계 in Hangeul) (2020)
- Green Urbanism (translation, 그린 어바니즘 in Hangeul)) (2013)
- Performance-related pay policies for government employees (translation, 공무원 성과연계 급여정책 in Hangeul) (2008)

=== Newspaper articles ===
- "The BK21 project is not a “leaky bucket” but a “catalyst" (중앙일보 2025-03-13), JoongAng Ilbo Newspaper
- "The new path for local universities" (매일신문 2025-04-14), Maeil Shinmun Newspaper
- "Government regulation hinders reform of national universities,” Weekly Kyunghyang (August 29, 2022)
- "Looking for future graduate students in ‘quantum’ era of change," Maeil Shinmun (September 26, 2022)
- “Covid-19, State, and Balanced Development,” Youngnam Ilbo (June 9, 2020, (Korean)).
- “KNU community treatment center vs. Yale’s one million dollars,” Maeil Shinmun (April 12, 2020, (Korean)).
- “Corona world viewed by Daegu residents,” 한겨레신문 (March 23, 2020, (Korean)).
- “Responding to Coronavirus, in the U.S. and Asia,” New York Times (February 28, 2020).
- “A visiting Korean says goodbye to New Haven,” New Haven Register (July 13, 2018).
- “Hailing Yale, Lamenting America,” Yale Daily News (November 9, 2017).
- “Leaving Amherst, a small place with big ideas,” Massachusetts Daily Collegian (December 7, 2010).
