= Guam Station =

Guam Station (Korean: 구암역) is the name of several railroad stations in South Korea.

- Guam Station (Daejeon)
- Guam Station (Daegu)
