= Maecheon station =

Station of the Daegu Metro

319 매천 Maecheon
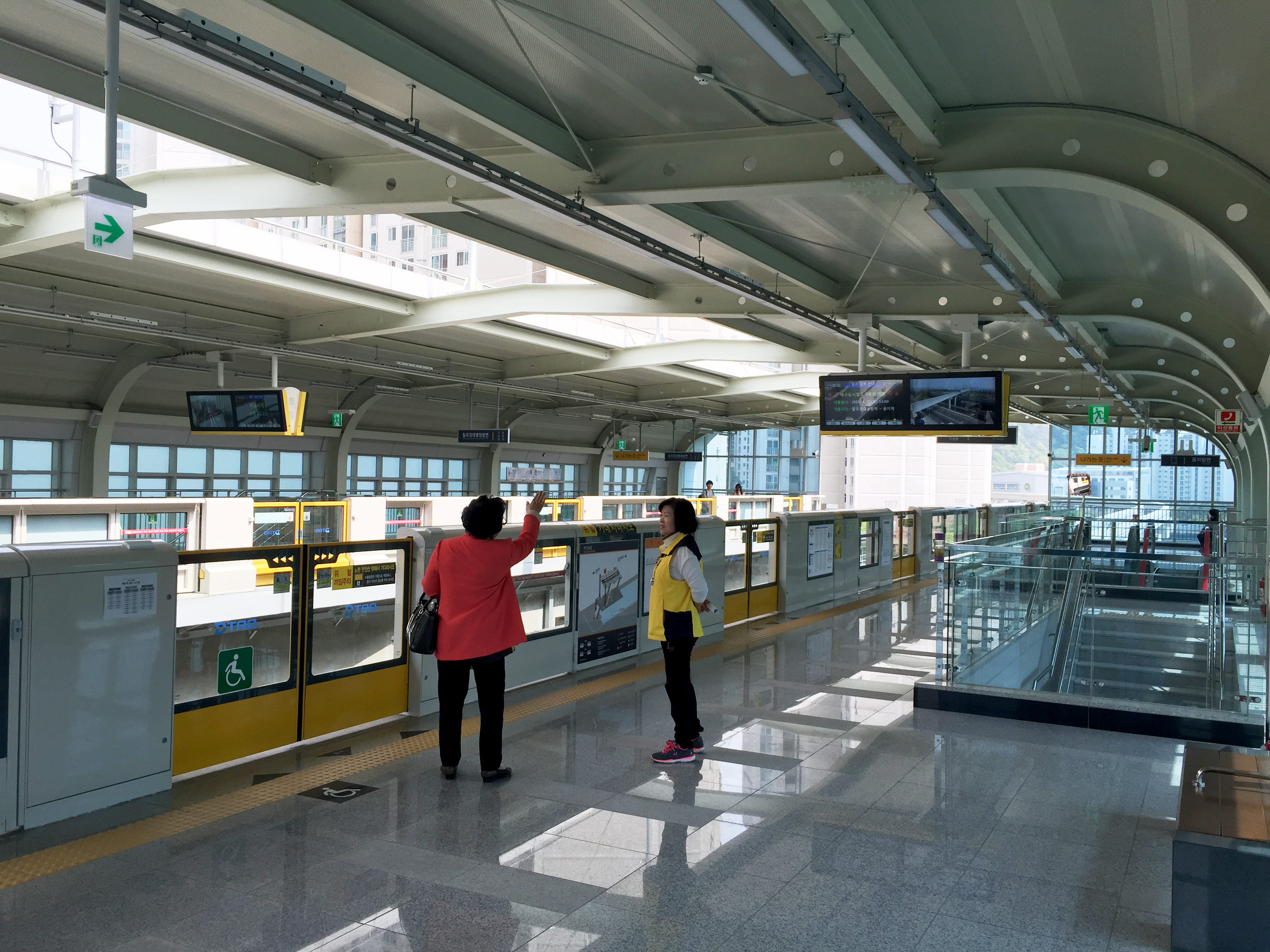
- The platforms and tracks in 2015

Korean name
- Hangul: 매천역
- Hanja: 梅川驛
- Revised Romanization: Maecheon yeok
- McCune–Reischauer: Maech'ŏn yŏk

General information
- Location: Maecheon-dong, Buk District, Daegu; South Korea
- Coordinates: 35°54′46″N 128°32′37″E
- Operator: DTRO
- Line: Daegu Metro Line 3
- Platforms: 2
- Tracks: 2

Construction
- Structure type: Overground

Other information
- Station code: 319

History
- Opened: April 23, 2015
Location

Station exterior

Maecheon Station is a station of Daegu Metro Line 3 in Maecheon-dong, Buk District, Daegu, South Korea.

Preceding station	Daegu Metro	Following station
Taejeon towards Chilgok Kyungpook National University Medical Center	Line 3	Maecheon Market towards Yongji
