= Gupo station =

Railway station in Busan, South Korea

구포
Gupo
- Station building

Korean name
- Hangul: 구포역
- Hanja: 龜浦驛
- Revised Romanization: Gupoyeok
- McCune–Reischauer: Kup'oyŏk

General information
- Location: Gupo-dong, Buk District, Busan; South Korea
- Coordinates: 35°12′16.60″N 128°59′47.61″E
- Operator: Korail
- Line: Gyeongbu Line
- Platforms: 2
- Tracks: 4

Construction
- Structure type: Aboveground

History
- Opened: January 1, 1905

Services
| Preceding station | Korea Train Express | Following station |
|---|---|---|
| Mulgeum towards Haengsin or Suseo | Gyeongbu KTX | Busan Terminus |
| Preceding station | Korail | Following station |
| Samnangjin towards Seoul | ITX-Saemaeul Gyeongbu Line | Busan Terminus |
| Mulgeum towards Seoul | ITX-Saemaeul Gyeongbu Line via Mulgeum | Busan Terminus |
| Hwamyeong towards Dongdaegu | ITX-Saemaeul Gyeongbu Line via Hwamyeong and Sasang | Sasang towards Busan |
| Mulgeum towards Seoul | ITX-Maum Gyeongbu Line | Busan Terminus |
| Hwamyeong towards Daejeon | ITX-Maum Gyeongbu Line via Hwamyeong or Sasang | Sasang towards Busan |
| Mulgeum towards Mokpo | Saemaeul-ho Mokpo–Boseong Line | Bujeon Terminus |
| Hwamyeong towards Seoul | Mugunghwa-ho Gyeongbu Line | Sasang towards Busan |
| Hwamyeong towards Daejeon | Mugunghwa-ho Gyeongbu Line | Busan Terminus |
| Sasang towards Bujeon | Mugunghwa-ho Gyeongjeon Line | Hwamyeong towards Suncheon |
| Sasang towards Bujeon | Mugunghwa-ho Mokpo–Boseong Line | Hwamyeong towards Mokpo |
| Busan Terminus | S-Train East | Mulgeum towards Mokpo |
Location

Gupo station is a Korail station on the Gyeongbu Line, between Hwamyeong station and Sasang station, located in northern Busan, South Korea. It was opened on 1 January 1905, and is connected with the subway Gupo station on Busan Metro Line 3 via an overhead bridge, so passengers can transfer.

On January 1, 1905, the operation was started as a temporary-operation station. It was adjusted to the office building in 1991 and began operating the KTX in 2004. KTX, ITX-Saemaeul and Mugunghwa-ho trains run and are in charge of passenger and ticket sales.

== History ==
- January 1, 1905: Start of operation as a driving station
- December 30, 1985: Present history completion
- August 16, 1989: The east–west transit train (Gupo–Haeundae) passenger handling began
- January 7, 1991: Coordinated to the officer's office
- December 2, 2002: Abolished the east–west transit railway
- April 1, 2004: KTX stopping
- November 15, 2006: Stop handling cargo handling

== See also ==
- Transportation in South Korea
- Busan Metro Line 3
