= Chilgok-Unam station =

Station of the Daegu Metro

316 칠곡운암 Chilgok·Unam
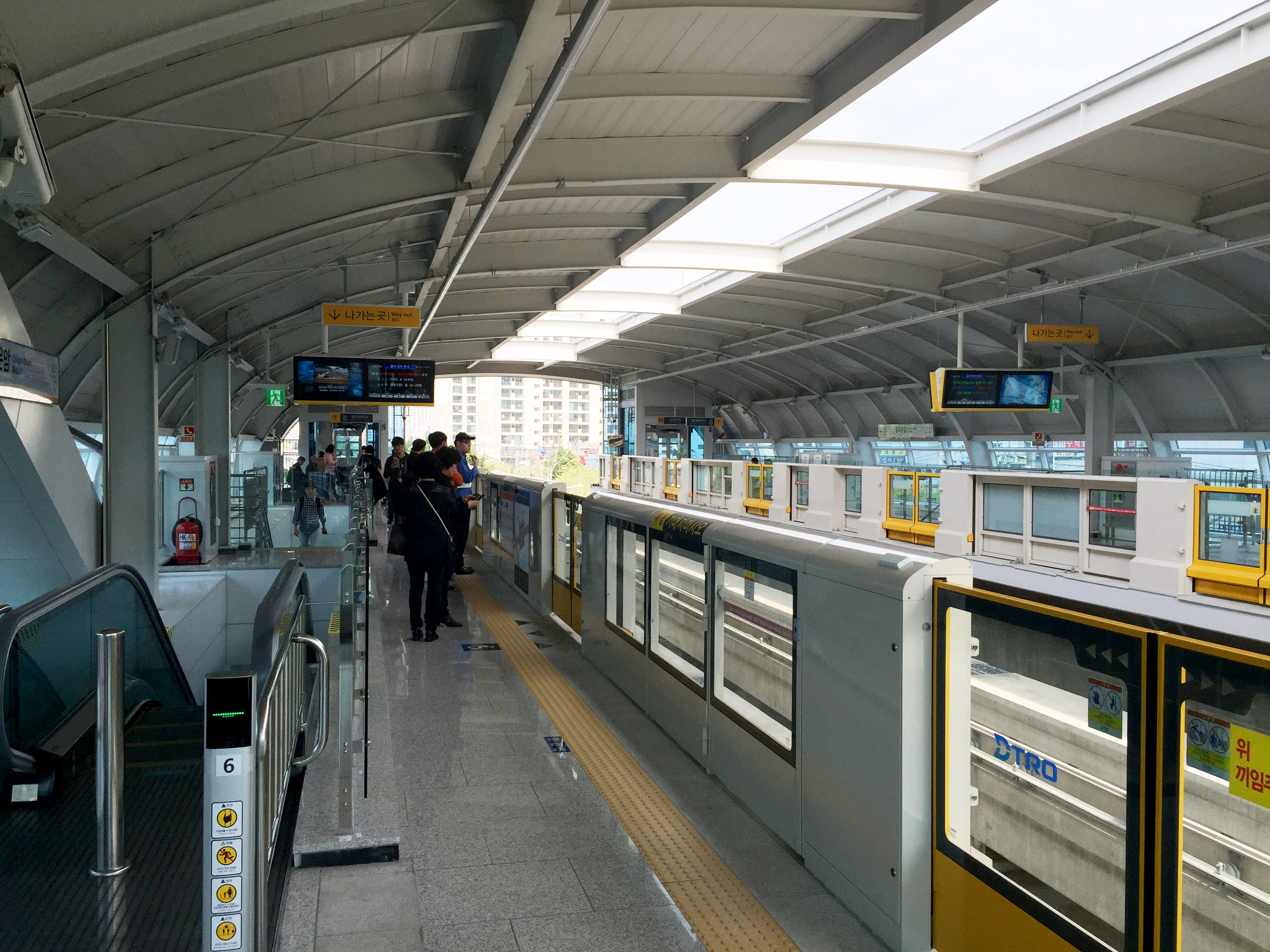

Korean name
- Hangul: 칠곡운암역
- Hanja: 漆谷雲岩驛
- Revised Romanization: Chilgok unam yeok
- McCune–Reischauer: Ch'ilkok unam yŏk

General information
- Location: Guam-dong, Buk District, Daegu; South Korea
- Coordinates: 35°55′53″N 128°33′16″E
- Operator: DTRO
- Platforms: 2
- Tracks: 2

Construction
- Structure type: Overground

Other information
- Station code: 316

History
- Opened: April 23, 2015

Services
Preceding station	Daegu Metro	Following station
Dongcheon towards Chilgok Kyungpook National University Medical Center	Line 3	Guam towards Yongji
Location

Chilgok·Unam Station is a station of the Daegu Metro Line 3 in Guam-dong, Buk District, Daegu, South Korea.
