= Chilseong =

Chilseong (Korean: 칠성) may refer to

- Lotte Chilsung: South Korea beverage manufacturer
- Chilseongsin: Korean deity
- Chilseong Market station: Metro station in Daegu
