= Waegwan station =

Train station in South Korea

왜관
Waegwan
왜관; Waegwan
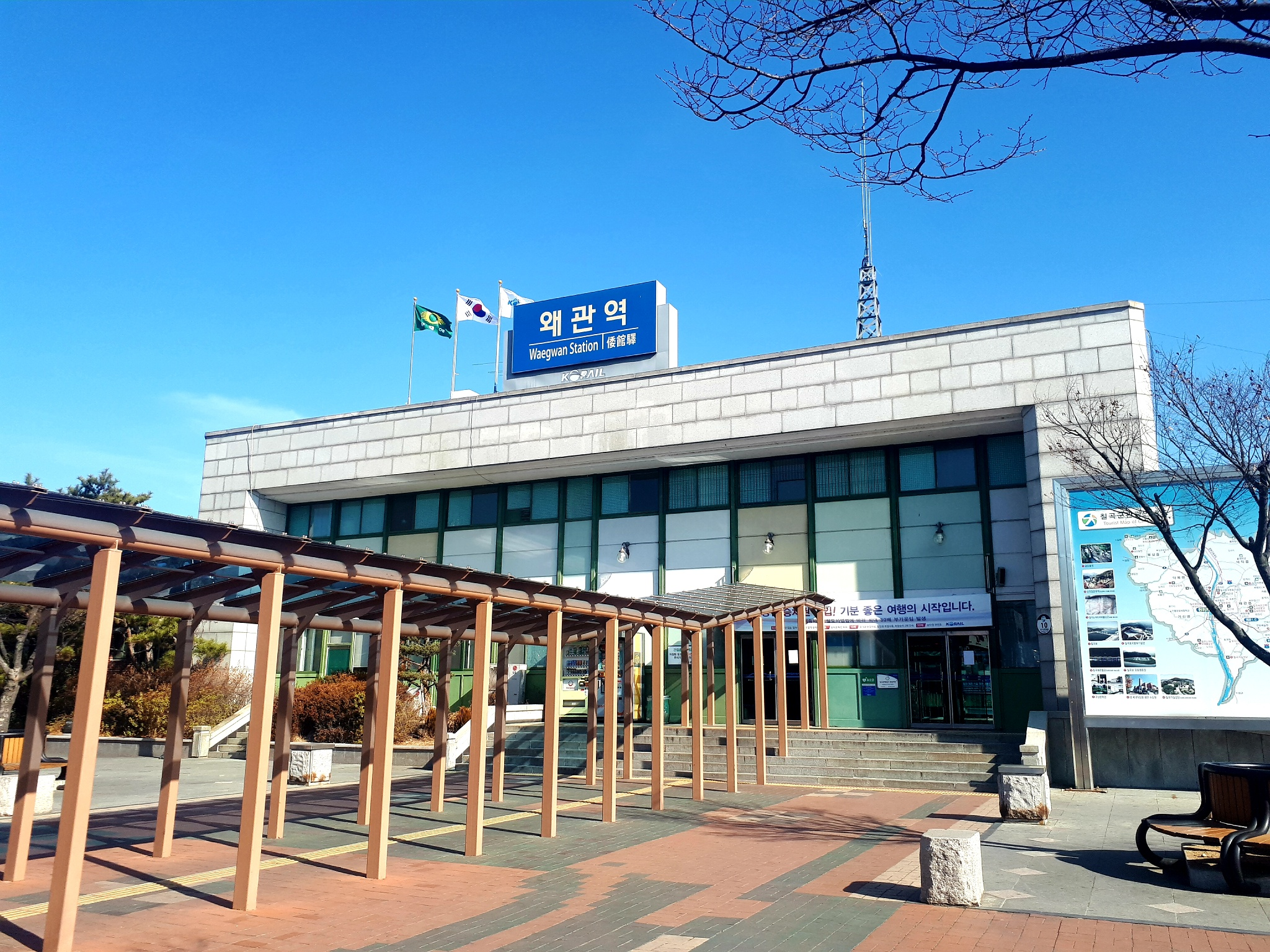

Korean name
- Hangul: 왜관역
- Hanja: 倭館驛
- Revised Romanization: Waegwannyeok
- McCune–Reischauer: Waegwannyŏk

General information
- Location: Waegwan-ri, Waegwan-eup, Chilgok, North Gyeongsang; South Korea
- Coordinates: 35°59′32″N 128°24′01″E
- Operator: Korail
- Lines: Gyeongbu Line; Daegyeong Line

Construction
- Structure type: Aboveground

History
- Opened: January 1, 1905

Services
Preceding station	Korail	Following station
Gumi towards Seoul	ITX-Saemaeul Gyeongbu Line	Daegu towards Busan
Gumi towards Seoul	ITX-Saemaeul Gyeongjeon Line	Daegu towards Jinju
Gumi towards Seoul	ITX-Maum Gyeongbu Line	Daegu towards Busan
Gumi towards Daejeon or Seoul	Mugunghwa-ho Gyeongbu Line	Sindong towards Busan
Sindong towards Dongdaegu	Mugunghwa-ho Chungbuk Line	Gumi towards Yeongju
Preceding station	Daegu Metro	Following station
Buksam towards Gumi	Daegyeong Line	Seodaegu towards Gyeongsan
Location

Waegwan station is a railway station on the Gyeongbu Line and the Daegyeong Line in South Korea.
