= Chilseong Market station =

Station of the Daegu Metro

133 칠성시장 (MS재건병원) Chilseong Market (MS Jaegon Hospital)
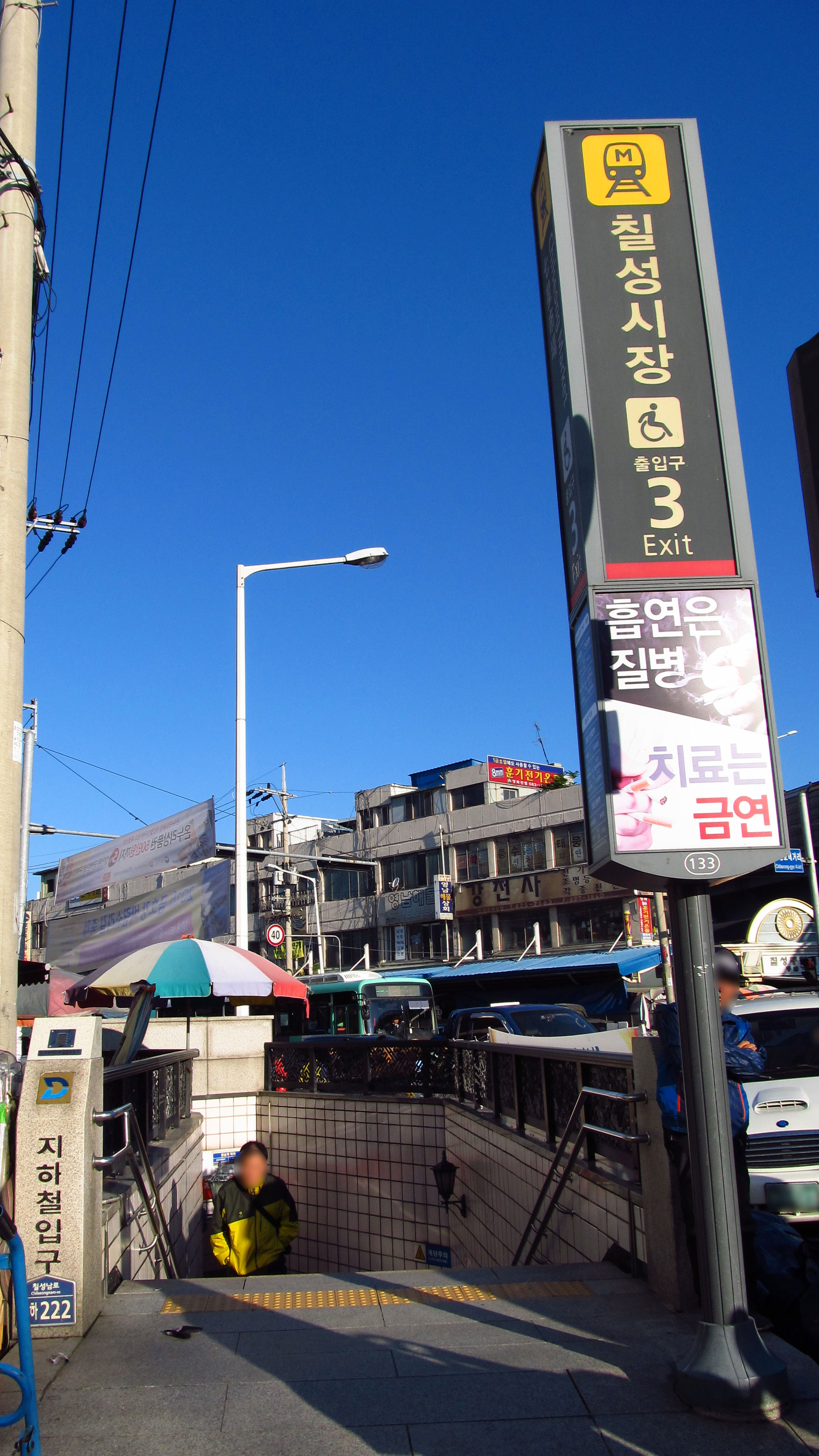
- A entrance, October 2016

Korean name
- Hangul: 칠성시장역
- Hanja: 七星市場驛
- Revised Romanization: Chilseongsijangnyeok
- McCune–Reischauer: Ch'ilsŏngsijangnyŏk

General information
- Location: Chilseong-dong, Buk District, Daegu; South Korea
- Coordinates: 35°52′34″N 128°36′18″E
- Operator: DTRO
- Line: Daegu Metro Line 1
- Platforms: 2
- Tracks: 2

Construction
- Structure type: Underground

Other information
- Station code: 133

History
- Opened: May 2, 1998
Location

Chilseong Market Station is a station of the first line of Daegu, South Korea. It is located in Chilseong Market.

Preceding station	Daegu Metro	Following station
Daegu Station towards Seolhwa–Myeonggok	Line 1	Sincheon towards Hayang
