= Gimcheon(Gumi) station =

Train station in South Korea

김천(구미)
Gimcheon(Gumi)
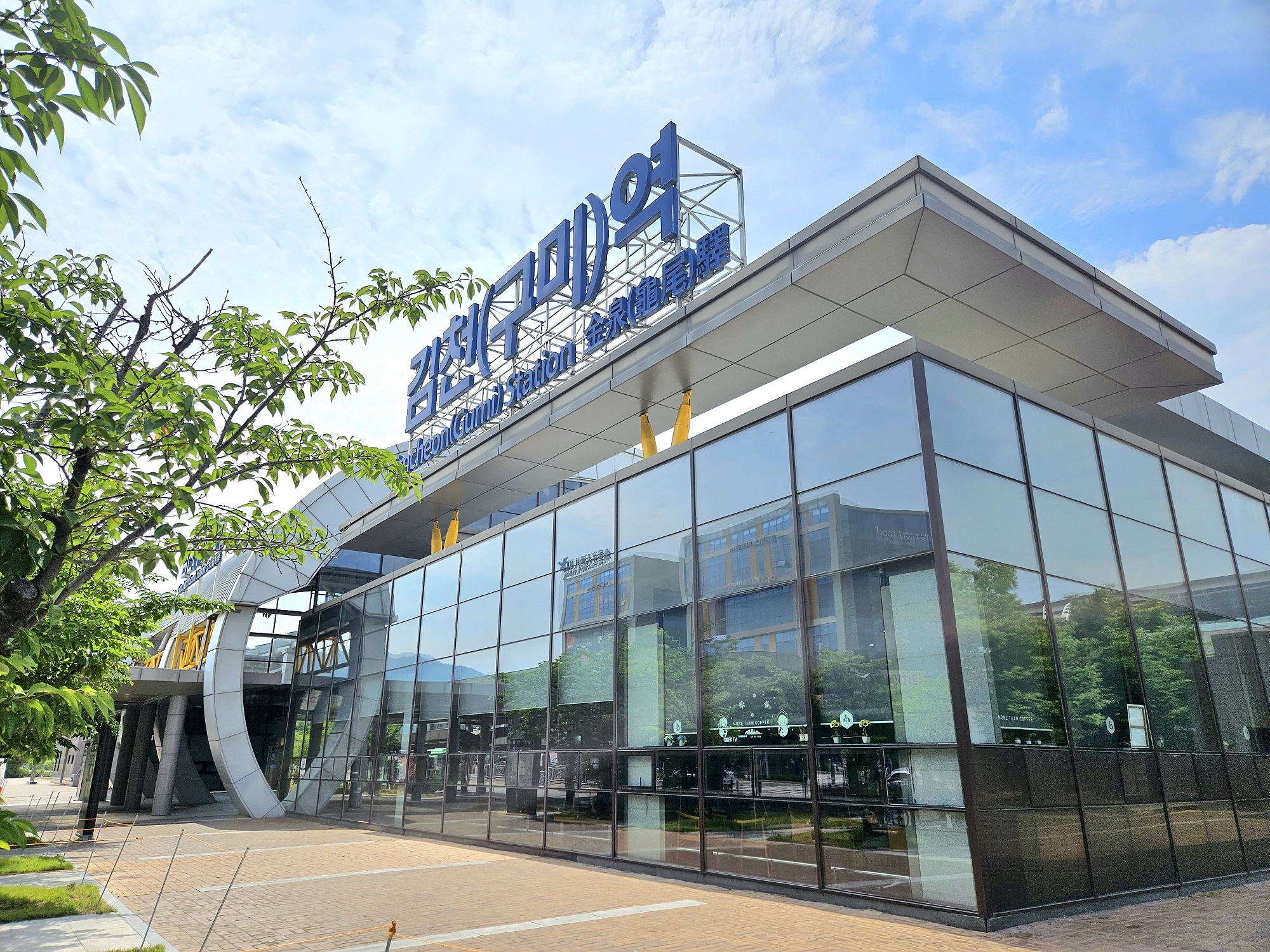

Korean name
- Hangul: 김천(구미)역
- Hanja: 金泉(龜尾)驛
- Revised Romanization: Gimcheon(Gumi)-yeok
- McCune–Reischauer: Kimch'ŏn(Kumi)-yŏk

General information
- Location: 51 Hyeoksin 1-ro, Nam-myeon, Gimcheon-si, Gyeongsangbuk-do; South Korea
- Coordinates: 36°06′47″N 128°10′49″E
- Operator: Korail
- Line: Gyeongbu High Speed Railway

Construction
- Structure type: Aboveground

History
- Opened: November 1, 2010

Services
| Preceding station | Korea Train Express | Following station |
|---|---|---|
| Daejeon towards Haengsin, Seoul or Suseo | Gyeongbu KTX | Seodaegu towards Busan |
| Daejeon towards Haengsin or Suseo | Gyeongjeon KTX | Seodaegu towards Jinju |
| Daejeon towards Haengsin | Donghae KTX | Seodaegu towards Pohang |
| Daejeon towards Suseo | Donghae KTX | Dongdaegu towards Pohang |
Location
- Location within South Korea

Gimcheon(Gumi) station is a Korea Train Express station on the Gyeongbu KTX Line in Gimcheon City, North Gyeongsang Province, servicing Gimcheon and the nearby industrial center of Gumi. Services began on November 1, 2010. Only select KTX trains stop at Gimcheon(Gumi).
