= Sasang station (Korail) =

Railway station in Busan, South Korea

사상
Sasang
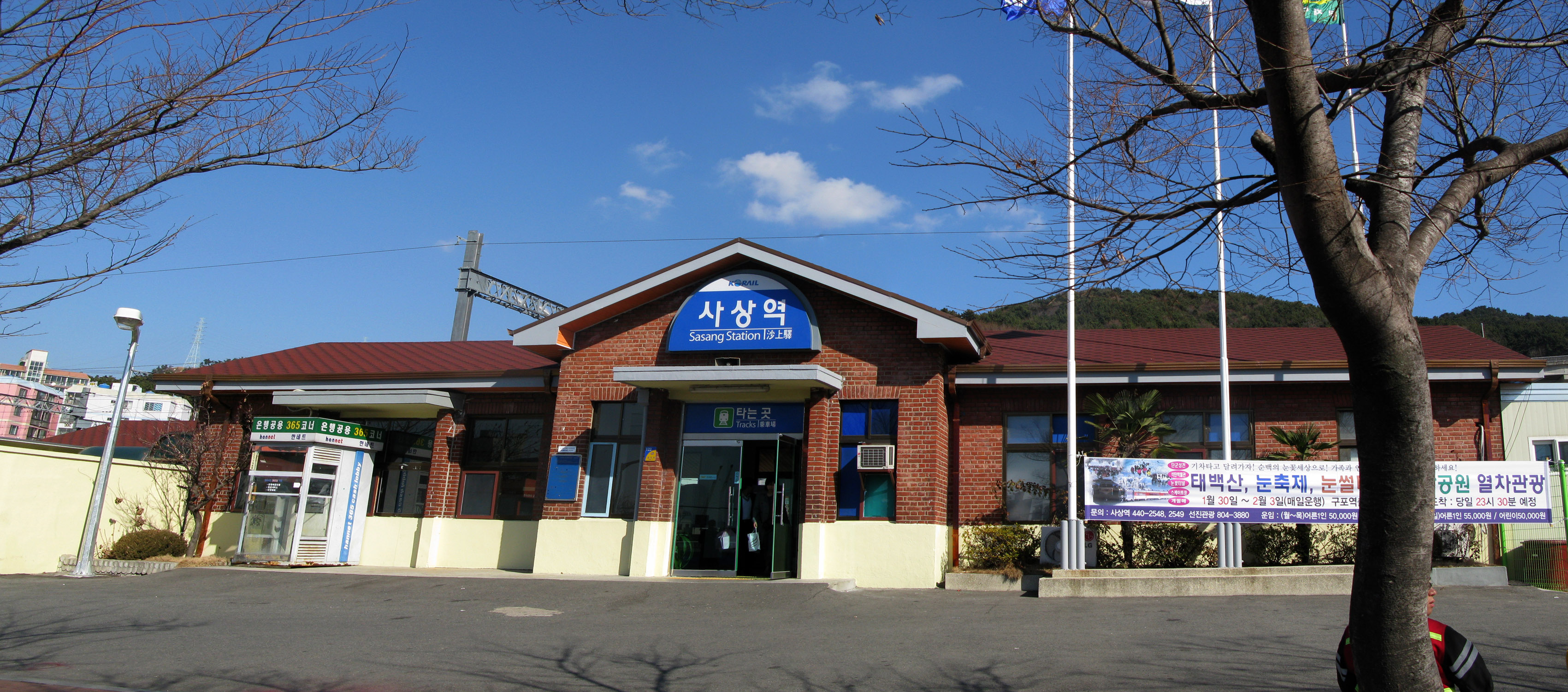
- Station building

Korean name
- Hangul: 사상역
- Hanja: 沙上驛
- Revised Romanization: Sasangnyeok
- McCune–Reischauer: Sasangnyŏk

General information
- Location: Gwaebeop-dong, Sasang District, Busan; South Korea
- Coordinates: 35°9′45.04″N 128°59′20.16″E
- Operator: Korail
- Lines: Gyeongbu Line; Gaya Line
- Platforms: 2
- Tracks: 4

Construction
- Structure type: Aboveground
- Accessible: yes

History
- Opened: November 1, 1928。
- Original company: Chosen Government Railway

Services
Preceding station	Korail	Following station
Gupo towards Dongdaegu	ITX-Saemaeul Gyeongbu Line	Busan Terminus
Gupo towards Daejeon	ITX-Maum Gyeongbu Line	Busan Terminus
Gupo towards Seoul	Mugunghwa-ho Gyeongbu Line	Busan Terminus
Bujeon Terminus	Mugunghwa-ho Gyeongjeon Line	Gupo towards Suncheon
Bujeon Terminus	Mugunghwa-ho Mokpo–Boseong Line	Gupo towards Mokpo
Location

Sasang station is a railway station of the Gyeongbu Line and Gaya Line of Korail located in Gwaebeop-dong, Sasang District, Busan. It is also served by Mugunghwa-ho trains on the Gyeongbu Line.
