= Paldal Market station =

Station of the Daegu Metro

324 팔달시장 Paldal Market
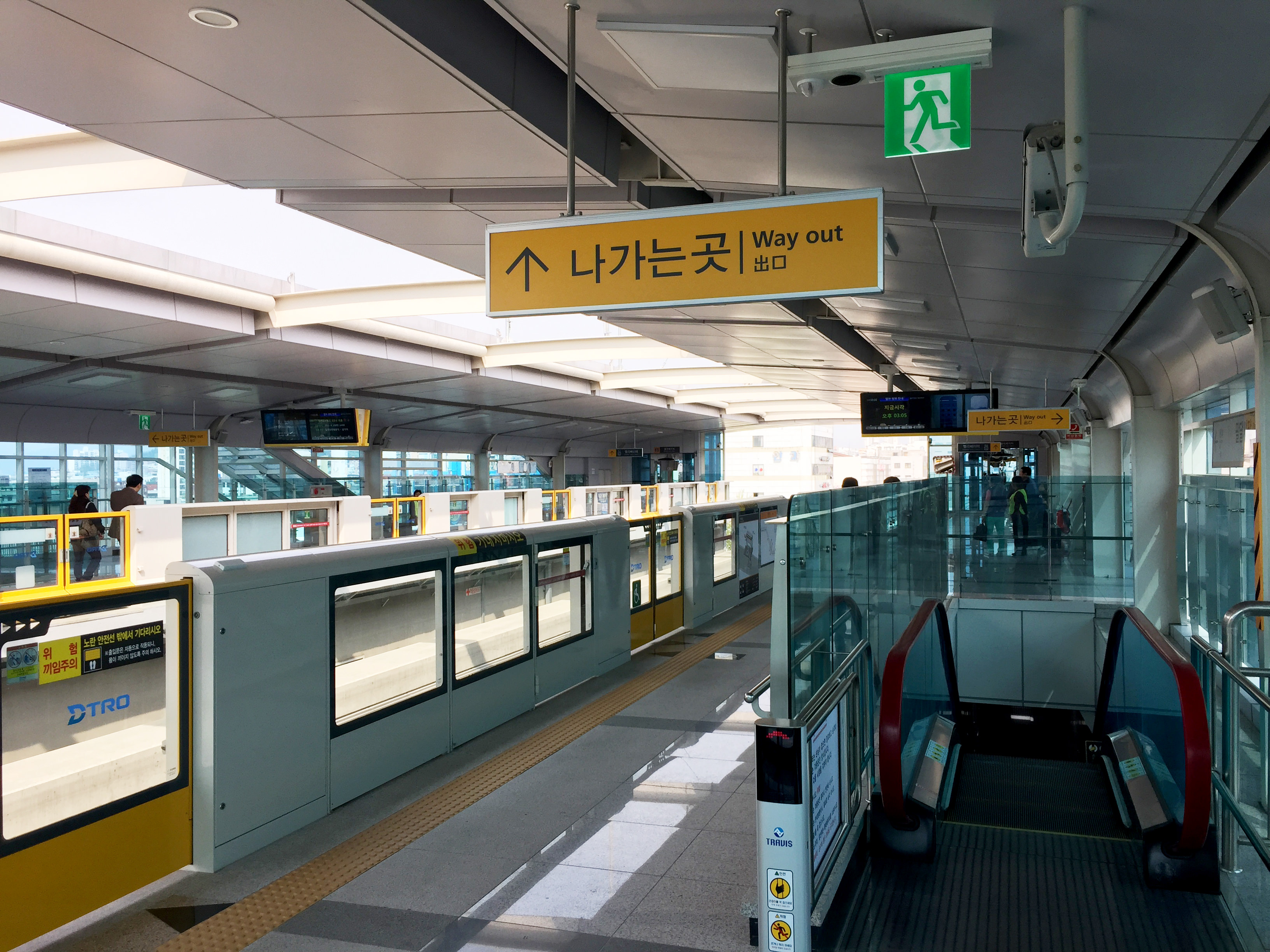
- The platforms in 2015

Korean name
- Hangul: 팔달시장역
- Hanja: 八達市場驛
- Revised Romanization: Paldal sijang yeok
- McCune–Reischauer: P'altal sijang yŏk

General information
- Location: Nowon-dong, Buk District, Daegu; South Korea
- Coordinates: 35°53′20″N 128°34′04″E
- Operator: DTRO
- Line: Daegu Metro Line 3
- Platforms: 2
- Tracks: 2

Construction
- Structure type: Overground

Other information
- Station code: 324

History
- Opened: April 23, 2015
Location

Paldal Market Station is a station of the Daegu Metro Line 3 in Nowon-dong, Buk District, Daegu, South Korea.

Preceding station	Daegu Metro	Following station
Manpyeong towards Chilgok Kyungpook National University Medical Center	Line 3	Wondae towards Yongji
