= Dongcheon station =

Dongcheon Station (Korean: 동천역; Hanja: 東川驛) is the name of several metro stations in South Korea.

- Dongcheon Station (Yongin)
- Dongcheon Station (Daegu)
