= Daegyeong Line =

Railway line in South Korea

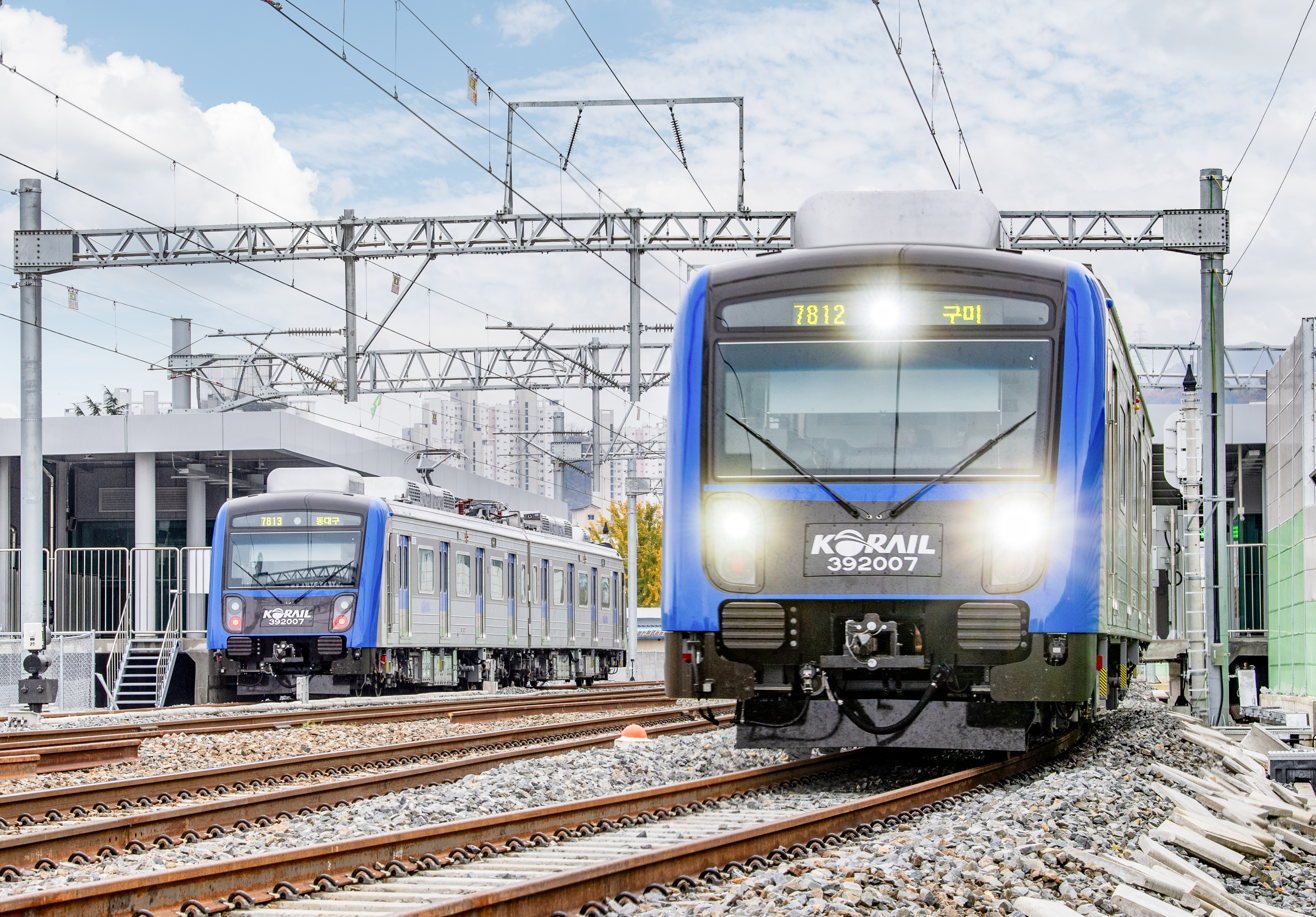
- Korail Class 392000

Overview
- Native name: 대경선(大慶線); Daegyeong-seon
- Status: Operational
- Owner: Daegu City Government
- Locale: Daegu; North Gyeongsang Province
- Termini: Gumi; Gyeongsan
- Stations: 8

Service
- Type: Commuter rail
- System: Daegu Metro
- Operator: Korail

History
- Opened: 14 December 2024

Technical
- Line length: 61.8 km (38.4 mi)
- Num of tracks: 2
- Track gauge: 1,435 mm (4 ft 8 1/2 in)
- Electrification: 25 kV AC 60 Hz
- Operating speed: 100 km/h (62 mph)
- Signalling: Hyundai Rotem KTCS-2

The Daegyeong Line (Korean: 대경선) is a commuter rail service of the Daegu Metropolitan Subway system which connects the cities of Gumi, Daegu, and Gyeongsan. Services are operated by Korail on the existing Gyeongbu Line.

== History ==
The line opened for service on 14 December 2024. Construction of the line began in 2019 and cost ₩209 billion.

Buksam station opened on 28 February 2026.

=== Future plans ===
There are additional plans to extend the line 22.9 km (14.2 mi) north from Gumi to Gimcheon.

== Rolling stock ==
Nine 2-car Korail Class 392000 EMU trainsets.

== Operations ==
Services on the Daegyeong Line will be supplemented by existing Mugunghwa workings between Gumi and Gyeongsan. Trains arrive every 15 minutes during rush hour and every 20 minutes at all other times. The maximum speed on the line is 100 km/h (62 mph). A trip from Gumi to Gyeongsan takes approximately 48 minutes.

The Daegyeong Line utilises a signalling system known as KTCS-2 which was developed by Hyundai Rotem.

== Stations ==
The line is 61.8 km (38.4 mi) in length.

Station Number	Station Name English	Station Name Hangul	Transfer	Distance in km	Total Distance
K110	Gumi	구미		---	0.0
K111	Sagok	사곡		4.5	4.5
K112	Buksam	북삼		5.3	9.8
K113	Waegwan	왜관		9.5	19.3
K114	Waegwan Gongdan (TBD)	왜관공단			
K115	Seodaegu	서대구	Gyeongbu	22.9	42.2
K116	Wondae (2028)	원대	Daegu Metro Line 3		
K117	Daegu	대구	Gyeongbu	4.2	46.4
K118	Dongdaegu	동대구	Gyeongbu	3.2	49.6
K119	Gyeongsan	경산	Gyeongbu	12.2	61.8
