= Gususan Library =

Library located at Buk District, Daegu, South Korea

- 35.93897714348525°N 128.5523812693835°E
- Location: Daegu, South Korea
- Established: 2009

Other information
- Website: library.daegu.go.kr/bukgs/index.do

Korean name
- Hangul: 구수산도서관
- Hanja: 龜首山圖書館
- RR: Gususan doseogwan
- MR: Kususan tosŏgwan

Gususan Library (Korean: 구수산도서관) is a library located at Buk District, Daegu, South Korea. The library consists of a basement and three floors.

The establishment of the library was completed on January 21, 2009, and the opening ceremony was held on May 25, 2009.

== Scale ==
It consists of one basement floor and three floors above the ground. It is a district library with more than 100,000 books and 544 seats.
