= Guam station (Daegu Metro) =

Station of the Daegu Metro

317 구암 (과학대·보건대입구) Guam (Taegu Science Univ.·Daegu Health College)
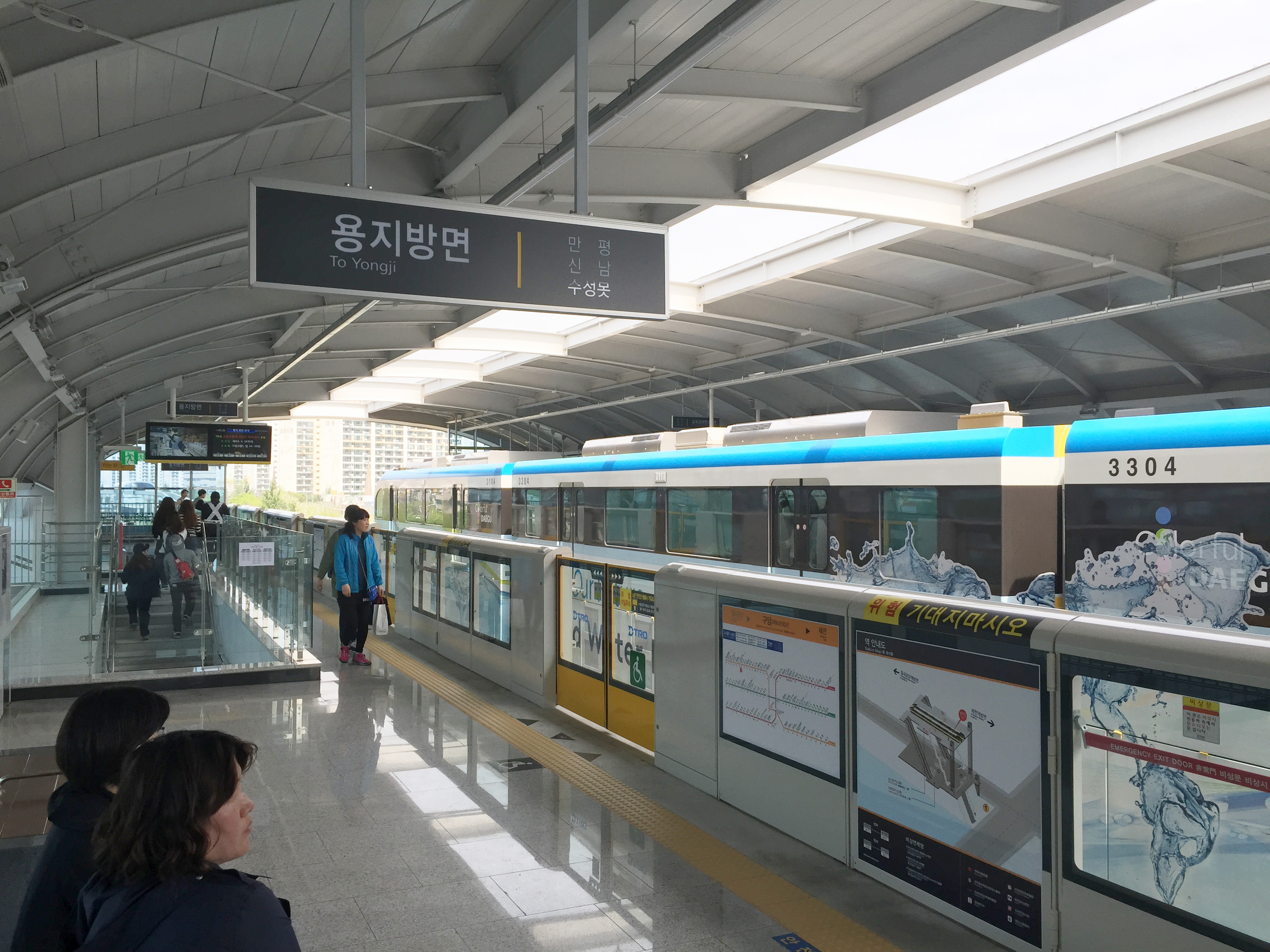

Korean name
- Hangul: 구암역
- Hanja: 鳩岩驛
- Revised Romanization: Guam yeok
- McCune–Reischauer: Kuak yŏk

General information
- Location: Dongcheon-dong, Buk District, Daegu; South Korea
- Coordinates: 35°55′33″N 128°33′01″E
- Operator: DTRO
- Platforms: 2
- Tracks: 2

Construction
- Structure type: Overground

Other information
- Station code: 317

History
- Opened: April 23, 2015
Location

Guam (Taegu Science University·Daegu Health College) Station is a station of the Daegu Metro Line 3 in Dongcheon-dong, Buk District, Daegu, South Korea.

Preceding station	Daegu Metro	Following station
Chilgok-Unam towards Chilgok Kyungpook National University Medical Center	Line 3	Taejeon towards Yongji
