= Daehyeon-dong, Daegu =

Daehyeon-dong
- Interactive map of Daehyeon-dong
- Country: South Korea

Korean name
- Hangul: 대현동
- Hanja: 大賢洞
- RR: Daehyeon-dong
- MR: Taehyŏn-dong

Daehyeon-dong (Korean: 대현동) is a legal dong (neighborhood) of the Buk District, Daegu, South Korea. In 2022, Pakistani students from Kyungpook National University wanted to renovate a house where they pray into a mosque in Daehyeon-dong and caused local protests.
