= Kyungpook National University Museum =

South Korean archeological museum

- Hangul: 경북대학교 박물관
- Hanja: 慶北大學校博物館
- RR: Gyeongbuk daehakgyo bangmulgwan
- MR: Kyŏngbuk taehakkyo pangmulgwan

Kyungpook National University Museum is an archaeological museum located in Buk District, Daegu, South Korea. The museum opened on 28 May 1959 on the thirteenth anniversary of the opening of the university. The area of the exhibition hall is 5,488 m^{2} and the outdoor exhibition area of 13,824 m^{2}. Since its opening in 1959, intending to collect, store, exhibit, and research relics from prehistoric to modern times, the Kyungpook National University Museum has played a pivotal role as a cultural facility in the Gyeong-buk region. The Museum recently surveyed Korean cultural relics, and held a special exhibition to promote education in history and culture, provide the community with a greater understanding of the lifestyles and experiences of the past, and broaden perspectives on Korean society and culture.
