= Chilseong Market =

Traditional market in Daegu, South Korea

- Location: 198 Chilseongnam-ro, Buk District, Daegu, South Korea; 35.8766°N 128.6044°E
- Website: www.7stamall.kr (in Korean)
- Interactive map of Chilseong Market

Chilseong Market (Korean: 칠성시장; Hanja: 七星市場), officially Chilsung Market, is a traditional market in Chilseong-dong, Buk District, Daegu, South Korea.

A market existed in the area before the 1945 liberation of Korea. In 1946, it was made a formal market under the name Bungmun Market (북문시장). It grew in size and prominence during the Korean War, as refugees crowded the area. In 1974, Bungmun Market was split into Chilseong Market, Daegu Fruit and Vegetable Market (대구청과시장), and Samsung Market. Concurrently, various shopping malls began to arise in the area; by the 1990s Chilseong Market was declining. In response to this, in 1997 local market leaders established a cooperative to renovate the market. In 2006, the government promulgated an act to modernize markets like Chilseong Market.

The market contains around 308 stores and 84 street stalls. It has visitor facilities like an information center, restrooms, parking, security, ATMs, bicycle storage, and public Wi-Fi.
