= Gumi station =

Train station in South Korea

구미
Gumi
구미; Gumi
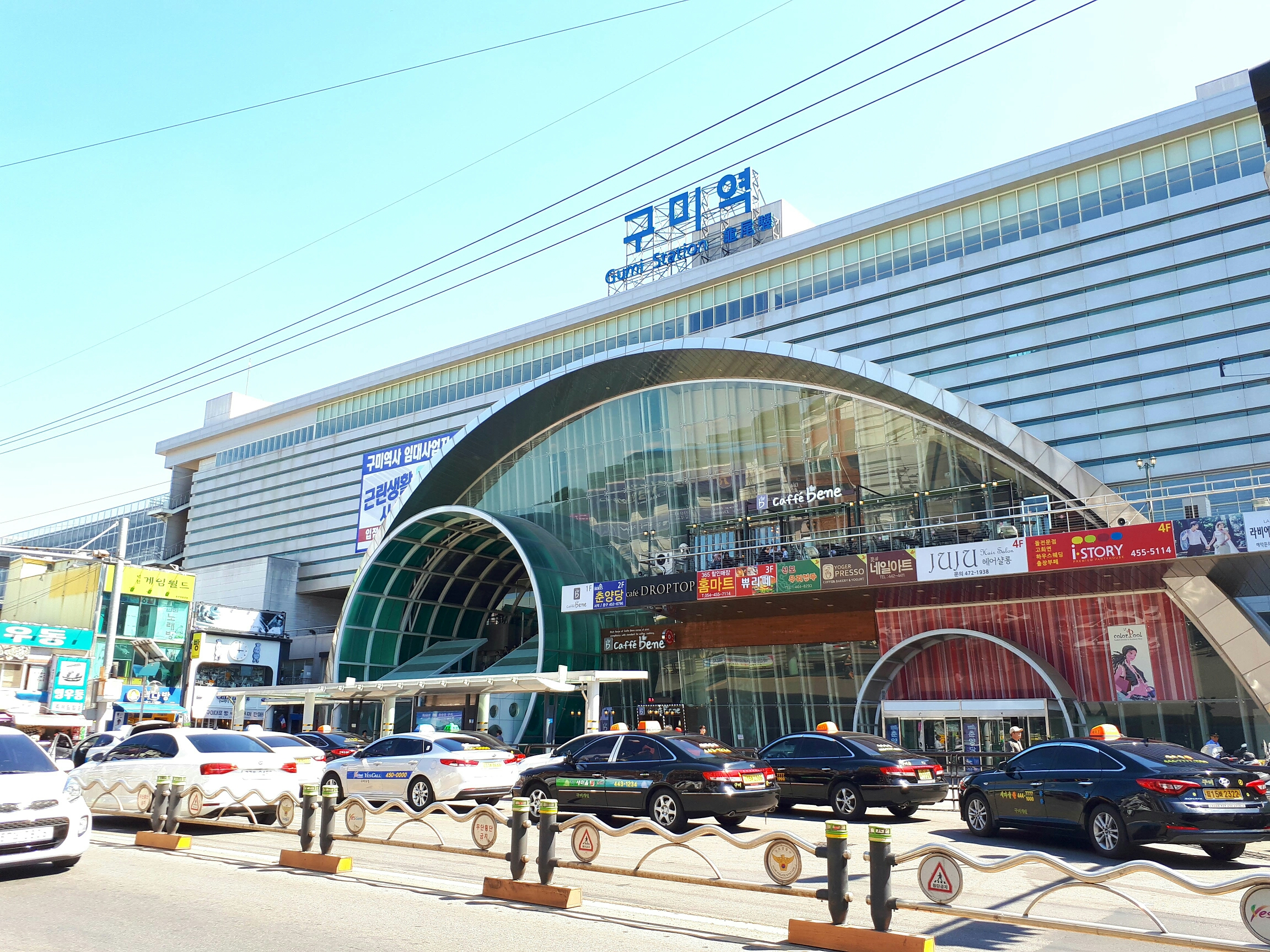

Korean name
- Hangul: 구미역
- Hanja: 龜尾驛
- Revised Romanization: Gumiyeok
- McCune–Reischauer: Kumiyŏk

General information
- Location: Wonpyeong-dong, Gumi, North Gyeongsang; South Korea
- Coordinates: 36°7′43.57″N 128°19′46.64″E
- Operator: Korail
- Lines: Gyeongbu Line; Daegyeong Line

Construction
- Structure type: Aboveground

History
- Opened: November 1, 1916

Services
Preceding station	Korail	Following station
Gimcheon towards Seoul	ITX-Saemaeul Gyeongbu Line	Waegwan towards Busan
Gimcheon towards Seoul	ITX-Saemaeul Gyeongjeon Line	Waegwan towards Jinju
Gimcheon towards Seoul	ITX-Maum Gyeongbu Line	Waegwan towards Busan
Gimcheon towards Daejeon or Seoul	Mugunghwa-ho Gyeongbu Line	Yangmok towards Busan
Waegwan towards Dongdaegu	Mugunghwa-ho Chungbuk Line	Gimcheon towards Yeongju
Preceding station	Daegu Metro	Following station
Terminus	Daegyeong Line	Sagok towards Gyeongsan
Location
Location within South Korea

Gumi station is a railway station on the Gyeongbu Line and the Daegyeong Line.

The train station on the Gyeongbu line is between Apo station and Sagok station. On November 1, 1916, the company started operation as a normal station. The station was renovated in 1966 and expanded in 1982. In 2006, the company built a new history of Gumi and stopped handling cargo operation in 2007. KTX, Saemaul and Mugunghwa trains are in operation, and are in charge of passenger and ticket issuance.

== History ==
November 1, 1916: Opened of business as a regular station (Registration 1916-253 of the Governor-General's Office of the Joseon)

October 12, 1966: Construction of a new history.

December 30, 1966: Completion of the construction of a new station.

December 14, 2024: Opened of Daegyeong Line.

== Nearby tourist spots ==
Nearby tourist attractions include:

- Geum-o mountain Provincial Park
- Dorisa (temple)
