= Kyungpook National University =

National university in Daegu, South Korea

Coordinates: 35°53′29″N 128°36′38″E

- 경북대학교
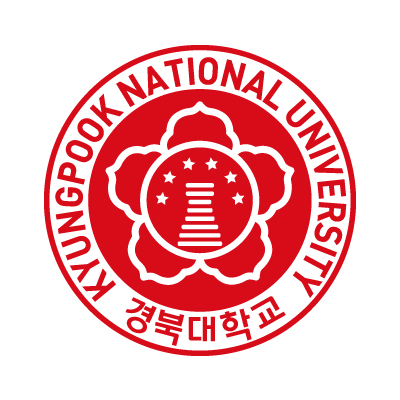
- Other name: KNU
- Motto: 진리, 긍지, 봉사 "Truth, Pride, Service"
- Type: National
- Established: 1946 (founded 1907)
- President: Hur Young Woo (허영우)
- Faculty: 1,233 full-time; 1,161 administrative staff (2023)
- Students: 36,277 (2025)
- Undergraduates: 29,488 (2025)
- Postgraduates: 6,789 (2025)
- Location: Daegu, South Korea
- Campus: Urban, Main campus at Daegu (Buk-gu); additional campuses at Sangju, Dongin, Chilgok, and Vietnam
- Colors: Red
- Nickname: Kyungdae (경대)
- Website: www.knu.ac.kr

- Kyungpook National University
- Hangul: 경북대학교
- Hanja: 慶北大學校
- RR: Gyeongbuk daehakgyo
- MR: Kyŏngbuk taehakkyo

Kyungpook National University (Korean: 경북대학교; Hanja: 慶北大學校; abbreviated as KNU or known as Kyungdae (경대; 慶大)) is a national university in Daegu, South Korea, and one of the ten Flagship Korean National Universities representing Gyeongsangbuk Province, of which Daegu was formerly the capital. The university traces its origins to a medical school founded in 1923 and was formally established in September 1946, and it today offers undergraduate and graduate programs across nineteen colleges and schools and fourteen graduate schools, including professional programs in medicine, dentistry, and veterinary medicine.

== History ==
The medical school that would later become part of Kyungpook National University traces its origins to 1923. The university itself was founded in September 1946, when the Colleges of Education, Medicine, and Agriculture in Daegu were upgraded and merged into a national college. In October 1951, these were joined by the Colleges of Liberal Arts and Sciences and of Law and Political Science to form Kyungpook National University in its unified structure. Additional colleges, including Engineering and Dentistry, were established in the years that followed, gradually shaping the university into its present form.

== Campus ==
Kyungpook National University operates across four campuses in the Daegu metropolitan area, North Gyeongsang Province, and an overseas branch in Vietnam.

=== Main campus ===
The main campus, established in 1946 in the Sangyeok-dong area of Buk-gu, houses the university's major engineering and natural science colleges together with its central administrative offices.

=== Sangju campus ===
The Sangju campus was integrated into Kyungpook National University in 2010. It comprises two colleges and nineteen departments, along with several graduate schools, and includes specialized facilities such as a ranch and an animal hospital.

=== Dongin medical campus ===
Located in central Daegu, the Dongin campus houses the university's schools of medicine, nursing, and dentistry. The School of Medicine, whose origins trace to 1923, recently marked its 100th anniversary, and works in coordination with Kyungpook National University Hospital, which provides clinical training for students.

=== Chilgok medical campus ===
Established in 2011, this campus focuses on medical services, particularly cancer treatment, geriatrics, and pediatrics.

=== KNU Vietnam ===
Established in 2026 in partnership with FPT University, it is the university's first overseas branch and the first franchise-style degree program operated abroad by a South Korean national university. Located in Hanoi and HCMC, it offers undergraduate programs in Technology and Business under KNU's curriculum, with degrees conferred by Kyungpook National University and the option for students to transfer to the Daegu campus during their studies. Classes are scheduled to begin in the second half of 2026.

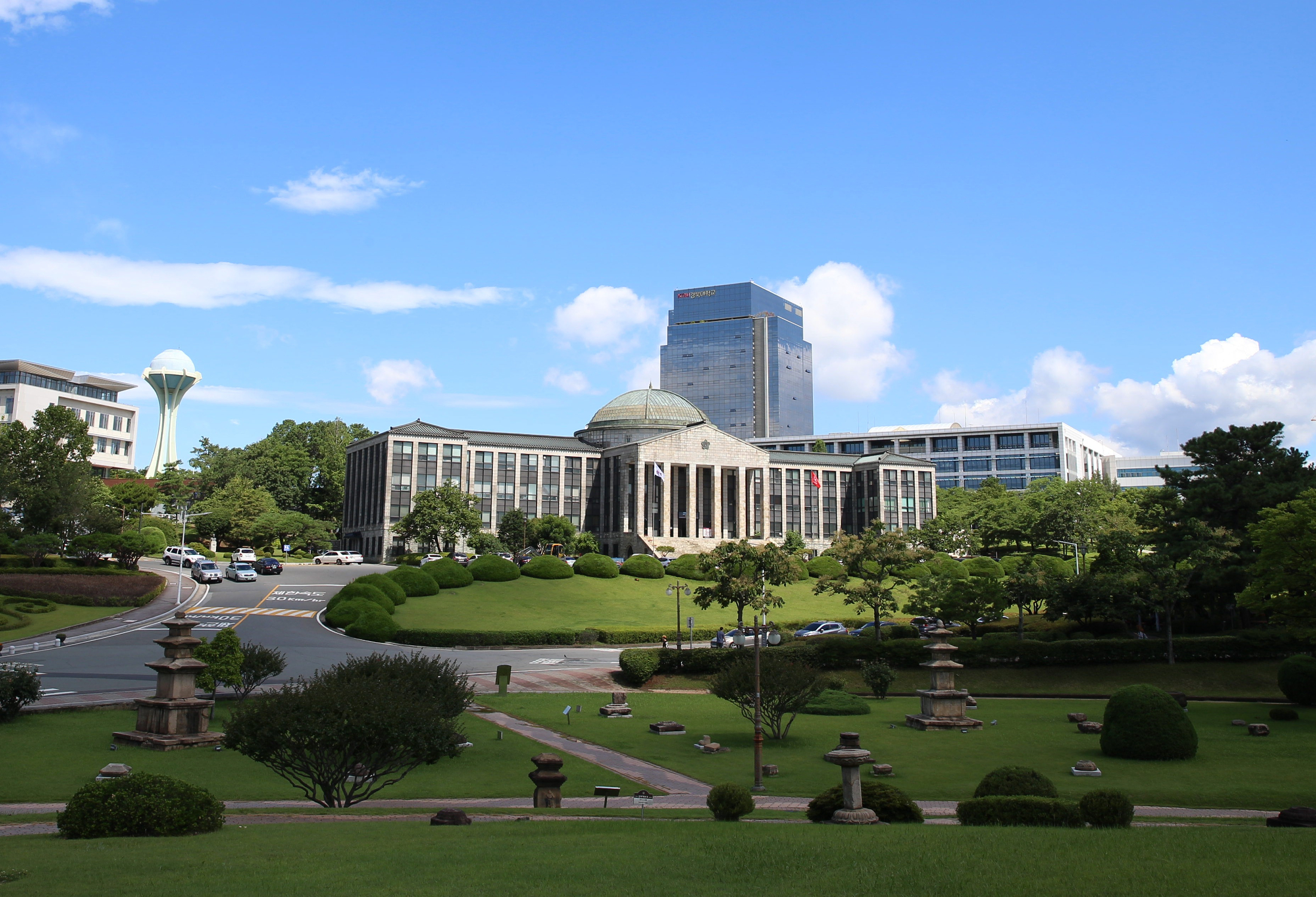
Daegu campus

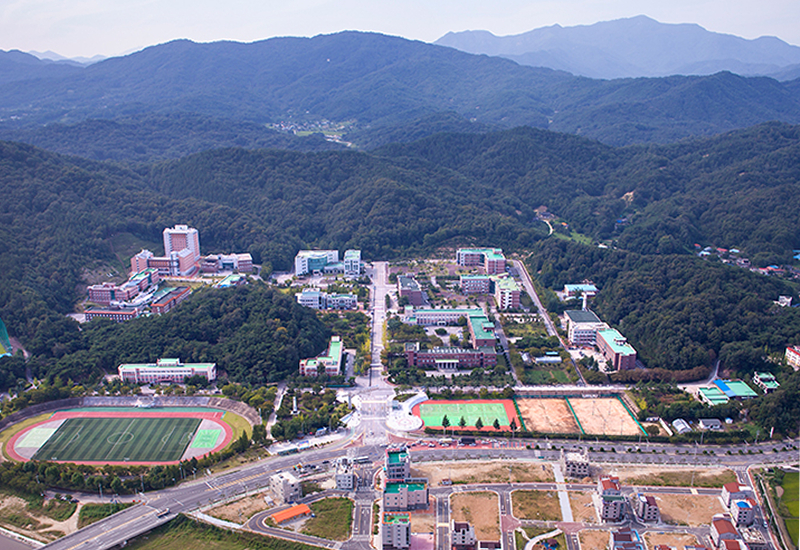
Sangju campus

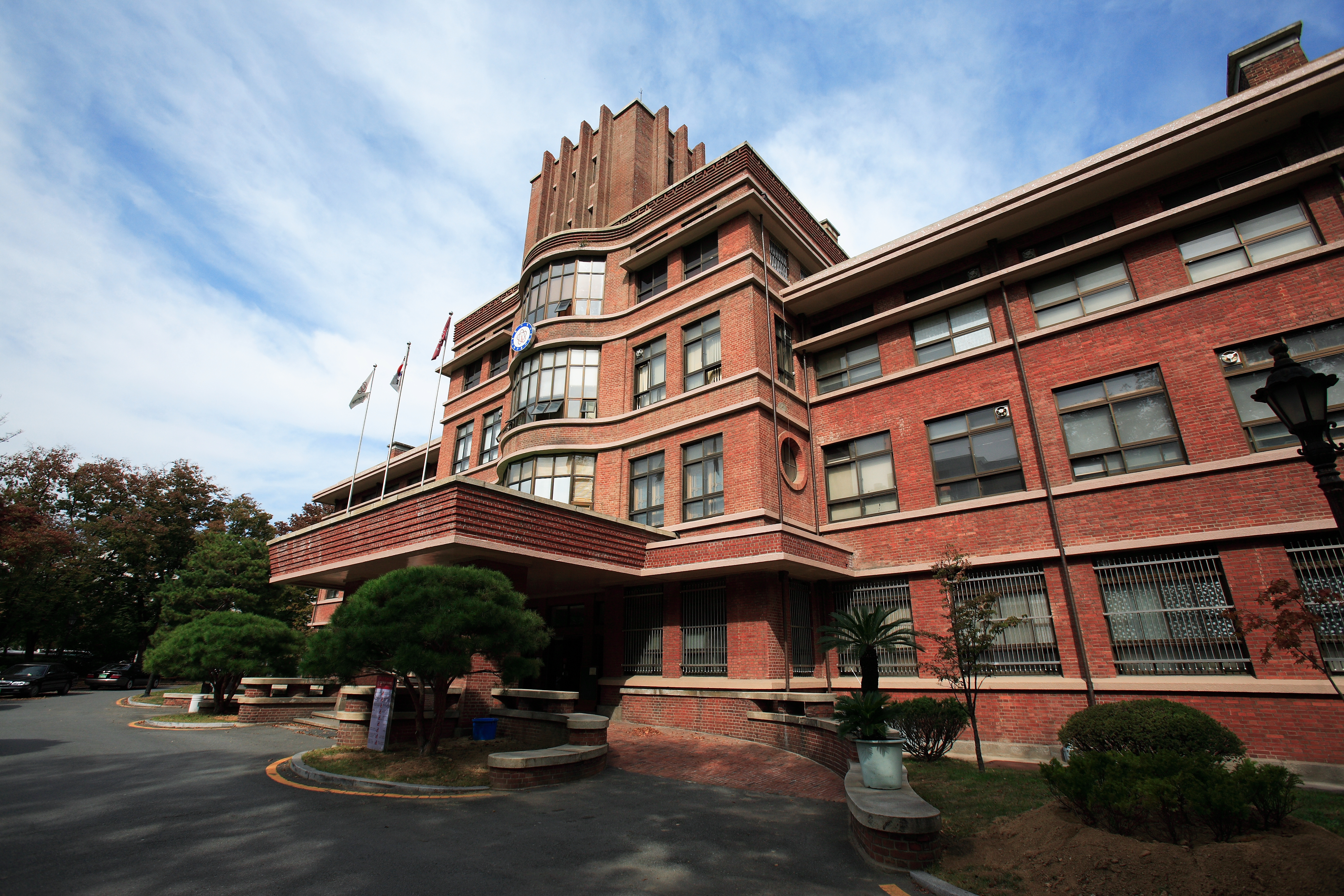
Dongin campus

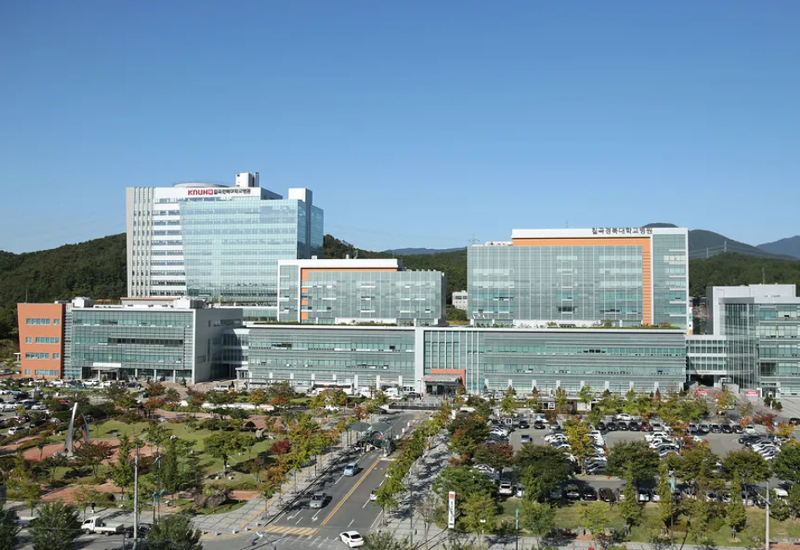
Chilgok campus

== Governance and administration ==
Kyungpook National University is led by its 20th president, Young Woo Hur, who has served in the role since June 2025. A graduate of KNU's College of Engineering, Hur earned his doctoral degree at the University of Florida in the United States. He is supported by two vice presidents, an Executive Vice President for Academic Affairs, Shi-Chul Lee, and a Vice President for Research and University-Industry Cooperation, Soonki Jung, along with approximately ten deans who oversee areas including academic affairs, student affairs, strategy and finance, research and industry collaboration, international affairs, admissions, external cooperation, information technology, education reform, and graduate school policy. The Office of General Administration is responsible for personnel, budget, and facilities management.

== Symbols ==
The symbolic animal of Kyungpook National University is the hobanwoo (칡소), a traditional Korean cattle breed marked with a tiger-like striped coat. The university adopted Hobanwoo as its official symbol in June 2014, following a public contest and preference survey among students, faculty, and alumni.

== Academics ==
Kyungpook National University comprises nineteen undergraduate colleges and schools, spanning the humanities, social sciences, natural sciences, economics and business administration, engineering, IT engineering, agriculture and life sciences, music and arts, teacher education, medicine, dentistry, veterinary medicine, human ecology, nursing, pharmacy, advanced technology convergence, ecology and environmental science, science and technology, and public administration, together with a track for undeclared majors. Graduate education is offered through fourteen graduate schools, including dedicated programs in business administration, education, forensic and investigative science, international studies, public administration, public health, data science, and law, among others. The university also operates a philosophy, politics and economics (PPE) programme.

== Rankings ==
University rankings
JoongAng National	Domestic	=20
QS National	General	15
THE National	General	14–17
ARWU National	Research	9–12
QS Asia (Asia version)	General	=101
THE Asia (Asia version)	General	91
ARWU World	Research	401–500
QS World	General	=519
THE World	General	501–600
USNWR World	General	=763

In rankings published in 2024, Kyungpook National University placed in the 501–600 band worldwide, 14th in South Korea, and first among the country's national universities, in the Times Higher Education (THE) World University Rankings, and 39th worldwide, 3rd in South Korea, and first among national universities, in the THE University Impact Rankings. The university ranked 516th worldwide, 15th in South Korea, and first among national universities, in the 2024 QS World University Rankings, and 401st–500th worldwide, 9th–12th in South Korea, in the 2024 Shanghai Ranking's Academic Ranking of World Universities (ARWU). The Center for World University Rankings (CWUR) placed the university 420th worldwide and 10th in South Korea, first among national universities, in 2024.

== See also ==
- Kyungpook National University Museum
- Flagship Korean National Universities
- List of national universities in South Korea
- List of universities and colleges in South Korea
- Education in South Korea
