= Dongdaegu station =

Railway station in Daegu, South Korea

동대구
Dongdaegu
동대구; Dongdaegu
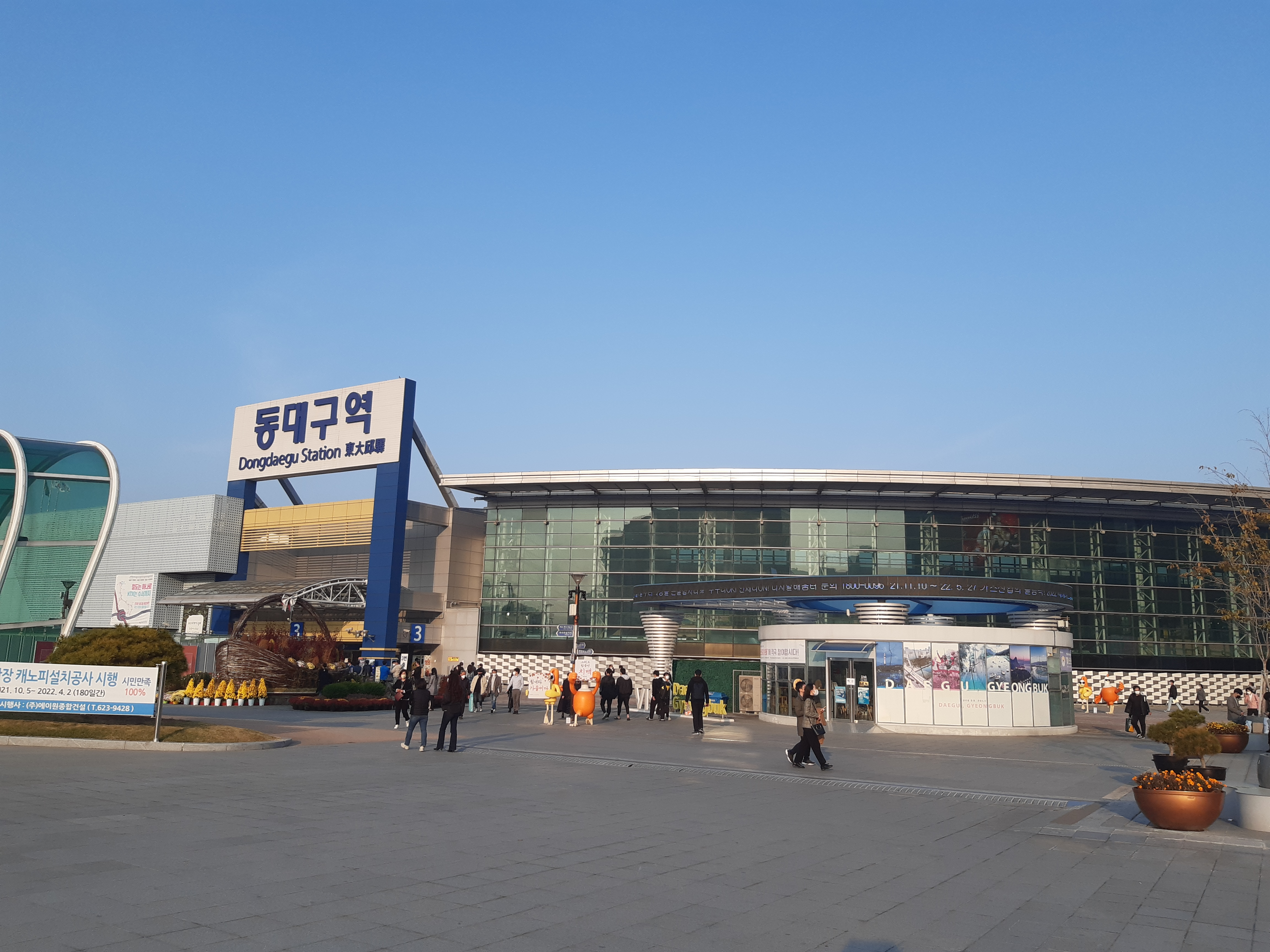

Korean name
- Hangul: 동대구역
- Hanja: 東大邱驛
- RR: Dongdaegu-yeok
- MR: Tongdaegu-yŏk

General information
- Location: 550 Dongdaegu-ro, Dong District, Daegu; South Korea
- Coordinates: 35°52′47.00″N 128°37′45.18″E
- Operator: Korail
- Lines: Gyeongbu Line; Gyeongbu High Speed Railway; Daegyeong Line
- Platforms: 7
- Tracks: 14

Construction
- Structure type: Aboveground / Straight

History
- Opened: June 10, 1969; 57 years ago

Services
Preceding station	Korea Train Express	Following station
Seodaegu towards Haengsin or Suseo	Gyeongbu KTX	Gyeongju towards Busan
Gimcheon(Gumi) towards Seoul	Gyeongbu KTX	Gyeongju towards Busan
Seodaegu towards Haengsin	Gyeongbu KTX via Gupo	Gyeongsan towards Busan
Seodaegu towards Suseo	Gyeongbu KTX via Gupo	Miryang towards Busan
Seodaegu towards Haengsin	Gyeongjeon KTX	Gyeongsan towards Jinju
Seodaegu towards Suseo	Gyeongjeon KTX	Miryang towards Jinju
Seodaegu towards Haengsin	Donghae KTX	Pohang Terminus
Gimcheon(Gumi) towards Suseo	Donghae KTX	Pohang Terminus
Preceding station	Korail	Following station
Daegu towards Seoul	ITX-Saemaeul Gyeongbu Line	Gyeongsan towards Busan
Daegu towards Seoul	ITX-Saemaeul Gyeongjeon Line	Cheongdo towards Jinju
Daegu towards Seoul	ITX-Maum Gyeongbu Line	Gyeongsan towards Busan
Terminus	ITX-Maum Gyeongjeon Line	Gyeongsan towards Jinju
Terminus	ITX-Maum Donghae Line	Hayang towards Bujeon
Hayang towards Gangneung	ITX-Maum Donghae Line	Terminus
Daegu towards Daejeon or Seoul	Mugunghwa-ho Gyeongbu Line	Gyeongsan towards Busan
Terminus	Mugunghwa-ho Gyeongjeon Line	Gyeongsan towards Jinju
Terminus	Mugunghwa-ho Donghae Line	Hayang towards Bujeon or Pohang
Hayang towards Donghae	Mugunghwa-ho Yeongdong Line	Terminus
Terminus	Mugunghwa-ho Chungbuk Line	Daegu towards Yeongju
Terminus	Nuriro Donghae Line	Hayang towards Gangneung or Taehwagang
Preceding station	Daegu Metro	Following station
Daegu towards Gumi	Daegyeong Line	Gyeongsan Terminus
Location

135 동대구역 Dongdaegu Station
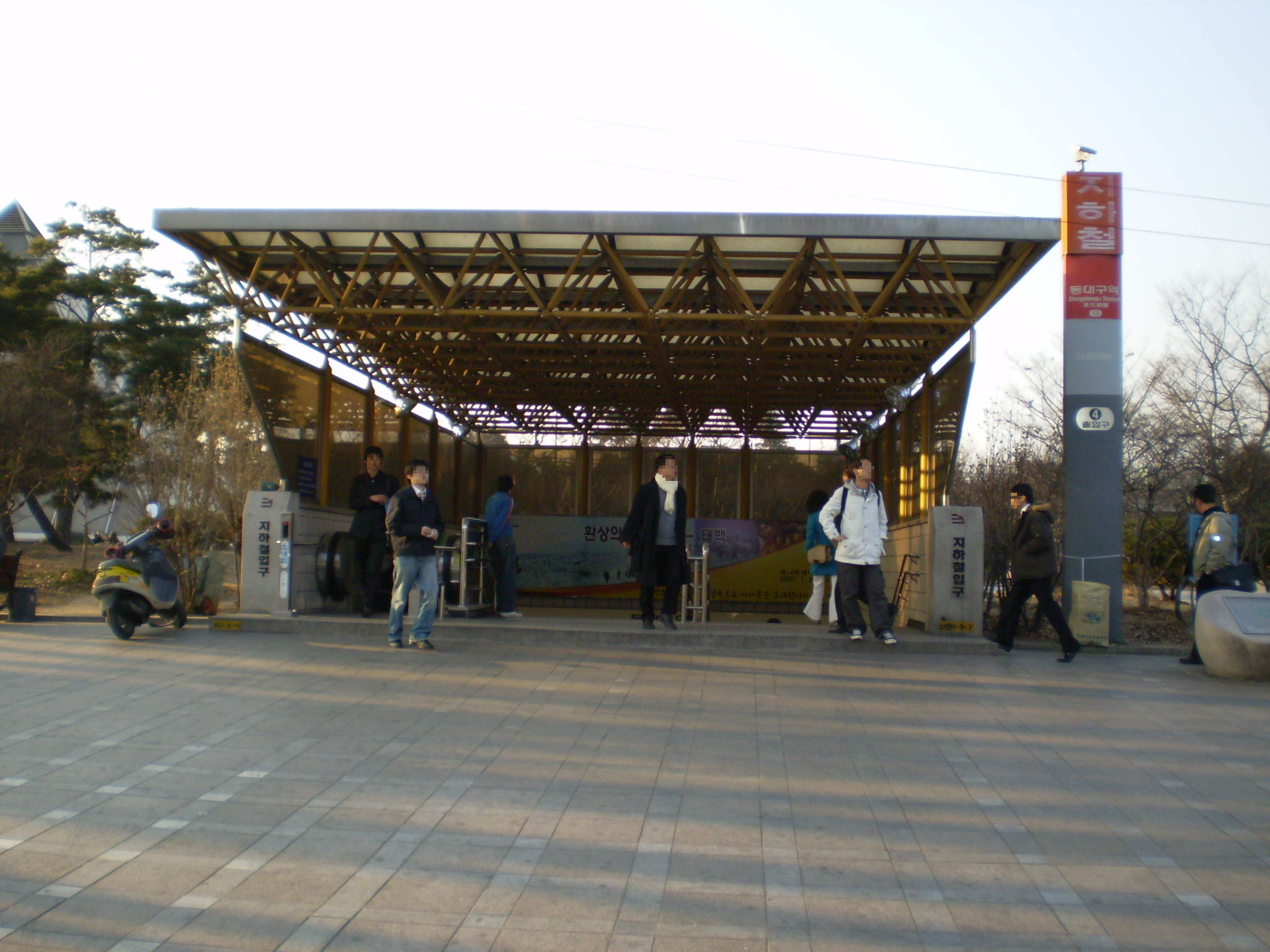

General information
- Location: B530 Dongdaegu-ro, Dong District, Daegu
- Coordinates: 35°52′41″N 128°37′40″E
- Operator: Daegu Transportation Corporation
- Line: Line 1
- Platforms: 2
- Tracks: 2

Construction
- Structure type: Underground

Other information
- Station code: 135

History
- Opened: May 2, 1998; 28 years ago

Services
Preceding station	Daegu Metro	Following station
Sincheon towards Seolhwa–Myeonggok	Line 1	Dong-gu Office towards Hayang
Location

Dongdaegu Station (Korean: 동대구역), meaning "East Daegu station", is a railway station in Daegu, South Korea. It is on the national high-speed KTX railway network, 282 km (175 mi) south of Seoul Station.

== History ==
The station opened in 1962 and KTX trains on the Gyeongbu high-speed railway began services on April 1, 2004, shortly after the completion of the new building earlier that year.

== Services ==
Dongdaegu has become the main station in Daegu, surpassing Daegu Station.

=== Overground ===
Dongdaegu station serves all KTX trains on the Gyeongbu high-speed railway. It also has express services and local services on the normal speed Gyeongbu Line. The station is served by the Daegu Line, a short line which connects to the Jungang Line.

=== Subway ===
The station also serves the Daegu Subway. The overground railway and subway stations are not connected directly: the Subway Line 1 station entrance lies in a park close by the railway station.

== Popular culture ==
Dongdaegu station features in the 2016 zombie horror film Train to Busan.

== See also ==
- Transportation in South Korea
- Korail
- KTX
