= Buk District, Daegu =

District of Daegu, South Korea

Coordinates: 35.89°N 128.58°E

Buk
- Autonomous District
- Flag

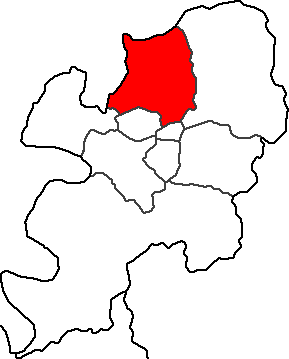
- Country: South Korea
- Region: Yeongnam
- Provincial level: Daegu
- Administrative divisions: 23 administrative dong

Government
  - Mayor: Lee Geun-su (이근수) (People Power)

Area
  - Total: 93.98 km^{2} (36.29 sq mi)

Population (September 2024)
  - Total: 414,883
  - Density: 4,427/km^{2} (11,470/sq mi)
  - Dialect: Gyeongsang
- Website: Buk District Office

Korean name
- Hangul: 북구
- Hanja: 北區
- RR: Buk-gu
- MR: Puk-ku

Administrative divisions

Buk District (Korean: 북구; lit. 'north district') is a district in northwestern Daegu, South Korea. It adjoins Chilgok County on the north. The area is 93.99 km^{2}. The population is about 414,883.

Buk District was first created as an office of Daegu in 1938, during the period of Japanese rule. It was raised to the status of a district in 1963. For most of the twentieth century, Buk District was purely an administrative division of Daegu, without any local autonomy. The first district council was inaugurated in 1991, and the first district head was elected in 1995, as part of nationwide local government reforms.

Kyungpook National University and Yeungjin College are located in Buk District.

== History ==
During the Silla period, it belonged to Daegu and palgeori prefectures, and during the Later Three Kingdoms period, it belonged to Daegu and Pali. During the Joseon period, it was located on the border of Daegu. In January 1963, it was upgraded to the status of Buk District. In 1981, as Daegu rose to a direct city, its status was raised to Buk District, Daegu.

== Administrative divisions ==
Buk-gu administers 23 dong:

- Goseong-dong (고성동)
- Chilseong-dong (칠성동)
- Chimsan 1-dong (침산1동)
- Chimsan 2-dong (침산2동)
- Chimsan 3-dong (침산3동)
- Nowon-dong (노원동)
- Sangyeok 1-dong (산격1동)
- Sangyeok 2-dong (산격2동)
- Sangyeok 3-dong (산격3동)
- Sangyeok 4-dong (산격4동)
- Bokhyeon 1-dong (복현1동)
- Bokhyeon 2-dong (복현2동)
- Daehyeon-dong (대현동)
- Geomdan-dong (검단동)
- Mutaejoya-dong (무태조야동)
- Gwanmun-dong (관문동)
- Taejeon 1-dong (태전1동)
- Taejeon 2-dong (태전2동)
- Guam-dong (구암동)
- Gwaneum-dong (관음동)
- Eumnae-dong (읍내동)
- Dongcheon-dong (동천동)
- Gugu-dong (국우동)

== Education ==
- Kyungpook National University
- Yeungjin University
- Taegu Science University
- Daegu Health College
- KyungWoon University Daegu Campus

== Amenities ==
- Bukbu Library
- Hangul: 북부도서관
- Hanja: 北部圖書館
- RR: Bukbu doseogwan
- MR: Pukpu tosŏgwan

Bukbu Library is municipal library that is located in Buk District. The library opened 24 November 1983. The number of books is total 250,956; that of papers is 31,997.

Gususan Library consists of one basement floor and three floors above the ground. It is a district library with more than 100,000 books and 544 seats.

The district contains the traditional market Chilseong Market.

== See also ==
- Subdivisions of South Korea
- Kyungpook National University Museum
- Daehyeon-dong, Daegu

== Notes ==
1. "History". Buk-gu government website.
