= Busan station =

Train station in Busan, South Korea

부산
Busan
- The main terminal for Busan Station

Korean name
- Hangul: 부산역
- Hanja: 釜山驛
- RR: Busan-yeok
- MR: Pusan-yŏk

General information
- Location: 206 Jungang-daero, Dong District, Busan
- Coordinates: 35.11520°N 129.04137°E
- Operator: Korail
- Lines: Gyeongbu Line; Gyeongbu High Speed Railway
- Platforms: 4
- Tracks: 9

Construction
- Structure type: Aboveground

History
- Opened: 1 April 1908; 118 years ago
Services
Preceding station	Korea Train Express	Following station
Ulsan towards Haengsin, Seoul or Suseo	Gyeongbu KTX	Terminus
Gupo towards Haengsin or Suseo	Gyeongbu KTX via Gupo	Terminus
Preceding station	Korail	Following station
Gupo towards Seoul	ITX-Saemaeul Gyeongbu Line	Terminus
Sasang towards Seoul	ITX-Saemaeul Gyeongbu Line via Sasang	Terminus
Gupo towards Seoul	ITX-Maum Gyeongbu Line	Terminus
Sasang towards Daejeon	ITX-Maum Gyeongbu Line via Sasang	Terminus
Sasang towards Seoul	Mugunghwa-ho Gyeongbu Line	Terminus
Gupo towards Daejeon	Mugunghwa-ho Gyeongbu Line	Terminus
Terminus	S-Train East	Gupo towards Mokpo
Location

Busan Station (Korean: 부산역) is a train station in Busan, South Korea. It is the southern terminus of the Gyeongbu Line and the Gyeongbu high-speed railway, the most important railway lines in the country which links Busan with Seoul. Essentially all trains to Seoul stop in a few settlements between the two cities. It includes an underground station on Busan Metro Line 1, located between Jungang and Choryang stations. The station is located in the center of Choryang-dong (neighborhood) in Dong-gu, Busan.

== Description ==
Main station entrance

Construction of the new KTX Busan terminal began in 2001 and was completed in 2003. The new station covers 24,646 square meters (265,290 square feet) and it is equipped with up-to-date automatic ticket vending machines, 11 elevators, 10 escalators, PC area, waiting and vending areas. Western shop franchises in the station include a Tom&Tom's, a Subway, and a Weeny Beenie.

The convex front of the structure is made of glass and the station is considered an architecturally significant building.

The main entrance opens up to a large park-like area surrounding the front of the station to the west. To the east is the Busan Port International Passenger Terminal, a ferry terminal with service to ports in Japan. The terminal opened in 2015 to replace an earlier facility.

== Platforms ==
Platform No.	Line	Train	Destination	Other
1	Gyeongbu Line	ITX-Saemaeul	For Gupo·Dongdaegu·Daejeon·Seoul	
3·4	Gyeongbu Line	Mugunghwa-ho	For Dongdaegu·Daejeon·Seoul	
5·6	Gyeongbu Line·Gyeongbu High Speed Railway	KTX	For Gupo·Miryang·Dongdaegu·Daejeon·Seoul·Haengsin	
8·9	Gyeongbu Line·Gyeongbu High Speed Railway	KTX	For Ulsan·Gyeongju·Dongdaegu·Daejeon·Seoul·Haengsin	Some KTX Trains run via Suwon or Yeongdeungpo which are stations on the non-KTX Gyeongbu Line
10·13	Gyeongbu Line·Gyeongbu High Speed Railway	KTX·ITX-Saemaeul·Mugunghwa-ho	Exit only	

== Metro station ==
113 부산역 Busan Station
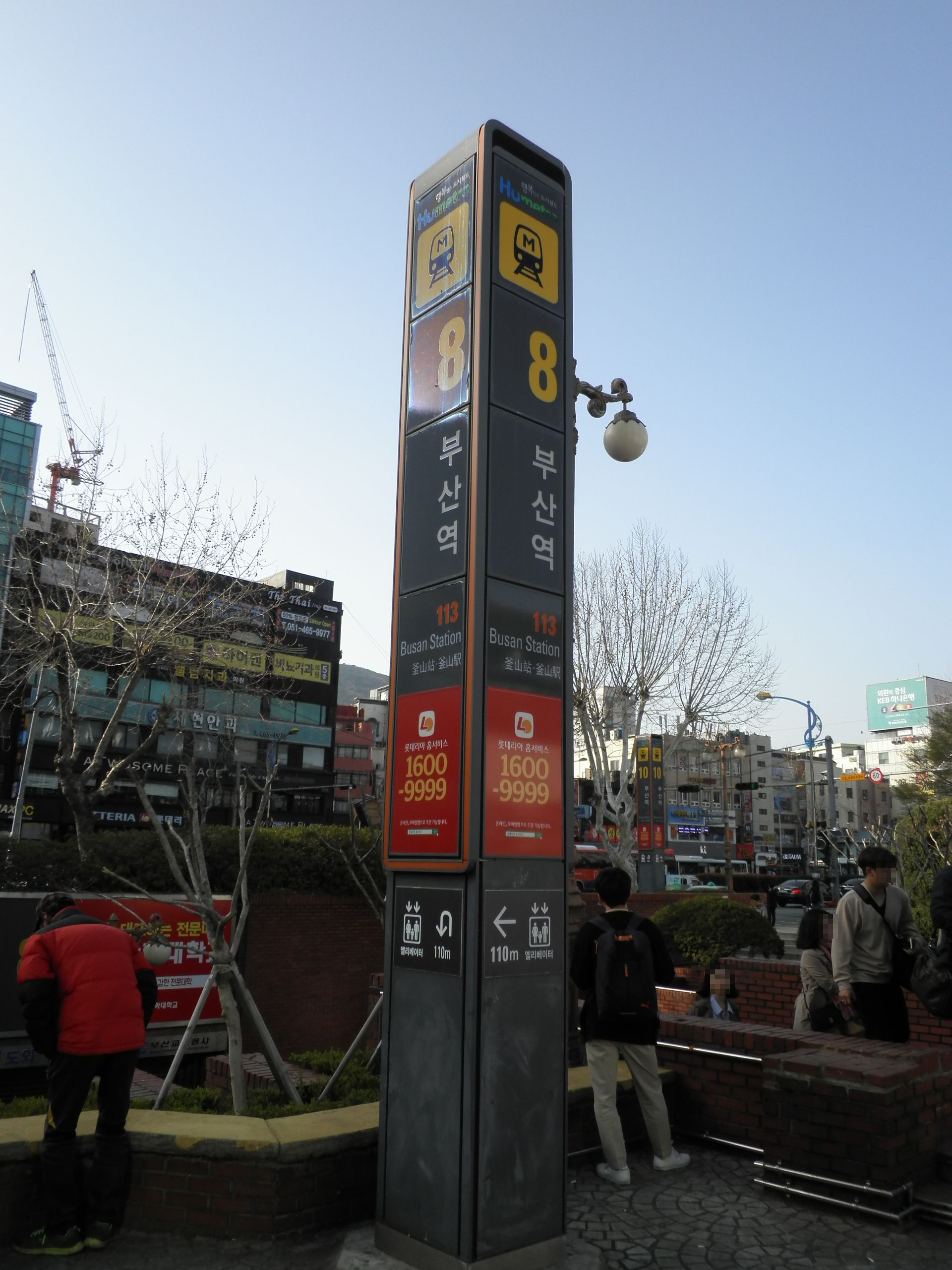
- Exit 8

General information
- Coordinates: 35.115229°N 129.039702°E
- Operator: Busan Transportation Corporation
- Line: Line 1
- Platforms: 2
- Tracks: 2

Construction
- Structure type: Underground

Other information
- Station code: 113

History
- Opened: 15 May 1987; 39 years ago

Services
Preceding station	Busan Metro	Following station
Jungang towards Dadaepo Beach	Line 1	Choryang towards Nopo
Location

Busan Station of the Busan Metro has two side platforms serving two tracks.

=== Platforms ===
Up	●Line 1	For Jungang・Nampo・Dadaepo Beach
Down	●Line 1	For Seomyeon・Yeonsan・Dongnae・Nopo

- Platform numbers are not assigned.

== See also ==
- Transportation in South Korea
