= List of DoReMi Market episodes =

DoReMi Market (Korean: 도레미 마켓), better known as Amazing Saturday (Note: Originally DoReMi Market was named Amazing Saturday. When Prison Life of Fools was announced as the first part of Amazing Saturday, the name "Amazing Saturday" was known as a program with two corner programs. Prison Life of Fools began airing on March 16, 2019 and ended 6 months later.) (놀라운 토요일), is a South Korean television program that airs on tvN. The program airs every Saturday at 19:40 (KST).

== Colour Marking (for Song Dictation only) ==
Success on 1st attempt
Success on 2nd attempt
Success on 3rd attempt
Failed

== Episodes (2018) ==
List of episodes in 2018 (episode 1–39)

Ep.	Air Date	Featured Market	Dressing Theme Concept	Song Questions (Note: Used for the Song Dictation segments) + Snack Time Game (Note: Shown in the following format (starting from episode 5): Song #1 Snack Time Game Song #2)	Guest(s)
1	April 7	Namgwangju Market, Gwangju	Market Stall Owner	BTS - DNA	—N/a
1	April 7	Namgwangju Market, Gwangju	Market Stall Owner	Bolbbalgan4 - Fight Day	—N/a
1	April 7	Namgwangju Market, Gwangju	Market Stall Owner	Seventeen - Very Nice	—N/a
2	April 14	Seomun Market, Daegu	Market Stall Owner	Chakra - Hey U	—N/a
2	April 14	Seomun Market, Daegu	Market Stall Owner	Girls' Generation-TTS - Adrenaline	—N/a
2	April 14	Seomun Market, Daegu	Market Stall Owner	AKMU - Crescendo	—N/a
3	April 21	Hanwoo Market, Hoengseong	Viewing Flowers at Spring	Exo - Lotto	—N/a
3	April 21	Hanwoo Market, Hoengseong	Viewing Flowers at Spring	Sharp - Sweety	—N/a
3	April 21	Hanwoo Market, Hoengseong	Viewing Flowers at Spring	AOA - Heart Attack	—N/a
4	April 28	Jukdo Market, Pohang	Festivals	Twice - Heart Shaker	—N/a
4	April 28	Jukdo Market, Pohang	Festivals	Tashannie - Warning	—N/a
4	April 28	Jukdo Market, Pohang	Festivals	Winner - Really Really	—N/a
5	May 5	Nambu Market, Jeonju	Children's Day	BTS - MIC Drop	—N/a
5	May 5	Nambu Market, Jeonju	Children's Day	New/Old Neologism Quiz	—N/a
5	May 5	Nambu Market, Jeonju	Children's Day	Lee Seung-hwan - Entreaty	—N/a
6	May 12	Dongmun Market, Jeju Island	Jeju Island Vacation Wear	Fin.K.L - Pride	—N/a
6	May 12	Dongmun Market, Jeju Island	Jeju Island Vacation Wear	North Korean Cultural Quiz	—N/a
6	May 12	Dongmun Market, Jeju Island	Jeju Island Vacation Wear	Got7 - Hard Carry	—N/a
7	May 19	Pyeongtaek International Central Market, Pyeongtaek	University Student	Highlight - Plz Don't Be Sad	—N/a
7	May 19	Pyeongtaek International Central Market, Pyeongtaek	University Student	New/Old Neologism Quiz	—N/a
7	May 19	Pyeongtaek International Central Market, Pyeongtaek	University Student	Girls' Generation - Hoot	—N/a
8	May 26	Sinpo International Market, Incheon	Wedding	Lee Jung-hyun - Change	Ji Sang-ryeol
8	May 26	Sinpo International Market, Incheon	Wedding	New/Old OST Quiz (Dramas)	Ji Sang-ryeol
8	May 26	Sinpo International Market, Incheon	Wedding	Super Junior - Devil	Ji Sang-ryeol
9	June 2	Gugyeong Market, Danyang	Baseball Season	MOBB - Hit Me	AOA (Hyejeong, Seolhyun)
9	June 2	Gugyeong Market, Danyang	Baseball Season	What is This Food?	AOA (Hyejeong, Seolhyun)
9	June 2	Gugyeong Market, Danyang	Baseball Season	Cool - This Summer	AOA (Hyejeong, Seolhyun)
10	June 9	Central Market, Wonju	Night Club	2NE1 - I Am the Best	Yang Se-hyung
10	June 9	Central Market, Wonju	Night Club	Voice Support Quiz (Dramas)	Yang Se-hyung
10	June 9	Central Market, Wonju	Night Club	Seventeen - Mansae	Yang Se-hyung
11	June 16	1913 Songjeong Station Market, Gwangju	World Cup	Sechs Kies - Chivalry	Seventeen (Hoshi, DK)
11	June 16	1913 Songjeong Station Market, Gwangju	World Cup	Your Eyes, Nose, Lips Quiz	Seventeen (Hoshi, DK)
11	June 16	1913 Songjeong Station Market, Gwangju	World Cup	Hockee - Would You Pick Me Up	Seventeen (Hoshi, DK)
12	June 23	Old Market, Andong	School Holidays	BigBang - Bae Bae	Heechul (Super Junior), Lee Na-gyung (Fromis 9)
12	June 23	Old Market, Andong	School Holidays	New/Old OST Quiz (Movies)	Heechul (Super Junior), Lee Na-gyung (Fromis 9)
12	June 23	Old Market, Andong	School Holidays	Twice - Like Ooh-Ahh	Heechul (Super Junior), Lee Na-gyung (Fromis 9)
13	June 30	Central Market, Tongyeong	Under The Sea	Shinhwa - Resolver	Kim Jun-hyun, Kim Ji-min
13	June 30	Central Market, Tongyeong	Under The Sea	Voice Support Quiz (Advertisements)	Kim Jun-hyun, Kim Ji-min
13	June 30	Central Market, Tongyeong	Under The Sea	EXID - Hot Pink	Kim Jun-hyun, Kim Ji-min
14	July 7	Specialty Seafood Market, Yeosu	School Look	Red Velvet - Ice Cream Cake	Wanna One (Ong Seong-wu, Lee Dae-hwi)
14	July 7	Specialty Seafood Market, Yeosu	School Look	Voice Support Quiz (Dramas)	Wanna One (Ong Seong-wu, Lee Dae-hwi)
14	July 7	Specialty Seafood Market, Yeosu	School Look	Kim Gun-mo - Theme Game	Wanna One (Ong Seong-wu, Lee Dae-hwi)
15	July 14	Garibong Traditional Market, Seoul	Gayo Top 10	AOA - Cherry Pop	g.o.d (Park Joon-hyung, Danny Ahn)
15	July 14	Garibong Traditional Market, Seoul	Gayo Top 10	New/Old Neologism Quiz	g.o.d (Park Joon-hyung, Danny Ahn)
15	July 14	Garibong Traditional Market, Seoul	Gayo Top 10	Yangpa - Marry Me	g.o.d (Park Joon-hyung, Danny Ahn)
16	July 21	Central Market, Gyeongju	Fashion Trendsetters from Around the World	KARA - Damaged Lady	Tyler Rasch, Han Hyun-min
16	July 21	Central Market, Gyeongju	Fashion Trendsetters from Around the World	Your Eyes, Nose, Lips Quiz	Tyler Rasch, Han Hyun-min
16	July 21	Central Market, Gyeongju	Fashion Trendsetters from Around the World	AKMU - How People Move	Tyler Rasch, Han Hyun-min
17	July 28	Tourist & Fishery Market, Sokcho	Comedian's Make-up Room	Ivy - Sonata of Temptation	Kim Jun-ho, Yoo Min-sang
17	July 28	Tourist & Fishery Market, Sokcho	Comedian's Make-up Room	Consonants Quiz (Korean Movies)	Kim Jun-ho, Yoo Min-sang
17	July 28	Tourist & Fishery Market, Sokcho	Comedian's Make-up Room	Hyukoh - Big Bird	Kim Jun-ho, Yoo Min-sang
18	August 4	Mangwon Market, Seoul	I Love Sports	Bolbbalgan4 - Blue	Twice (Momo, Sana)
18	August 4	Mangwon Market, Seoul	I Love Sports	Your Eyes, Nose Lips Quiz	Twice (Momo, Sana)
18	August 4	Mangwon Market, Seoul	I Love Sports	iKON - Rhythm Ta	Twice (Momo, Sana)
19	August 11	Namhae Traditional Market, Namhae	Cinema Paradiso	Wheesung - Insomnia	Jo Se-ho
19	August 11	Namhae Traditional Market, Namhae	Cinema Paradiso	New/Old OST Quiz (Foreign Movies)	Jo Se-ho
19	August 11	Namhae Traditional Market, Namhae	Cinema Paradiso	Rain - La Song	Jo Se-ho
20	August 18	Eastern Traditional Market, Seosan	Wannabe Star	Blackpink - Ddu-Du Ddu-Du	Hwang Chi-yeul
20	August 18	Eastern Traditional Market, Seosan	Wannabe Star	Voice Support Quiz (Variety Shows)	Hwang Chi-yeul
20	August 18	Eastern Traditional Market, Seosan	Wannabe Star	Skull - One Day	Hwang Chi-yeul
21	August 25	Uiryeong Traditional Market, Uiryeong	Mr. Sunshine	Block B - HER	Blackpink (Jisoo, Rosé)
21	August 25	Uiryeong Traditional Market, Uiryeong	Mr. Sunshine	Love Love Couple Quiz	Blackpink (Jisoo, Rosé)
21	August 25	Uiryeong Traditional Market, Uiryeong	Mr. Sunshine	Autumn Vacation - Between Yellow and Red	Blackpink (Jisoo, Rosé)
22	September 1	Central Market, Jinju	Fantasy Couple	Bobby (iKON) - YGGR#HIPHOP	Koyote (Kim Jong-min, Shin Ji)
22	September 1	Central Market, Jinju	Fantasy Couple	New/Old Neologism Quiz	Koyote (Kim Jong-min, Shin Ji)
22	September 1	Central Market, Jinju	Fantasy Couple	Brown Eyed Girls - Sixth Sense	Koyote (Kim Jong-min, Shin Ji)
23	September 8	Central Market, Mokpo	Airport Fashion	Seo Taiji and Boys - Pilseung	Super Junior-D&E
23	September 8	Central Market, Mokpo	Airport Fashion	Your Eyes, Nose Lips Quiz	Super Junior-D&E
23	September 8	Central Market, Mokpo	Airport Fashion	Jay Park - Girl Friend	Super Junior-D&E
24	September 15	Central Market, Seoul	Autumn Excursion	Mamamoo - Yes I Am	Oh My Girl (YooA, Seunghee)
24	September 15	Central Market, Seoul	Autumn Excursion	Find The Fanclub Owner	Oh My Girl (YooA, Seunghee)
24	September 15	Central Market, Seoul	Autumn Excursion	D.Bace - Everything to You	Oh My Girl (YooA, Seunghee)
25	September 22	Pastor City Market, Naju	Amazing Chuseok	Busker Busker - It's Hard to Face You	iKON (Bobby, Donghyuk)
25	September 22	Pastor City Market, Naju	Amazing Chuseok	New/Old BGM Quiz (Games)	iKON (Bobby, Donghyuk)
25	September 22	Pastor City Market, Naju	Amazing Chuseok	Yang Hyun-suk - Smoke of The Devil	iKON (Bobby, Donghyuk)
26	September 29	Moraenae Market, Incheon	Reminisce About C'est si bon	AKMU - Reality	Yang Hee-eun, Ji Sang-ryeol
26	September 29	Moraenae Market, Incheon	Reminisce About C'est si bon	New/Old BGM Quiz (Variety Shows)	Yang Hee-eun, Ji Sang-ryeol
26	September 29	Moraenae Market, Incheon	Reminisce About C'est si bon	Boom - Shout	Yang Hee-eun, Ji Sang-ryeol
27	October 6	Nammun Market, Suwon	Along with the Gods	Lee Hyun-do - Sajahoo	Got7 (Mark, JB)
27	October 6	Nammun Market, Suwon	Along with the Gods	Love Love Couple Quiz	Got7 (Mark, JB)
27	October 6	Nammun Market, Suwon	Along with the Gods	Dean - Instagram	Got7 (Mark, JB)
28	October 13	Bongpyeong Traditional Market, Pyeongchang	Show Me the AS (Note: AS is Amazing Saturday in short)	BTS - Fake Love	Girl's Day (Sojin, Yura)
28	October 13	Bongpyeong Traditional Market, Pyeongchang	Show Me the AS	Voice Support Quiz (Comedy Famous Lines)	Girl's Day (Sojin, Yura)
28	October 13	Bongpyeong Traditional Market, Pyeongchang	Show Me the AS	Wheesung - Love is Delicious	Girl's Day (Sojin, Yura)
29	October 20	Jeil Market, Uijeongbu	Look of a Fan's Heart	Noise - You In My Imagination	Park Ji-sun, Minho (Shinee)
29	October 20	Jeil Market, Uijeongbu	Look of a Fan's Heart	Translator Quiz (Korean Movies; English Accent)	Park Ji-sun, Minho (Shinee)
29	October 20	Jeil Market, Uijeongbu	Look of a Fan's Heart	Zico (Block B) (feat. Crush, Dean) - Bermuda Triangle	Park Ji-sun, Minho (Shinee)
30	October 27	Yeokjeon Market, Cheonan	Amazing Halloween	UP - Sea	Heo Kyung-hwan, Hwang Je-sung
30	October 27	Yeokjeon Market, Cheonan	Amazing Halloween	Dictionary Battle	Heo Kyung-hwan, Hwang Je-sung
30	October 27	Yeokjeon Market, Cheonan	Amazing Halloween	G-Dragon (BigBang) - Crayon	Heo Kyung-hwan, Hwang Je-sung
31	November 3	Yangyang Traditional Market, Yangyang	Amazing Aesop's Fables	Bada - Mad	Jang Dong-min, Parc Jae-jung
31	November 3	Yangyang Traditional Market, Yangyang	Amazing Aesop's Fables	Translator Quiz (Dramas; Japanese and Chinese Accents)	Jang Dong-min, Parc Jae-jung
31	November 3	Yangyang Traditional Market, Yangyang	Amazing Aesop's Fables	Dynamic Duo - Fireworks	Jang Dong-min, Parc Jae-jung
32	November 10	Bupyeong Kkangtong Market, Busan	Amazing People on the Island	Seventeen - Pretty U	Kim Ji-seok, Jeon So-min
32	November 10	Bupyeong Kkangtong Market, Busan	Amazing People on the Island	Dictionary Battle	Kim Ji-seok, Jeon So-min
32	November 10	Bupyeong Kkangtong Market, Busan	Amazing People on the Island	Buzz - Tree	Kim Ji-seok, Jeon So-min
33	November 17	Gwangjang Market, Seoul	Autumn Man Autumn Woman	Space A - Maturity	Block B (Jaehyo, P.O)
33	November 17	Gwangjang Market, Seoul	Autumn Man Autumn Woman	New/Old OST Quiz (Animations)	Block B (Jaehyo, P.O)
33	November 17	Gwangjang Market, Seoul	Autumn Man Autumn Woman	Humming Urban Stereo - Stalker	Block B (Jaehyo, P.O)
34	November 24	Western Market, Taean	Wannabe Musical Star	Baby V.O.X - Ya Ya Ya	K.Will, Soyou
34	November 24	Western Market, Taean	Wannabe Musical Star	Translator Quiz (Korean Music; Japanese Accent)	K.Will, Soyou
34	November 24	Western Market, Taean	Wannabe Musical Star	Crush (feat. Zico (Block B)) - Cereal	K.Will, Soyou
35	December 1	Central New Market, Andong	AS Tradings Annual Meeting	EXO - Overdose	EXID (Solji, Hani)
35	December 1	Central New Market, Andong	AS Tradings Annual Meeting	Your Eyes, Nose, Lips Quiz	EXID (Solji, Hani)
35	December 1	Central New Market, Andong	AS Tradings Annual Meeting	Rainbow - A	EXID (Solji, Hani)
36	December 8	Myeongdong Street, Chuncheon	Amazing Sleepover	Turbo - My Childhood Dream	Red Velvet (Wendy, Joy), Park Ji-sun (Note: Standing in for Hyeri)
36	December 8	Myeongdong Street, Chuncheon	Amazing Sleepover	North Korean Cultural Quiz	Red Velvet (Wendy, Joy), Park Ji-sun
36	December 8	Myeongdong Street, Chuncheon	Amazing Sleepover	Orange Caramel - Bangkok City	Red Velvet (Wendy, Joy), Park Ji-sun
37	December 15	Central Food Market, Mokpo	My Rookie Days	Celeb Five - Shutter	Iz*One (Kwon Eun-bi, An Yu-jin)
37	December 15	Central Food Market, Mokpo	My Rookie Days	Consonants Quiz (Snack Brands)	Iz*One (Kwon Eun-bi, An Yu-jin)
37	December 15	Central Food Market, Mokpo	My Rookie Days	Park Hyo-shin - Good Person	Iz*One (Kwon Eun-bi, An Yu-jin)
38	December 22	Gangneung Traditional Market, Gangneung	Amazing Christmas	Young Turks Club - Ugly Complex	Hyoyeon (Girls' Generation), Doyoung (NCT)
38	December 22	Gangneung Traditional Market, Gangneung	Amazing Christmas	New/Old OST Quiz (Dramas)	Hyoyeon (Girls' Generation), Doyoung (NCT)
38	December 22	Gangneung Traditional Market, Gangneung	Amazing Christmas	Wanna One - Flowerbomb	Hyoyeon (Girls' Generation), Doyoung (NCT)
39	December 29	Gwangmyeong Traditional Market, Gwangmyeong	2018 DoReMi Entertainment Awards	Sechs Kies - Road Fighter	Winner (Song Min-ho, Kang Seung-yoon)
39	December 29	Gwangmyeong Traditional Market, Gwangmyeong	2018 DoReMi Entertainment Awards	New / Old Neologism Quiz	Winner (Song Min-ho, Kang Seung-yoon)
39	December 29	Gwangmyeong Traditional Market, Gwangmyeong	2018 DoReMi Entertainment Awards	K/DA - Pop/Stars	Winner (Song Min-ho, Kang Seung-yoon)

== Episodes (2019) ==
List of episodes in 2019 (episode 40-89)

Ep.	Air Date	Featured Market	Dressing Theme Concept	Song Questions + Snack Time Game	Guest(s)
40	January 5	Hongseong Traditional Market, Hongseong	Muddling Palace Grand Feast	BTS - Dope	Lee Se-young, Yeo Jin-goo
40	January 5	Hongseong Traditional Market, Hongseong	Muddling Palace Grand Feast	Voice Support Quiz (Dramas)	Lee Se-young, Yeo Jin-goo
40	January 5	Hongseong Traditional Market, Hongseong	Muddling Palace Grand Feast	Kim Johan - Love Prepared For You	Lee Se-young, Yeo Jin-goo
41	January 12	Gochang Traditional Market, Gochang	Cosmic Turmoil Attack with Speed and Velocity	Kan Mi-youn (feat. Eric) - Paparazzi	WJSN (Luda, Dayoung)
41	January 12	Gochang Traditional Market, Gochang	Cosmic Turmoil Attack with Speed and Velocity	Lyrics Reading Quiz	WJSN (Luda, Dayoung)
41	January 12	Gochang Traditional Market, Gochang	Cosmic Turmoil Attack with Speed and Velocity	Epik High (feat. Younha) - Umbrella	WJSN (Luda, Dayoung)
42	January 19	Namdaemun Market, Seoul	I Want to be a Super Insider	SHINee - Ring Ding Dong	Park Sung-kwang, Jong Tae-se
42	January 19	Namdaemun Market, Seoul	I Want to be a Super Insider	Love Love Couple Quiz	Park Sung-kwang, Jong Tae-se
42	January 19	Namdaemun Market, Seoul	I Want to be a Super Insider	IU - Bbibbi	Park Sung-kwang, Jong Tae-se
43	January 26	Central Market, Yongin	Golden Pig and the Zodiac (a.k.a A Mess)	G-Dragon (BigBang) - MichiGO	Nam Chang-hee, Hwang Kwang-hee (ZE:A)
43	January 26	Central Market, Yongin	Golden Pig and the Zodiac (a.k.a A Mess)	New/Old BGM Quiz (Television Programs)	Nam Chang-hee, Hwang Kwang-hee (ZE:A)
43	January 26	Central Market, Yongin	Golden Pig and the Zodiac (a.k.a A Mess)	Shin Shin-ae - Crazy World	Nam Chang-hee, Hwang Kwang-hee (ZE:A)
44	February 2	Bangsan Market, Seoul	Yesterday's Magpie Seollal, Today's Our Seollal	Eagle Five - Squid Alien	Lee Hong-gi (F.T. Island), Chanmi (AOA)
44	February 2	Bangsan Market, Seoul	Yesterday's Magpie Seollal, Today's Our Seollal	Doppelganger Quiz	Lee Hong-gi (F.T. Island), Chanmi (AOA)
44	February 2	Bangsan Market, Seoul	Yesterday's Magpie Seollal, Today's Our Seollal	Mamamoo - Egotistic	Lee Hong-gi (F.T. Island), Chanmi (AOA)
45	February 9	Central Market, Anyang	DoReMi Big League	Pipi Band - How to Chew Chewy Gum	Lee Yong-jin, Yang Se-chan
45	February 9	Central Market, Anyang	DoReMi Big League	Dialect Tour	Lee Yong-jin, Yang Se-chan
45	February 9	Central Market, Anyang	DoReMi Big League	Zico (Block B) (feat. IU) - SoulMate	Lee Yong-jin, Yang Se-chan
46	February 16	Seomun Market, Daegu	Valentine's Day	Lee Jung-hyun - Give To You	Wheesung, Taemin (SHINee)
46	February 16	Seomun Market, Daegu	Valentine's Day	Lyrics Reading Quiz	Wheesung, Taemin (SHINee)
46	February 16	Seomun Market, Daegu	Valentine's Day	Hockey - Dreaming Boy	Wheesung, Taemin (SHINee)
47	February 23	Hwaji Central Market, Nonsan	End of the Holidays!! School Reopens!!	Untitle - Wings	SF9 (Rowoon, Chani)
47	February 23	Hwaji Central Market, Nonsan	End of the Holidays!! School Reopens!!	Consonants Quiz (Ice Cream Brands)	SF9 (Rowoon, Chani)
47	February 23	Hwaji Central Market, Nonsan	End of the Holidays!! School Reopens!!	Dal Shabet - Supa Dupa Diva	SF9 (Rowoon, Chani)
48	March 2	Bukbu Market, Iksan	Pit-a-pat Dating Day	Novasonic - Another Truth (Note: The full song title is "The Last Letter... Even That is a Lie: Another Truth".)	Kang Min-kyung (Davichi), Yoon Ji-sung
48	March 2	Bukbu Market, Iksan	Pit-a-pat Dating Day	Doppelganger Quiz	Kang Min-kyung (Davichi), Yoon Ji-sung
48	March 2	Bukbu Market, Iksan	Pit-a-pat Dating Day	AKMU - Dinosaur	Kang Min-kyung (Davichi), Yoon Ji-sung
49	March 9	Gongdeok Market, Seoul	Fantasised Combinations	Twice - Touchdown	Got7 (JB, Yugyeom) (Note: Promoting as a sub-unit of the group, Jus2.)
49	March 9	Gongdeok Market, Seoul	Fantasised Combinations	Translator Quiz (Dramas; Japanese and English Accents)	Got7 (JB, Yugyeom)
49	March 9	Gongdeok Market, Seoul	Fantasised Combinations	Bros - Win Win	Got7 (JB, Yugyeom)
50	March 16	Moolmakeun Market, Yangpyeong	If I Were to Describe Myself	Infinite - Be Mine	Mamamoo (Solar, Hwasa)
50	March 16	Moolmakeun Market, Yangpyeong	If I Were to Describe Myself	I Can See Your Title (Movies)	Mamamoo (Solar, Hwasa)
50	March 16	Moolmakeun Market, Yangpyeong	If I Were to Describe Myself	Suran - A Pleasant Meal	Mamamoo (Solar, Hwasa)
51	March 23	Central Market, Hongcheon	The God of Events	Jinusean - A Yo!	Hong Jin-young, Jin Hae-sung
51	March 23	Central Market, Hongcheon	The God of Events	Dictionary Battle	Hong Jin-young, Jin Hae-sung
51	March 23	Central Market, Hongcheon	The God of Events	Lee Seung-hwan - At The Hair Salon	Hong Jin-young, Jin Hae-sung
52	March 30	Hangul Market, Yeoju	Blushing 8th Grade Disease	Apink - I'm So Sick	Bolbbalgan4
52	March 30	Hangul Market, Yeoju	Blushing 8th Grade Disease	Consonants Quiz (Ramyeon Brands)	Bolbbalgan4
52	March 30	Hangul Market, Yeoju	Blushing 8th Grade Disease	Kim Boo-yong - Poverty Inside The Wealthy	Bolbbalgan4
53	April 6	Sinwon Market, Seoul	Amazing 1st Birthday Party	EXO - Mama	Block B (B-Bomb, U-Kwon)
53	April 6	Sinwon Market, Seoul	Amazing 1st Birthday Party	New/Old Neologism Quiz	Block B (B-Bomb, U-Kwon)
53	April 6	Sinwon Market, Seoul	Amazing 1st Birthday Party	Yoon Jong-shin - Empty City	Block B (B-Bomb, U-Kwon)
54	April 13	Hwagae Market, Hadong	Welcome to Honeymoon	Hyun Young - Nuna's Dream	Lee Yong-jin, Lee Jin-ho, Chen (EXO) (Note: Standing in for P.O)
54	April 13	Hwagae Market, Hadong	Welcome to Honeymoon	Lyrics Reading Quiz	Lee Yong-jin, Lee Jin-ho, Chen (EXO)
54	April 13	Hwagae Market, Hadong	Welcome to Honeymoon	Jang Beom-june - To Ilsan	Lee Yong-jin, Lee Jin-ho, Chen (EXO)
55	April 20	Central Maeil Seodong Market, Iksan	ZALAZALAZA~ Black Day	Girls' Generation - Lion Heart	Ravi (VIXX), Sejeong (Gugudan)
55	April 20	Central Maeil Seodong Market, Iksan	ZALAZALAZA~ Black Day	Voice Support Quiz (Variety Shows)	Ravi (VIXX), Sejeong (Gugudan)
55	April 20	Central Maeil Seodong Market, Iksan	ZALAZALAZA~ Black Day	Toy - Complex	Ravi (VIXX), Sejeong (Gugudan)
56	April 27	Osaek/Five Colours Market, Osan	AS Police Department	R.ef - Brilliant Love (Heartbreak II)	Ra Mi-ran, Lee Sung-kyung
56	April 27	Osaek/Five Colours Market, Osan	AS Police Department	New/Old OST Quiz (Foreign Dramas)	Ra Mi-ran, Lee Sung-kyung
56	April 27	Osaek/Five Colours Market, Osan	AS Police Department	Key (SHINee) (feat. Soyeon ((G)I-dle)) - I Wanna Be	Ra Mi-ran, Lee Sung-kyung
57	May 4	Fish Market, Masan	We Got Reborn	Lee So-ra + Park Hyo-shin - It's Gonna Be Rolling	Park Bo-young, Ahn Hyo-seop
57	May 4	Fish Market, Masan	We Got Reborn	Your Eyes, Nose, Lips Quiz (Actors/Actresses)	Park Bo-young, Ahn Hyo-seop
57	May 4	Fish Market, Masan	We Got Reborn	Hanhae (feat. Dope'Doug) - Clip Clop	Park Bo-young, Ahn Hyo-seop
58	May 11	Yeokgok Sangsang Market, Bucheon	DoReMi Family Contest - Who Looks Like Who?	Goofy - Tragic Love	NU'EST (JR, Minhyun)
58	May 11	Yeokgok Sangsang Market, Bucheon	DoReMi Family Contest - Who Looks Like Who?	Consonants Quiz (Drinks Brands)	NU'EST (JR, Minhyun)
58	May 11	Yeokgok Sangsang Market, Bucheon	DoReMi Family Contest - Who Looks Like Who?	BTS (feat. Halsey) - Boy with Luv	NU'EST (JR, Minhyun)
59	May 18	Heukseok Market, Seoul	AS Newsroom	Jannabi - Summer	Ahn Hyun-mo, Shin A-young
59	May 18	Heukseok Market, Seoul	AS Newsroom	Doppelganger Quiz	Ahn Hyun-mo, Shin A-young
59	May 18	Heukseok Market, Seoul	AS Newsroom	Seventeen - Oh My!	Ahn Hyun-mo, Shin A-young
60	May 25	Central Market, Boryeong	Dance God Dance King	Clon - Come To Me	AB6IX (Park Woo-jin, Lee Dae-hwi), Park Ji-sun
60	May 25	Central Market, Boryeong	Dance God Dance King	New/Old OST Quiz (Animations)	AB6IX (Park Woo-jin, Lee Dae-hwi), Park Ji-sun
60	May 25	Central Market, Boryeong	Dance God Dance King	Hockee - Strawberry Shampoo	AB6IX (Park Woo-jin, Lee Dae-hwi), Park Ji-sun
61	June 1	Bangi Market, Seoul	Fashion Terrorist	Twice - Fancy	Song Kyung-ah, Song Hae-na, Lee Jin-ho
61	June 1	Bangi Market, Seoul	Fashion Terrorist	Find The Original Singer	Song Kyung-ah, Song Hae-na, Lee Jin-ho
61	June 1	Bangi Market, Seoul	Fashion Terrorist	VIXX - Love Equation	Song Kyung-ah, Song Hae-na, Lee Jin-ho
62	June 8	Tongin Market, Seoul	AS School Lunch King	Apink - %% (Eung Eung)	Eun Ji-won (Sechs Kies), Lee Na-eun (April)
62	June 8	Tongin Market, Seoul	AS School Lunch King	Lyrics Reading Quiz	Eun Ji-won (Sechs Kies), Lee Na-eun (April)
62	June 8	Tongin Market, Seoul	AS School Lunch King	So Ji-sub - So Ganzi	Eun Ji-won (Sechs Kies), Lee Na-eun (April)
63	June 15	Ganghwa Pungmul Market, Incheon	Produce X DoReMi	Sechs Kies - Escape	Shownu (Monsta X), Luda (WJSN)
63	June 15	Ganghwa Pungmul Market, Incheon	Produce X DoReMi	Love Love Couple Quiz	Shownu (Monsta X), Luda (WJSN)
63	June 15	Ganghwa Pungmul Market, Incheon	Produce X DoReMi	Girls' Generation - All Night	Shownu (Monsta X), Luda (WJSN)
64	June 22	Jagalchi Market, Busan	AS Travel Agency	TVXQ - Keep Your Head Down	Han Hye-jin, Kyuhyun (Super Junior)
64	June 22	Jagalchi Market, Busan	AS Travel Agency	Face/Off	Han Hye-jin, Kyuhyun (Super Junior)
64	June 22	Jagalchi Market, Busan	AS Travel Agency	Bolbbalgan4 - #First Love	Han Hye-jin, Kyuhyun (Super Junior)
65	June 29	Ilsan Market, Goyang	Land Land What Land?	Brown Eyed Girls - How Come	Momoland (JooE, Nancy)
65	June 29	Ilsan Market, Goyang	Land Land What Land?	Consonants Quiz (Korean Fried Chicken Brands)	Momoland (JooE, Nancy)
65	June 29	Ilsan Market, Goyang	Land Land What Land?	Heize (feat. Dean, DJ Friz) - And July	Momoland (JooE, Nancy)
66	July 6	East Sea Central Market, Donghae	1999 Dream Concert	BTS - Boy In Luv	Jang Su-won (Sechs Kies), Ayumi
66	July 6	East Sea Central Market, Donghae	1999 Dream Concert	New/Old Neologism Quiz	Jang Su-won (Sechs Kies), Ayumi
66	July 6	East Sea Central Market, Donghae	1999 Dream Concert	Hyun Young - Love Revolution	Jang Su-won (Sechs Kies), Ayumi
67	July 13	Gunsan Public Market, Gunsan	Dog Days of DoReMi	f(x) - Hot Summer	Defconn, Lee Sung-jong (Infinite)
67	July 13	Gunsan Public Market, Gunsan	Dog Days of DoReMi	Dialect Tour	Defconn, Lee Sung-jong (Infinite)
67	July 13	Gunsan Public Market, Gunsan	Dog Days of DoReMi	Yang Dong-geun - Alley	Defconn, Lee Sung-jong (Infinite)
68	July 20	Euneujeongi Culture Street, Daejeon	My Life Character	T-ara - I Go Crazy Because Of You	Yoo Se-yoon, Ahn Young-mi
68	July 20	Euneujeongi Culture Street, Daejeon	My Life Character	Consonants Quiz (Movies)	Yoo Se-yoon, Ahn Young-mi
68	July 20	Euneujeongi Culture Street, Daejeon	My Life Character	SHINee - Amigo	Yoo Se-yoon, Ahn Young-mi
69	July 27	Namseong Sagye Market, Seoul	When the Devil Calls Your Name	Girl - Aspirin	Park Sung-woong, Jung Kyung-ho
69	July 27	Namseong Sagye Market, Seoul	When the Devil Calls Your Name	Doppelganger Quiz	Park Sung-woong, Jung Kyung-ho
69	July 27	Namseong Sagye Market, Seoul	When the Devil Calls Your Name	Yoo Se-yoon - Pyongyang Naengmyeon (with Jung Sang-hoon)	Park Sung-woong, Jung Kyung-ho
70	August 3	Bupyeong Market, Incheon	Romanticists of the 17th Century	Red Velvet - Zimzalabim	Choi Jae-woong, Lee Kyu-hyung
70	August 3	Bupyeong Market, Incheon	Romanticists of the 17th Century	New/Old OST Quiz (Dramas)	Choi Jae-woong, Lee Kyu-hyung
70	August 3	Bupyeong Market, Incheon	Romanticists of the 17th Century	Bijou - Love You More Than Anyone	Choi Jae-woong, Lee Kyu-hyung
71	August 10	Sanseong Market, Gongju	My Girls' Generation	AKMU - 200%	Girls' Generation (Taeyeon, Sunny)
71	August 10	Sanseong Market, Gongju	My Girls' Generation	Lyrics Reading Quiz	Girls' Generation (Taeyeon, Sunny)
71	August 10	Sanseong Market, Gongju	My Girls' Generation	The Grace - Dancer In The Rain	Girls' Generation (Taeyeon, Sunny)
72	August 17	Gumi Saemaul Central Market, Gumi	DoReMi Guest House	Diva - Yes	Lee Hyun-yi, Jang Do-yeon, Ravi (VIXX) (Note: Standing in for Nucksal)
72	August 17	Gumi Saemaul Central Market, Gumi	DoReMi Guest House	Love Love Couple Quiz	Lee Hyun-yi, Jang Do-yeon, Ravi (VIXX)
72	August 17	Gumi Saemaul Central Market, Gumi	DoReMi Guest House	Nucksal + Jo Woo-chan (feat. Don Mills) - What You Call is The Price	Lee Hyun-yi, Jang Do-yeon, Ravi (VIXX)
73	August 24	Ttukdo Market, Seoul	Sky Blue Balloon	EXO - Tempo	g.o.d (Son Ho-young, Kim Tae-woo) (Note: Promoting as duo HoooW.)
73	August 24	Ttukdo Market, Seoul	Sky Blue Balloon	Find The Original Singer	g.o.d (Son Ho-young, Kim Tae-woo)
73	August 24	Ttukdo Market, Seoul	Sky Blue Balloon	Papaya - Making Love	g.o.d (Son Ho-young, Kim Tae-woo)
74	August 31	Yukgeori Traditional Market, Cheongju	Dress Code: Pink	IZ*ONE - O' My!	Apink (Yoon Bo-mi, Oh Ha-young)
74	August 31	Yukgeori Traditional Market, Cheongju	Dress Code: Pink	Doppelganger Quiz (Singers)	Apink (Yoon Bo-mi, Oh Ha-young)
74	August 31	Yukgeori Traditional Market, Cheongju	Dress Code: Pink	Kim Hyun-jung - Truth and Techniques	Apink (Yoon Bo-mi, Oh Ha-young)
75	September 7	Sangnam Market, Changwon	DoReMi Mart	IU - Jam Jam	Kim Byung-chul, Jung Hye-sung
75	September 7	Sangnam Market, Changwon	DoReMi Mart	Consonants Quiz (Hamburger Brands)	Kim Byung-chul, Jung Hye-sung
75	September 7	Sangnam Market, Changwon	DoReMi Mart	Kim Jong-seo - Plastic Syndrome	Kim Byung-chul, Jung Hye-sung
Special 1	September 14	Chuseok Special: Snack Time Compilation Special (After All The Winner Will Still Be Kim Dong-hyun)			—N/a
76	September 21	Sinheung Market, Seoul	This is Lovely	Bolbbalgan4 - To My Youth	Lovelyz (Mijoo, Kei)
76	September 21	Sinheung Market, Seoul	This is Lovely	Dialect Tour	Lovelyz (Mijoo, Kei)
76	September 21	Sinheung Market, Seoul	This is Lovely	T.T.Ma - Prism	Lovelyz (Mijoo, Kei)
77	September 28	Chunhyanggol Public Market, Namwon	Shining Shining Bling Bling	BTS - Fire	Twice (Nayeon, Jihyo, Chaeyoung)
77	September 28	Chunhyanggol Public Market, Namwon	Shining Shining Bling Bling	Lyrics Reading Quiz	Twice (Nayeon, Jihyo, Chaeyoung)
77	September 28	Chunhyanggol Public Market, Namwon	Shining Shining Bling Bling	Ivy - A-Ha	Twice (Nayeon, Jihyo, Chaeyoung)
78 (Note: Special appearance by Megan Fox as a special correspondent via VCR.)	October 5	Munsan Market, Paju	Koreans in the World - Global Korea	Hyuna (feat. Jung Il-hoon (BtoB)) - Roll Deep	Baek Ji-young, Sandeul (B1A4)
78	October 5	Munsan Market, Paju	Koreans in the World - Global Korea	Find The Hidden Real Name	Baek Ji-young, Sandeul (B1A4)
78	October 5	Munsan Market, Paju	Koreans in the World - Global Korea	EXO-CBX - Lazy	Baek Ji-young, Sandeul (B1A4)
79	October 12	Tongbok Market, Pyeongtaek	Autumn Sports Festival	Gray - TMI	X1 (Kim Woo-seok, Son Dong-pyo)
79	October 12	Tongbok Market, Pyeongtaek	Autumn Sports Festival	I Can See Your Title (Movies)	X1 (Kim Woo-seok, Son Dong-pyo)
79	October 12	Tongbok Market, Pyeongtaek	Autumn Sports Festival	Orange Caramel - Shanghai Romance	X1 (Kim Woo-seok, Son Dong-pyo)
80	October 19	Hwasun Dolmen Traditional Market, Hwasun	Aspects of Subway Station	Fin.K.L - Shadow	Kim Seon-ho, Moon Geun-young
80	October 19	Hwasun Dolmen Traditional Market, Hwasun	Aspects of Subway Station	Voice Support Quiz (Dramas)	Kim Seon-ho, Moon Geun-young
80	October 19	Hwasun Dolmen Traditional Market, Hwasun	Aspects of Subway Station	Ravi (VIXX) - Tuxedo	Kim Seon-ho, Moon Geun-young
81	October 26	Inhyeon Market, Seoul	Soldiers of the Century	Rain - Hip Song	Lee Hong-gi (F.T. Island), Yuju (Cherry Bullet)
81	October 26	Inhyeon Market, Seoul	Soldiers of the Century	New/Old BGM Quiz (Television Programs)	Lee Hong-gi (F.T. Island), Yuju (Cherry Bullet)
81	October 26	Inhyeon Market, Seoul	Soldiers of the Century	Park Ji-yoon - Broken	Lee Hong-gi (F.T. Island), Yuju (Cherry Bullet)
82	November 2	Buan Permanent Market, Buan	Monster Family	Bewhy (feat. Jay Park) - Day Day	Monsta X (Shownu, Joohoney)
82	November 2	Buan Permanent Market, Buan	Monster Family	Noraebang Accompaniment Quiz (Trot Songs)	Monsta X (Shownu, Joohoney)
82	November 2	Buan Permanent Market, Buan	Monster Family	So Chan-whee - Hold Me Now	Monsta X (Shownu, Joohoney)
Special 2	November 9	Highlights Special Episode: Reply 90's (Note: Originally the episode with guests IZ*ONE (Choi Ye-na, Jang Won-young) would be aired. However, due to the Mnet vote manipulation investigation, the episode would not be aired and instead a highlights special episode would be aired. This episode is then confirmed to be aired on February 26, 2020 at 23:00 (KST), as an unaired special.)			—N/a
83	November 16	Sorae Pogu Traditional Fish Market, Incheon	CSAT Fashion	Giriboy (feat. Heize) - Traffic Control	Yoon Shi-yoon, Jung In-sun
83	November 16	Sorae Pogu Traditional Fish Market, Incheon	CSAT Fashion	Doppelganger Quiz (Actors/Actresses)	Yoon Shi-yoon, Jung In-sun
83	November 16	Sorae Pogu Traditional Fish Market, Incheon	CSAT Fashion	Lee Hye-young - La Dolce Vita	Yoon Shi-yoon, Jung In-sun
84	November 23	Songhwa Mural Market, Seoul	DoReMi in Black	One Two - Now, Hips	Brown Eyed Girls (Miryo, Narsha)
84	November 23	Songhwa Mural Market, Seoul	DoReMi in Black	Find The Original Singer	Brown Eyed Girls (Miryo, Narsha)
84	November 23	Songhwa Mural Market, Seoul	DoReMi in Black	WJSN - Boogie Up	Brown Eyed Girls (Miryo, Narsha)
85	November 30	Yeongju 365 Market, Yeongju	Chorus of the Angels (Carrusel)	Kim Hyun-jung - Lonely Love	AOA (Jimin, Seolhyun)
85	November 30	Yeongju 365 Market, Yeongju	Chorus of the Angels (Carrusel)	Noraebang Accompaniment Quiz (2049 Noraebang Top Songs)	AOA (Jimin, Seolhyun)
85	November 30	Yeongju 365 Market, Yeongju	Chorus of the Angels (Carrusel)	(G)I-dle - Uh-Oh	AOA (Jimin, Seolhyun)
86	December 7	Central Traditional Market, Tongyeong	Couple Up Duo	Hyeon In - Silla's Moon Night	Davichi
86	December 7	Central Traditional Market, Tongyeong	Couple Up Duo	Character Expression Quiz	Davichi
86	December 7	Central Traditional Market, Tongyeong	Couple Up Duo	Lee Hyo-ri - Depth	Davichi
87	December 14	Yeongdong Traditional Market, Seoul	Taste of Husband	Baby V.O.X - Get Up	Rhymer, Ahn Hyun-mo
87	December 14	Yeongdong Traditional Market, Seoul	Taste of Husband	Consonants Quiz (Ramyeon Brands)	Rhymer, Ahn Hyun-mo
87	December 14	Yeongdong Traditional Market, Seoul	Taste of Husband	EXO - Gravity	Rhymer, Ahn Hyun-mo
88	December 21	Guri Traditional Market, Guri	Merry Christmas	Twice - Likey	Lee Si-eon, Simon Dominic
88	December 21	Guri Traditional Market, Guri	Merry Christmas	Dialect Tour	Lee Si-eon, Simon Dominic
88	December 21	Guri Traditional Market, Guri	Merry Christmas	Ailee - Mind Your Own Business	Lee Si-eon, Simon Dominic
89	December 28	Noryangjin Fish Market, Seoul	The 2nd DoReMi Entertainment Awards	IU - Blueming	Hong Seok-cheon, Rosé (Blackpink)
89	December 28	Noryangjin Fish Market, Seoul	The 2nd DoReMi Entertainment Awards	Choreography Décalcomanie Quiz	Hong Seok-cheon, Rosé (Blackpink)
89	December 28	Noryangjin Fish Market, Seoul	The 2nd DoReMi Entertainment Awards	VIXX - Chained Up	Hong Seok-cheon, Rosé (Blackpink)

== Episodes (2020) ==
List of episodes in 2020 (episode 90-140)

Ep.	Air Date	Featured Market	Dressing Theme Concept	Song Questions + Snack Time Game	Guest(s)
90	January 4	Yeonggwang Terminal Market, Yeonggwang	2020 Geng-Zi Year Let's Play	Mamamoo - Hip	Kim Won-hee
90	January 4	Yeonggwang Terminal Market, Yeonggwang	2020 Geng-Zi Year Let's Play	Relation Between The Two?	Kim Won-hee
90	January 4	Yeonggwang Terminal Market, Yeonggwang	2020 Geng-Zi Year Let's Play	Seomoon Tak - Chain	Kim Won-hee
91	January 11	Baran Mansae Market, Hwaseong	DoReMi In The SF Movie	Girls' Generation - Echo	SF9 (Inseong, Rowoon)
91	January 11	Baran Mansae Market, Hwaseong	DoReMi In The SF Movie	I Can See Your Title (Dramas)	SF9 (Inseong, Rowoon)
91	January 11	Baran Mansae Market, Hwaseong	DoReMi In The SF Movie	Hockee (feat. Yoo Sang-bong) - Balloon Dog	SF9 (Inseong, Rowoon)
92	January 18	Jayu Market, Busan	Running People	Cool - Sleep Again	Jee Seok-jin, Yang Se-chan
92	January 18	Jayu Market, Busan	Running People	Noraebang Accompaniment Quiz (Trot Songs)	Jee Seok-jin, Yang Se-chan
92	January 18	Jayu Market, Busan	Running People	Han Young-ae - Nonsense	Jee Seok-jin, Yang Se-chan
93	January 25	Chilseong Market, Daegu	Magpie, Magpie's Seollal	Red Velvet - Psycho	Jung Joon-ho, Lee Yi-kyung, Lee Yong-jin
93	January 25	Chilseong Market, Daegu	Magpie, Magpie's Seollal	Doppelganger Quiz	Jung Joon-ho, Lee Yi-kyung, Lee Yong-jin
93	January 25	Chilseong Market, Daegu	Magpie, Magpie's Seollal	Riaa - Personality	Jung Joon-ho, Lee Yi-kyung, Lee Yong-jin
94	February 1	Malbawoo Market, Gwangju	The Men Who Laugh	Seventeen - Clap	Kyuhyun (Super Junior), Suho (EXO), Lee Yong-jin
94	February 1	Malbawoo Market, Gwangju	The Men Who Laugh	Lyrics Reading Quiz	Kyuhyun (Super Junior), Suho (EXO), Lee Yong-jin
94	February 1	Malbawoo Market, Gwangju	The Men Who Laugh	Kim Tae-woo (g.o.d) - Memories and Remembrance	Kyuhyun (Super Junior), Suho (EXO), Lee Yong-jin
95	February 8	Dongmyo Flea Market, Seoul	Dongmyo Style	Jinusean (feat. Uhm Jung-hwa) - Tell Me	GFriend (Yuju, Umji), Lee Yong-jin (Note: Standing in for Kim Dong-hyun)
95	February 8	Dongmyo Flea Market, Seoul	Dongmyo Style	Consonants Quiz (Korean Fried Chicken Brands)	GFriend (Yuju, Umji), Lee Yong-jin
95	February 8	Dongmyo Flea Market, Seoul	Dongmyo Style	Bolbbalgan4 - 25	GFriend (Yuju, Umji), Lee Yong-jin
96	February 15	Yongmun Millennium Market, Yangpyeong	Rowdy Exorcism Banquet	Cho Yong-pil - Red Dragonfly	Sung Dong-il, Uhm Ji-won
96	February 15	Yongmun Millennium Market, Yangpyeong	Rowdy Exorcism Banquet	I Can See Your Title (Movies, Dramas)	Sung Dong-il, Uhm Ji-won
96	February 15	Yongmun Millennium Market, Yangpyeong	Rowdy Exorcism Banquet	Zico (Block B) - Any Song	Sung Dong-il, Uhm Ji-won
97	February 22	Geumnam Market, Seoul	I Want To Get Attention (1)	T-ara - Like The First Time	Lee Ji-hye, DinDin, Ravi (VIXX)
97	February 22	Geumnam Market, Seoul	I Want To Get Attention (1)	Noraebang Accompaniment Quiz	Lee Ji-hye, DinDin, Ravi (VIXX)
97	February 22	Geumnam Market, Seoul	I Want To Get Attention (1)	Davichi - Again	Lee Ji-hye, DinDin, Ravi (VIXX)
Special 3 (Note: This episode is an unaired special. It was originally supposed to be aired on November 9, 2019, but was not aired due to the Mnet vote manipulation investigation.)	February 26	Sanbon Traditional Market, Gunpo	I Want To Get Attention (2)	f(x) - Pinocchio (Danger)	IZ*ONE (Choi Ye-na, Jang Won-young)
Special 3	February 26	Sanbon Traditional Market, Gunpo	I Want To Get Attention (2)	New/Old Neologism Quiz	IZ*ONE (Choi Ye-na, Jang Won-young)
Special 3	February 26	Sanbon Traditional Market, Gunpo	I Want To Get Attention (2)	Hyun Jin-young - Break Me Down	IZ*ONE (Choi Ye-na, Jang Won-young)
98	February 29	Sammi Market, Siheung	Leap Day Special Moon Moon What Moon	Changmo - Meteor	Noel (Na Sung-ho, Kang Kyun-sung)
98	February 29	Sammi Market, Siheung	Leap Day Special Moon Moon What Moon	Find The Original Singer	Noel (Na Sung-ho, Kang Kyun-sung)
98	February 29	Sammi Market, Siheung	Leap Day Special Moon Moon What Moon	O.P.P.A 007 - Come! Come!	Noel (Na Sung-ho, Kang Kyun-sung)
99	March 7	—N/a (Note: There is no featured market in this 2-episode special. From the 96 markets featured and 294 types of food previously featured, several types of foods will return for this special.)	AS 100 Days Party	Turbo - Twist King	Hong Seok-cheon, Yoo Se-yoon, Han Hye-jin, Yura (Girl's Day), Taeyeon (Girls' Generation), Ravi (VIXX), Kim Min-kyung (Note: Joins Small-mouthed Haetnim in eating the food when there's a failed attempt in song dictation.)
99	March 7	—N/a	AS 100 Days Party	Consonants Quiz (Snack Brands); Noraebang Accompaniment Quiz	Hong Seok-cheon, Yoo Se-yoon, Han Hye-jin, Yura (Girl's Day), Taeyeon (Girls' Generation), Ravi (VIXX), Kim Min-kyung
100	March 14	—N/a	AS 100 Days Party	BTS - Idol	Hong Seok-cheon, Yoo Se-yoon, Han Hye-jin, Yura (Girl's Day), Taeyeon (Girls' Generation), Ravi (VIXX), Kim Min-kyung
100	March 14	—N/a	AS 100 Days Party	Lyrics Reading Quiz; Doppelganger Quiz (Actors/Actresses)	Hong Seok-cheon, Yoo Se-yoon, Han Hye-jin, Yura (Girl's Day), Taeyeon (Girls' Generation), Ravi (VIXX), Kim Min-kyung
101	March 21	Seomun Market, Cheongju	World Water Day Special; AnyhoWater Fashion	Yoon Si-nae - Dating	Hong Jin-kyung, Nam Chang-hee
101	March 21	Seomun Market, Cheongju	World Water Day Special; AnyhoWater Fashion	Doppelganger Quiz (Variety Shows)	Hong Jin-kyung, Nam Chang-hee
101	March 21	Seomun Market, Cheongju	World Water Day Special; AnyhoWater Fashion	SHINee - Clue	Hong Jin-kyung, Nam Chang-hee
102	March 28	Buyeo Central Market, Buyeo	Spring Spring Spring, Spring is Here	Turtles - Bingo	Song So-hee, Jeon So-mi
102	March 28	Buyeo Central Market, Buyeo	Spring Spring Spring, Spring is Here	New/Old Neologism Quiz	Song So-hee, Jeon So-mi
102	March 28	Buyeo Central Market, Buyeo	Spring Spring Spring, Spring is Here	Kim Yeon-woo - Homesick	Song So-hee, Jeon So-mi
Special 4	April 4	Indoor Spring Welcoming Special (Note: Due to the impact of COVID-19 pandemic in South Korea, there is no new episode on this day, and it is replaced with a special episode.)			—N/a
103	April 11	Hwayang Jeil Alley Market, Seoul	Tree I Love You	Mamamoo - Décalcomanie	Girls' Generation (Sunny, Hyoyeon)
103	April 11	Hwayang Jeil Alley Market, Seoul	Tree I Love You	Choreography Décalcomanie Quiz	Girls' Generation (Sunny, Hyoyeon)
103	April 11	Hwayang Jeil Alley Market, Seoul	Tree I Love You	Im Chang-jung - What! What!	Girls' Generation (Sunny, Hyoyeon)
104	April 18	Majang Meat Market, Seoul	The Thieves	U-Know Yunho (TVXQ) - Why	Max Changmin (TVXQ), Kyuhyun (Super Junior)
104	April 18	Majang Meat Market, Seoul	The Thieves	Consonants Quiz (2000s Songs Titles)	Max Changmin (TVXQ), Kyuhyun (Super Junior)
104	April 18	Majang Meat Market, Seoul	The Thieves	To-ya - Look	Max Changmin (TVXQ), Kyuhyun (Super Junior)
105	April 25	Saemgoeul Market, Jeongeup	Soonpoong Soonpoong Gynecology Clinic	Click-B - Undefeatable	Park Mi-sun, Lee Jin-hyuk (UP10TION)
105	April 25	Saemgoeul Market, Jeongeup	Soonpoong Soonpoong Gynecology Clinic	Love Love Couple Quiz	Park Mi-sun, Lee Jin-hyuk (UP10TION)
105	April 25	Saemgoeul Market, Jeongeup	Soonpoong Soonpoong Gynecology Clinic	Stella Jang - Alcoholman	Park Mi-sun, Lee Jin-hyuk (UP10TION)
106	May 2	Gyeongdong Market, Seoul	Oh My Campus	Carnival - Go Get Her	Oh My Girl (Hyojung, Arin)
106	May 2	Gyeongdong Market, Seoul	Oh My Campus	Find The Original Singer	Oh My Girl (Hyojung, Arin)
106	May 2	Gyeongdong Market, Seoul	Oh My Campus	TXT - 9 and Three Quarters (Run Away)	Oh My Girl (Hyojung, Arin)
107	May 9	Moraenae Market, Seoul	Fantastic Fairies and Where to Find Them	Lovelyz - Destiny	Super Junior (Leeteuk, Eunhyuk)
107	May 9	Moraenae Market, Seoul	Fantastic Fairies and Where to Find Them	What's Your Name? (Mobile Phones)	Super Junior (Leeteuk, Eunhyuk)
107	May 9	Moraenae Market, Seoul	Fantastic Fairies and Where to Find Them	ZE:A - Mazeltov	Super Junior (Leeteuk, Eunhyuk)
108	May 16	Bupyeong Market, Incheon	The Day for DoReMi to Flex	Cool - Misery	Zico (Block B), Minah (Girl's Day)
108	May 16	Bupyeong Market, Incheon	The Day for DoReMi to Flex	Noraebang Accompaniment Quiz	Zico (Block B), Minah (Girl's Day)
108	May 16	Bupyeong Market, Incheon	The Day for DoReMi to Flex	Dean - bonnie & clyde	Zico (Block B), Minah (Girl's Day)
109	May 23	Mangwon Market, Seoul	Today I'm The Cooking King	Gloomy 30's - Change	Yoon Doo-joon (Highlight), Jeong Se-woon
109	May 23	Mangwon Market, Seoul	Today I'm The Cooking King	Doppelganger Quiz (Actors/Actresses)	Yoon Doo-joon (Highlight), Jeong Se-woon
109	May 23	Mangwon Market, Seoul	Today I'm The Cooking King	Lee So-eun - Kitchen	Yoon Doo-joon (Highlight), Jeong Se-woon
110	May 30	Saemaeul Traditional Market, Seoul	At Here I'm Another Level	Kim Won-jun - You're Mine	Red Velvet (Irene, Seulgi)
110	May 30	Saemaeul Traditional Market, Seoul	At Here I'm Another Level	Lyrics Feeling Drama Quiz	Red Velvet (Irene, Seulgi)
110	May 30	Saemaeul Traditional Market, Seoul	At Here I'm Another Level	Zion.T - Ideal	Red Velvet (Irene, Seulgi)
111	June 6	Osaek/Five Colours Market, Osan	Extreme Job	IU (feat. Suga (BTS)) - eight	Cha Tae-hyun, Lee Sun-bin
111	June 6	Osaek/Five Colours Market, Osan	Extreme Job	Guess Them Right! Homes	Cha Tae-hyun, Lee Sun-bin
111	June 6	Osaek/Five Colours Market, Osan	Extreme Job	Taesaja - Affection	Cha Tae-hyun, Lee Sun-bin
112 (Note: First episode in the show's history to use the same particular song in both song dictation rounds.)	June 13	Nammun Market, Suwon	The Three Musketeers	Diva - Perfect!	Super Junior-K.R.Y.
112	June 13	Nammun Market, Suwon	The Three Musketeers	Gag Corner Title Quiz	Super Junior-K.R.Y.
112	June 13	Nammun Market, Suwon	The Three Musketeers	Diva - Perfect!	Super Junior-K.R.Y.
113	June 20	Yeokgok Sahngsahng Market, Bucheon	My Future Hopes Are?	EXO - Girl x Friend	Jeong Dong-won, Kim Kang-hoon
113	June 20	Yeokgok Sahngsahng Market, Bucheon	My Future Hopes Are?	Consonants Quiz (Drinks Brands)	Jeong Dong-won, Kim Kang-hoon
113	June 20	Yeokgok Sahngsahng Market, Bucheon	My Future Hopes Are?	Oh My Girl - Bungee (Fall in Love)	Jeong Dong-won, Kim Kang-hoon
114	June 27	Gwangjang Market, Seoul	Wow! It's Summer	AKMU - Idea	Seventeen (Woozi, Seungkwan)
114	June 27	Gwangjang Market, Seoul	Wow! It's Summer	Lyrics Reading Quiz	Seventeen (Woozi, Seungkwan)
114	June 27	Gwangjang Market, Seoul	Wow! It's Summer	Maya - Coolly	Seventeen (Woozi, Seungkwan)
115	July 4	Onyang Oncheon Traditional Market, Asan	What's My Style	NRG - Hurray For a Virile Son of Korea	NU'EST (Minhyun, Ren)
115	July 4	Onyang Oncheon Traditional Market, Asan	What's My Style	New/Old Neologism Quiz	NU'EST (Minhyun, Ren)
115	July 4	Onyang Oncheon Traditional Market, Asan	What's My Style	Blackpink - See U Later	NU'EST (Minhyun, Ren)
116	July 11	Central Market, Samcheok	Hot Hot	Boom - Beautiful	Jang Min-ho, Young Tak
116	July 11	Central Market, Samcheok	Hot Hot	Noraebang Accompaniment Quiz	Jang Min-ho, Young Tak
116	July 11	Central Market, Samcheok	Hot Hot	Red Velvet - Rookie	Jang Min-ho, Young Tak
117	July 18	Donam Jeil Market, Seoul	Young Power, Open Your Ears	Norazo - Rock Star	Jo Kwon (2AM), Seo Eun-kwang (BtoB)
117	July 18	Donam Jeil Market, Seoul	Young Power, Open Your Ears	Lyrics Reading Quiz	Jo Kwon (2AM), Seo Eun-kwang (BtoB)
117	July 18	Donam Jeil Market, Seoul	Young Power, Open Your Ears	Apink - Dumhdurum	Jo Kwon (2AM), Seo Eun-kwang (BtoB)
118	July 25	Wonju Traditional Market, Wonju	I Am EXO	Jang Beom-june - Crush	EXO (Baekhyun, Chanyeol, Kai)
118	July 25	Wonju Traditional Market, Wonju	I Am EXO	Lyrics Feeling Drama Quiz	EXO (Baekhyun, Chanyeol, Kai)
118	July 25	Wonju Traditional Market, Wonju	I Am EXO	Ravi (VIXX) (feat. Paloalto) - Rock Star	EXO (Baekhyun, Chanyeol, Kai)
119	August 1	Yeonseo Market, Seoul	Killers of the Century	Lady Gaga + Blackpink - Sour Candy	Hwang Jung-min, Park Jeong-min
119	August 1	Yeonseo Market, Seoul	Killers of the Century	Consonants Quiz (Korean Movies)	Hwang Jung-min, Park Jeong-min
119	August 1	Yeonseo Market, Seoul	Killers of the Century	Uptown - Back To Me	Hwang Jung-min, Park Jeong-min
120	August 8	Jecheon Traditional Market, Jecheon	Christmas in August	Hwasa (Mamamoo) - Maria	Solji (EXID), Baek A-yeon
120	August 8	Jecheon Traditional Market, Jecheon	Christmas in August	New/Old OST Quiz (Dramas)	Solji (EXID), Baek A-yeon
120	August 8	Jecheon Traditional Market, Jecheon	Christmas in August	ZE:A - The Ghost of Wind	Solji (EXID), Baek A-yeon
121	August 15	Jeongneung Market, Seoul	AS Air	Buck - The Age of Success	Uhm Jung-hwa, Park Sung-woong
121	August 15	Jeongneung Market, Seoul	AS Air	Doppelganger Quiz	Uhm Jung-hwa, Park Sung-woong
121	August 15	Jeongneung Market, Seoul	AS Air	Secret - Poison	Uhm Jung-hwa, Park Sung-woong
122	August 22	Wondang Market, Goyang	() Kids	Crush (feat. Joy (Red Velvet)) - Mayday	(G)I-dle (Miyeon, Soyeon)
122	August 22	Wondang Market, Goyang	() Kids	Choreography Décalcomanie Quiz	(G)I-dle (Miyeon, Soyeon)
122	August 22	Wondang Market, Goyang	() Kids	Ateez - THANXX	(G)I-dle (Miyeon, Soyeon)
123	August 29	Nambu Alley Market, Seoul	La La Land	Oh My Girl - Nonstop	Rhymer, Ravi (VIXX)
123	August 29	Nambu Alley Market, Seoul	La La Land	Consonants Quiz (2000s Songs Titles)	Rhymer, Ravi (VIXX)
123	August 29	Nambu Alley Market, Seoul	La La Land	Chakra - Oh! My Boy	Rhymer, Ravi (VIXX)
124	September 5	Seongnam Traditional Market, Seongnam	I'm Not The Person You Used To Know	Park Nam-jung - Days With Rain	Kim Eui-sung, Kim Dae-myung
124	September 5	Seongnam Traditional Market, Seongnam	I'm Not The Person You Used To Know	Doppelganger Quiz (Actors/Actresses)	Kim Eui-sung, Kim Dae-myung
124	September 5	Seongnam Traditional Market, Seongnam	I'm Not The Person You Used To Know	Seventeen - Boom Boom	Kim Eui-sung, Kim Dae-myung
125	September 12	Seonam New Market, Daegu	I'm A Vocal	Ryang Hyun Ryang Ha (feat. Park Ji-yoon) - She Was 2 Years Older	Lee Ji-hye, Hwang Kwang-hee (ZE:A)
125	September 12	Seonam New Market, Daegu	I'm A Vocal	Lyrics Feeling Drama Quiz	Lee Ji-hye, Hwang Kwang-hee (ZE:A)
125	September 12	Seonam New Market, Daegu	I'm A Vocal	Lee Seung-hwan - Where is My Girl	Lee Ji-hye, Hwang Kwang-hee (ZE:A)
126	September 19	Sinpo International Market, Incheon	Things That Happened in 1999	2AM - I Was Wrong	Lee Na-eun (April), Kim Do-yeon (Weki Meki)
126	September 19	Sinpo International Market, Incheon	Things That Happened in 1999	New/Old OST Quiz (Dramas)	Lee Na-eun (April), Kim Do-yeon (Weki Meki)
126	September 19	Sinpo International Market, Incheon	Things That Happened in 1999	Changmo (feat. Chungha) - Remedy	Lee Na-eun (April), Kim Do-yeon (Weki Meki)
127	September 26	International Central Market, Pyeongtaek	_____'s Magicians	BTS - Go Go	Code Kunst, Lee Hi
127	September 26	International Central Market, Pyeongtaek	_____'s Magicians	Consonants Quiz (Ramyeon Brands)	Code Kunst, Lee Hi
127	September 26	International Central Market, Pyeongtaek	_____'s Magicians	Jessi - Nunu Nana	Code Kunst, Lee Hi
128	October 3	Arirang Market, Miryang	Fantasy Action Romance	Yang Bae-chu - That Girl's Phone Number	Lee Dong-wook, Kim Bum, Jo Bo-ah
128	October 3	Arirang Market, Miryang	Fantasy Action Romance	Guess Them Right! Homes	Lee Dong-wook, Kim Bum, Jo Bo-ah
128	October 3	Arirang Market, Miryang	Fantasy Action Romance	Mamamoo - Aze Gag	Lee Dong-wook, Kim Bum, Jo Bo-ah
129	October 10	Urim Market, Seoul	World Class	Itzy - Not Shy	Blackpink (Jisoo, Rosé)
129	October 10	Urim Market, Seoul	World Class	Noraebang Accompaniment Quiz	Blackpink (Jisoo, Rosé)
129	October 10	Urim Market, Seoul	World Class	g.o.d (feat. IU) - Sing For Me	Blackpink (Jisoo, Rosé)
130	October 17	Hwangji Free Market, Taebaek	People Doing The Search	Super Junior (feat. f(x)) - Oops!	Jang Dong-yoon, Krystal Jung (f(x))
130	October 17	Hwangji Free Market, Taebaek	People Doing The Search	Love Love Couple Quiz	Jang Dong-yoon, Krystal Jung (f(x))
130	October 17	Hwangji Free Market, Taebaek	People Doing The Search	Fin.K.L - Time of Mask	Jang Dong-yoon, Krystal Jung (f(x))
131	October 24	New Central Market, Jeonju	Reporting	Psy (feat. G-Dragon (BigBang)) - Tree Frog	Hanhae, Key (Shinee)
131	October 24	New Central Market, Jeonju	Reporting	Find The Original Singer	Hanhae, Key (Shinee)
131	October 24	New Central Market, Jeonju	Reporting	Gigs - Village Music Brigade	Hanhae, Key (Shinee)
132	October 31	Mokdong Kkabi Market, Seoul	My 5th Debut Anniversary	AKMU - Love in the Milky Way Cafe	Twice (Nayeon, Jihyo, Dahyun)
132	October 31	Mokdong Kkabi Market, Seoul	My 5th Debut Anniversary	New/Old Neologism Quiz	Twice (Nayeon, Jihyo, Dahyun)
132	October 31	Mokdong Kkabi Market, Seoul	My 5th Debut Anniversary	BESTie - Love Options	Twice (Nayeon, Jihyo, Dahyun)
133	November 7	Youngcheon Independence Gate Market, Seoul	DoReMi Farm	Zaza - She Came	Lee Juck, John Park
133	November 7	Youngcheon Independence Gate Market, Seoul	DoReMi Farm	Lyrics Reading Quiz	Lee Juck, John Park
133	November 7	Youngcheon Independence Gate Market, Seoul	DoReMi Farm	Zico (Block B) - I Am You, You Are Me	Lee Juck, John Park
134	November 14	Inhyeon Market, Seoul	Power Entertainers	Seventeen - Adore U	—N/a
134	November 14	Inhyeon Market, Seoul	Power Entertainers	Noraebang Accompaniment Quiz	—N/a
134	November 14	Inhyeon Market, Seoul	Power Entertainers	Hockee - Best in the Universe!	—N/a
135	November 21	Gwango Traditional Market, Icheon	Win Win	Girl's Day - Ring My Bell	Taemin (Shinee), Kai (EXO)
135	November 21	Gwango Traditional Market, Icheon	Win Win	Who Are Today's 1st Place Nominees?	Taemin (Shinee), Kai (EXO)
135	November 21	Gwango Traditional Market, Icheon	Win Win	B.B - Tragic Love	Taemin (Shinee), Kai (EXO)
136	November 28	Yuseong Market, Daejeon	Ah Ee (Note: Korean vowels "ㅏㅣ")	DJ DOC - Together	Ravi (VIXX), Kai (EXO)
136	November 28	Yuseong Market, Daejeon	Ah Ee	Consonants Quiz (Korean Fried Chicken Brands)	Ravi (VIXX), Kai (EXO)
136	November 28	Yuseong Market, Daejeon	Ah Ee	Lovelyz - Now, We	Ravi (VIXX), Kai (EXO)
137	December 5	Jukdo Market, Pohang	After The CSAT is Over	Urban Zakapa (feat. Beenzino) - Seoul Night	Lee Yong-jin, Lee Jin-ho
137	December 5	Jukdo Market, Pohang	After The CSAT is Over	Lyrics Feeling Drama Quiz	Lee Yong-jin, Lee Jin-ho
137	December 5	Jukdo Market, Pohang	After The CSAT is Over	CL - MTBD (Mental Breakdown)	Lee Yong-jin, Lee Jin-ho
138	December 12	Sejong Traditional Market, Sejong	Back To The 8090	Ryang Hyun Ryang Ha - What's The Dance?	Ryu Seung-ryong, Yum Jung-ah
138	December 12	Sejong Traditional Market, Sejong	Back To The 8090	Doppelganger Quiz (Actors/Actresses)	Ryu Seung-ryong, Yum Jung-ah
138	December 12	Sejong Traditional Market, Sejong	Back To The 8090	Jawsh 685, Jason Derulo, BTS - Savage Love (Laxed - Siren Beat) (BTS Remix)	Ryu Seung-ryong, Yum Jung-ah
139 (Note: Moon Se-yoon fills in as MC due to Boom being on self-quarantine.)	December 19	Incheon Complex Fish Market, Incheon	Christmas	Twice - Hell in Heaven	Don Mills, Song Min-ho (Winner)
139	December 19	Incheon Complex Fish Market, Incheon	Christmas	Guess The Debut Song	Don Mills, Song Min-ho (Winner)
139	December 19	Incheon Complex Fish Market, Incheon	Christmas	Giriboy (feat. The Quiett, Bewhy) - Skyblue	Don Mills, Song Min-ho (Winner)
140 (Note: Key fills in as MC due to Boom being on self-quarantine.)	December 26	Bukbu Market, Cheongju	DoReMi Awards	Wonder Girls - I Feel You	Kim Seon-ho, Heize
140	December 26	Bukbu Market, Cheongju	DoReMi Awards	Dialect Tour	Kim Seon-ho, Heize
140	December 26	Bukbu Market, Cheongju	DoReMi Awards	Sunny Hill - Princess and Prince Charming	Kim Seon-ho, Heize

== Episodes (2021) ==
List of episodes in 2021 (episode 141-192)

Ep.	Air Date	Featured Market	Dressing Theme Concept	Song Questions + Snack Time Game	Guest(s)
141	January 2	Seongdae Traditional Market, Seoul	The Century's Duos	Lexa - Love Valentine	Nam Chang-hee, Jo Se-ho
141	January 2	Seongdae Traditional Market, Seoul	The Century's Duos	Find The Source of This Meme	Nam Chang-hee, Jo Se-ho
141	January 2	Seongdae Traditional Market, Seoul	The Century's Duos	BtoB - All Wolves Except Me	Nam Chang-hee, Jo Se-ho
142	January 9	Yaksu Market, Seoul	Short-lived Resolutions	Nine Muses - Drama	Weki Meki (Choi Yoo-jung, Kim Do-yeon)
142	January 9	Yaksu Market, Seoul	Short-lived Resolutions	Choreography Décalcomanie Quiz	Weki Meki (Choi Yoo-jung, Kim Do-yeon)
142	January 9	Yaksu Market, Seoul	Short-lived Resolutions	g.o.d - Sky Blue Promise	Weki Meki (Choi Yoo-jung, Kim Do-yeon)
143	January 16	Busanjin Market, Busan	AS Photo Studio	Cool - Woman in the Snow	Epik High (Tablo, DJ Tukutz)
143	January 16	Busanjin Market, Busan	AS Photo Studio	Find The Original Singer	Epik High (Tablo, DJ Tukutz)
143	January 16	Busanjin Market, Busan	AS Photo Studio	Lovelyz - WoW!	Epik High (Tablo, DJ Tukutz)
144	January 23	Nangman Market, Chuncheon	Noir	Max Changmin (TVXQ) - Piano	U-Know Yunho (TVXQ), DinDin
144	January 23	Nangman Market, Chuncheon	Noir	Lyrics Feeling Drama Quiz	U-Know Yunho (TVXQ), DinDin
144	January 23	Nangman Market, Chuncheon	Noir	Hello Venus - I'm Ill	U-Know Yunho (TVXQ), DinDin
145	January 30	Geumchon Tongil Market, Paju	What Ends With "ka/ca"? (Note: Korean word "카")	Young Turks Club - Jealousy	Kim Sung-oh, Lee Da-hee
145	January 30	Geumchon Tongil Market, Paju	What Ends With "ka/ca"?	Guess Them Right! Homes	Kim Sung-oh, Lee Da-hee
145	January 30	Geumchon Tongil Market, Paju	What Ends With "ka/ca"?	Sunmi - Noir	Kim Sung-oh, Lee Da-hee
146	February 6	Donam Jeil Market, Seoul	Would You Like To Come To Our Club?	Baby V.O.X - Change	Jaejae, Choi Ye-na (Iz*One)
146	February 6	Donam Jeil Market, Seoul	Would You Like To Come To Our Club?	Who Are Today's 1st Place Nominees?	Jaejae, Choi Ye-na (Iz*One)
146	February 6	Donam Jeil Market, Seoul	Would You Like To Come To Our Club?	—N/a (Note: The second round of song dictation was not recorded due to the longer recording time in the Snack Time segment, and having enough content to air for the episode. The food intended for the aforementioned round of song dictation were then given in full portions to the cast and guests.)	Jaejae, Choi Ye-na (Iz*One)
147	February 13	Tongin Market, Seoul	The Uncanny Seollal	Lee Jung-hyun - Hey!	Jo Byeong-kyu, Kim Se-jeong
147	February 13	Tongin Market, Seoul	The Uncanny Seollal	Love Love Couple Quiz	Jo Byeong-kyu, Kim Se-jeong
147	February 13	Tongin Market, Seoul	The Uncanny Seollal	Davichi (feat. Jay Park) - White	Jo Byeong-kyu, Kim Se-jeong
148	February 20	Inheon Market, Seoul	Aspects of Police Station	Psy (feat. Tablo (Epik High)) - Auto Reverse	Lee Seung-gi, Park Ju-hyun
148	February 20	Inheon Market, Seoul	Aspects of Police Station	Doppelganger Quiz (Actors/Actresses)	Lee Seung-gi, Park Ju-hyun
148	February 20	Inheon Market, Seoul	Aspects of Police Station	Laboum - Shooting Love	Lee Seung-gi, Park Ju-hyun
149	February 27	Amsa Complex Market, Seoul	Shinee's Back	Seventeen - Do Re Mi	Shinee (Onew, Minho)
149	February 27	Amsa Complex Market, Seoul	Shinee's Back	New/Old Neologism Quiz	Shinee (Onew, Minho)
149	February 27	Amsa Complex Market, Seoul	Shinee's Back	Weki Meki - Tiki-Taka (99%)	Shinee (Onew, Minho)
150	March 6	Hyunpung Hundred Years Goblin Market, Daegu	Diva on Stage	Lexy - Girls	Sunmi, Chungha
150	March 6	Hyunpung Hundred Years Goblin Market, Daegu	Diva on Stage	Guess The First Winning Song	Sunmi, Chungha
150	March 6	Hyunpung Hundred Years Goblin Market, Daegu	Diva on Stage	Jessi - Life is Good	Sunmi, Chungha
151	March 13	Bokdae Gagyeong Market, Cheongju	I Need Attention	Gray (feat. Loco) - Just Do It	Ahn So-hee, Kwak Dong-yeon
151	March 13	Bokdae Gagyeong Market, Cheongju	I Need Attention	New/Old OST Quiz (Dramas)	Ahn So-hee, Kwak Dong-yeon
151	March 13	Bokdae Gagyeong Market, Cheongju	I Need Attention	TXT - Drama	Ahn So-hee, Kwak Dong-yeon
152	March 20	Daerim Market & Daerim Alley Market, Seoul	House Party	Koyote - Party Party	Super Junior (Shindong, Eunhyuk)
152	March 20	Daerim Market & Daerim Alley Market, Seoul	House Party	Noraebang Accompaniment Quiz	Super Junior (Shindong, Eunhyuk)
152	March 20	Daerim Market & Daerim Alley Market, Seoul	House Party	Norazo - Ineffective Boss Without Power	Super Junior (Shindong, Eunhyuk)
153 (Note: Surprise appearance by Hyeri (Girl's Day).)	March 27	Gyeyangsan Traditional Market, Incheon	Geniuses of the Century	Got7 - Girls Girls Girls	Astro (Cha Eun-woo, Yoon San-ha)
153	March 27	Gyeyangsan Traditional Market, Incheon	Geniuses of the Century	Guess The Debut Song	Astro (Cha Eun-woo, Yoon San-ha)
153	March 27	Gyeyangsan Traditional Market, Incheon	Geniuses of the Century	Dal Shabet - B.B.B (Big Baby Baby)	Astro (Cha Eun-woo, Yoon San-ha)
154	April 3	Namgwangju Market, Gwangju	Birthday Party	Beenzino - Break	AKMU
154	April 3	Namgwangju Market, Gwangju	Birthday Party	Lyrics Reading Quiz	AKMU
154	April 3	Namgwangju Market, Gwangju	Birthday Party	Hyun-i & Deok-i - Wait A Minute	AKMU
155	April 10	Firefly Yeonmu Market, Suwon	OMG	H.O.T. - Warrior's Descendant	Oh My Girl (Hyojung, Jiho)
155	April 10	Firefly Yeonmu Market, Suwon	OMG	Who Are Today's 1st Place Nominees?	Oh My Girl (Hyojung, Jiho)
155	April 10	Firefly Yeonmu Market, Suwon	OMG	Apink - Drummer Boy	Oh My Girl (Hyojung, Jiho)
156	April 17	Seomun Market, Daegu	Rainy Day	Buzz - Love Comes From the Heart	Chun Woo-hee, Kang Ha-neul
156	April 17	Seomun Market, Daegu	Rainy Day	Guess Them Right! Homes	Chun Woo-hee, Kang Ha-neul
156	April 17	Seomun Market, Daegu	Rainy Day	Mamamoo - Dingga	Chun Woo-hee, Kang Ha-neul
157	April 24	Haengdang Market, Seoul	It's Leisure Time	IU - Coin	Treasure (Jihoon, Park Jeong-woo)
157	April 24	Haengdang Market, Seoul	It's Leisure Time	Guess The First Winning Song	Treasure (Jihoon, Park Jeong-woo)
157	April 24	Haengdang Market, Seoul	It's Leisure Time	Brave Girls - We Ride	Treasure (Jihoon, Park Jeong-woo)
158	May 1	Central Market, Yongin	Generation Generation What Generation	APOKI - Get It Out	Girls' Generation (Hyoyeon, Yuri)
158	May 1	Central Market, Yongin	Generation Generation What Generation	Consonants Quiz (21st Century's Songs Titles)	Girls' Generation (Hyoyeon, Yuri)
158	May 1	Central Market, Yongin	Generation Generation What Generation	V.O.S - Cry	Girls' Generation (Hyoyeon, Yuri)
159	May 8	Dongbu Market, Seoul	I Have (OO)	BTS - Save ME	Itzy (Lia, Ryujin)
159	May 8	Dongbu Market, Seoul	I Have (OO)	Who Is Today's Ending Fairy?	Itzy (Lia, Ryujin)
159	May 8	Dongbu Market, Seoul	I Have (OO)	Monsta X - Shoot Out	Itzy (Lia, Ryujin)
160	May 15	Hupyeong Ildanji Market, Chuncheon	Amazing Couples	Uhm Jung-hwa - Poison	Hong Hyun-hee, Jasson
160	May 15	Hupyeong Ildanji Market, Chuncheon	Amazing Couples	Noraebang Accompaniment Quiz	Hong Hyun-hee, Jasson
160	May 15	Hupyeong Ildanji Market, Chuncheon	Amazing Couples	Nine Muses A - Lip 2 Lip	Hong Hyun-hee, Jasson
161	May 22	Nambu Market, Jeonju	Let's Live Together	g.o.d - With Little Man	Jang Ki-yong, Hyeri (Girl's Day)
161	May 22	Nambu Market, Jeonju	Let's Live Together	Lyrics Feeling Drama Quiz	Jang Ki-yong, Hyeri (Girl's Day)
161	May 22	Nambu Market, Jeonju	Let's Live Together	Hwasa (Mamamoo) - Kidding	Jang Ki-yong, Hyeri (Girl's Day)
162	May 29	Jungni Traditional Market, Daejeon	NUWho~?!	Gaeko (Dynamic Duo) - Rhythm Is Life (Feeling So Good)	NU'EST (Minhyun, Ren)
162	May 29	Jungni Traditional Market, Daejeon	NUWho~?!	New/Old OST Quiz (Dramas)	NU'EST (Minhyun, Ren)
162	May 29	Jungni Traditional Market, Daejeon	NUWho~?!	ONF - Yayaya	NU'EST (Minhyun, Ren)
163	June 5	Namguro Market, Seoul	Good Night	Sharp - Lying	Sung Si-kyung, Kim Hae-jun
163	June 5	Namguro Market, Seoul	Good Night	Find The Original Singer	Sung Si-kyung, Kim Hae-jun
163	June 5	Namguro Market, Seoul	Good Night	K.Will (feat. Beenzino) - Bon Voyage	Sung Si-kyung, Kim Hae-jun
164	June 12	Sinjang Traditional Market, Hanam	Passion! Passion! Passion!	Lee Hyo-ri - Straight Up	Twice (Sana, Dahyun)
164	June 12	Sinjang Traditional Market, Hanam	Passion! Passion! Passion!	Who Are Today's 1st Place Nominees?	Twice (Sana, Dahyun)
164	June 12	Sinjang Traditional Market, Hanam	Passion! Passion! Passion!	GFriend - Mermaid	Twice (Sana, Dahyun)
165	June 19	Hoengseong Traditional Market, Hoengseong	I'm A Man	Zico (Block B) - No You Can't	Seventeen (S.Coups, Hoshi, Seungkwan)
165	June 19	Hoengseong Traditional Market, Hoengseong	I'm A Man	Who Is Today's Ending Fairy?	Seventeen (S.Coups, Hoshi, Seungkwan)
165	June 19	Hoengseong Traditional Market, Hoengseong	I'm A Man	T-ara - So Crazy	Seventeen (S.Coups, Hoshi, Seungkwan)
166	June 26	Starlight Nammun Market, Seoul	Let's Go! Reversal Trip	Monsta X - Trespass	Brave Girls (Minyoung, Yujeong)
166	June 26	Starlight Nammun Market, Seoul	Let's Go! Reversal Trip	Voice Support Quiz (Advertisements)	Brave Girls (Minyoung, Yujeong)
166	June 26	Starlight Nammun Market, Seoul	Let's Go! Reversal Trip	Oh My Girl - NE♡N	Brave Girls (Minyoung, Yujeong)
167	July 3	Gwangcheon Traditional Market, Hongseong	Words That Start With "tu" (Note: Korean word "투")	Seventeen - Run To You	TXT (Yeonjun, Beomgyu)
167	July 3	Gwangcheon Traditional Market, Hongseong	Words That Start With "tu"	Lyrics Feeling Drama Quiz	TXT (Yeonjun, Beomgyu)
167	July 3	Gwangcheon Traditional Market, Hongseong	Words That Start With "tu"	Lovelyz - Dream in a Dream	TXT (Yeonjun, Beomgyu)
168	July 10	Hwayang Jeil Alley Market, Seoul	I Want To Advance My Career Abroad	G-Dragon (BigBang) - One of a Kind	Defconn, Jung Hyung-don
168	July 10	Hwayang Jeil Alley Market, Seoul	I Want To Advance My Career Abroad	Consonants Quiz (Ramyeon Brands)	Defconn, Jung Hyung-don
168	July 10	Hwayang Jeil Alley Market, Seoul	I Want To Advance My Career Abroad	Day6 - Ouch	Defconn, Jung Hyung-don
169	July 17	Yongmun Traditional Market, Seoul	The Witches' Chatter	Turbo - Napoleon	Song Ji-hyo, Chae Jong-hyeop
169	July 17	Yongmun Traditional Market, Seoul	The Witches' Chatter	I Can See Your Title (Movies & Dramas)	Song Ji-hyo, Chae Jong-hyeop
169	July 17	Yongmun Traditional Market, Seoul	The Witches' Chatter	WJSN - Happy	Song Ji-hyo, Chae Jong-hyeop
170	July 24	Yangyang Traditional Market, Yangyang	Tomorrow I'm A Musical Star	Lee So-ra - Let Love Stop	Yoon Do-hyun (YB), Lee Hong-gi (F.T. Island)
170	July 24	Yangyang Traditional Market, Yangyang	Tomorrow I'm A Musical Star	Guess The First Winning Song	Yoon Do-hyun (YB), Lee Hong-gi (F.T. Island)
170	July 24	Yangyang Traditional Market, Yangyang	Tomorrow I'm A Musical Star	Golden Child - DamDaDi	Yoon Do-hyun (YB), Lee Hong-gi (F.T. Island)
171	July 31	—N/a (Note: There is no featured market in this 2-episode Summer Special.)	Summer Special #1 - Human AS	Cool - I Want Love	Park Sung-woong, Lee Yong-jin, Jaejae, Lee Sun-bin
171	July 31	—N/a	Summer Special #1 - Human AS	Singing Scene Quiz; Doppelganger Quiz (Actors/Actresses)	Park Sung-woong, Lee Yong-jin, Jaejae, Lee Sun-bin
172 (Note: Park Na-rae fills in as MC due to Boom being on self-quarantine.)	August 7	—N/a	Summer Special #2 - Show! AS-Gayo Countdown	Orange Caramel - Abing Abing	Hwang Kwang-hee (ZE:A), Wooyoung (2PM), Jaejae, Minhyuk (Monsta X), Miyeon ((G)I-dle)
172	August 7	—N/a	Summer Special #2 - Show! AS-Gayo Countdown	Music Show MC Ment Quiz; Who Is Today's Ending Fairy?	Hwang Kwang-hee (ZE:A), Wooyoung (2PM), Jaejae, Minhyuk (Monsta X), Miyeon ((G)I-dle)
173	August 14	Myeongil Traditional Market, Seoul	DoReMi Kingdom	Kim Hyun-jung - Don't You Follow Me	Red Velvet (Joy, Yeri)
173	August 14	Myeongil Traditional Market, Seoul	DoReMi Kingdom	Consonants Quiz (2010s Songs Titles)	Red Velvet (Joy, Yeri)
173	August 14	Myeongil Traditional Market, Seoul	DoReMi Kingdom	Uhm Jung-hwa (feat. Hwasa, DPR Live) - Hop In	Red Velvet (Joy, Yeri)
174	August 21	Sangnam Market, Changwon	The Secret of Longevity	Im Chang-jung - Change of Heart	Kang Jae-jun, Lee Eun-hyung
174	August 21	Sangnam Market, Changwon	The Secret of Longevity	Find The Source of This Meme	Kang Jae-jun, Lee Eun-hyung
174	August 21	Sangnam Market, Changwon	The Secret of Longevity	AKMU - Chocolady	Kang Jae-jun, Lee Eun-hyung
175	August 28	New Central Market, Jeonju	AS Ball	Sumi Jo + Rain - Guardians	Kim So-hyun, Lee Seok-hoon (SG Wannabe)
175	August 28	New Central Market, Jeonju	AS Ball	Find The Original Singer	Kim So-hyun, Lee Seok-hoon (SG Wannabe)
175	August 28	New Central Market, Jeonju	AS Ball	Nemesis - Rose of Versailles	Kim So-hyun, Lee Seok-hoon (SG Wannabe)
176	September 4	Suyu Traditional Market, Seoul	Human Vitamin	Brown Eyed Girls (feat. Uhm Jung-hwa) - Invitation	Jang Young-ran, Choi Yoo-jung (Weki Meki)
176	September 4	Suyu Traditional Market, Seoul	Human Vitamin	Voice Support Quiz (Advertisements)	Jang Young-ran, Choi Yoo-jung (Weki Meki)
176	September 4	Suyu Traditional Market, Seoul	Human Vitamin	Super Junior-D&E - Danger	Jang Young-ran, Choi Yoo-jung (Weki Meki)
177	September 11	Urim Market, Seoul	All Pass	Epik High (feat. Taru) - 1 Minute, 1 Second	Gaeko (Dynamic Duo), Code Kunst
177	September 11	Urim Market, Seoul	All Pass	New/Old Neologism Quiz	Gaeko (Dynamic Duo), Code Kunst
177	September 11	Urim Market, Seoul	All Pass	TXT - What If I Had Been That Puma	Gaeko (Dynamic Duo), Code Kunst
178	September 18	Sinjeong Market, Ulsan	Dancers of the World	Lee Jung-hyun - Eat Well Live Well...	Hyuna, Dawn
178	September 18	Sinjeong Market, Ulsan	Dancers of the World	Choreography Décalcomanie Quiz	Hyuna, Dawn
178	September 18	Sinjeong Market, Ulsan	Dancers of the World	Zico (Block B) (feat. Bibi) - Love & Hate	Hyuna, Dawn
179	September 25	Seomyeon Market, Busan	Words That Start With "A"	BTS - Telepathy	Ateez (San, Wooyoung)
179	September 25	Seomyeon Market, Busan	Words That Start With "A"	Consonants Quiz (Hamburger Brands)	Ateez (San, Wooyoung)
179	September 25	Seomyeon Market, Busan	Words That Start With "A"	Turbo (feat. Lee Ha-neul, Jinu & Lee Sang-min) - Top 10 Songs	Ateez (San, Wooyoung)
180	October 2	Anseong Matchoom Market, Anseong	Twist of a Twist	Jessi - Star	Lee Sang-yeob, Mijoo (Lovelyz)
180	October 2	Anseong Matchoom Market, Anseong	Twist of a Twist	New/Old OST Quiz (Dramas)	Lee Sang-yeob, Mijoo (Lovelyz)
180	October 2	Anseong Matchoom Market, Anseong	Twist of a Twist	Electron Sheep - Sugar Man	Lee Sang-yeob, Mijoo (Lovelyz)
181	October 9	Sangdong Market, Bucheon	Virtual World	S.E.S. - Twilight Zone	Aespa (Karina, Winter)
181	October 9	Sangdong Market, Bucheon	Virtual World	Lyrics Reading Quiz	Aespa (Karina, Winter)
181	October 9	Sangdong Market, Bucheon	Virtual World	Seventeen - GAM3 BO1	Aespa (Karina, Winter)
182	October 16	Daejo Traditional Market, Seoul	Rock Festival	J.ae (feat. Humming Urban Stereo) - Toast	Seventeen (Mingyu, Seungkwan)
182	October 16	Daejo Traditional Market, Seoul	Rock Festival	Noraebang Accompaniment Quiz	Seventeen (Mingyu, Seungkwan)
182	October 16	Daejo Traditional Market, Seoul	Rock Festival	The 5 Emperors - Wonderful Barn	Seventeen (Mingyu, Seungkwan)
183	October 23	Geumnam Daepyeong Market, Sejong	Saturday Mystery	Taesaja - The Way	Yoon Kye-sang (g.o.d), Go Ah-sung
183	October 23	Geumnam Daepyeong Market, Sejong	Saturday Mystery	Guess Them Right! Homes	Yoon Kye-sang (g.o.d), Go Ah-sung
183	October 23	Geumnam Daepyeong Market, Sejong	Saturday Mystery	CL - +HWA+	Yoon Kye-sang (g.o.d), Go Ah-sung
184	October 30	Hwaseo Market, Suwon	I'm A Pro	SHINee - Love Still Goes On	Han Sun-hwa, Jung Eun-ji (Apink), Lee Sun-bin
184	October 30	Hwaseo Market, Suwon	I'm A Pro	Lyrics Feeling Drama Quiz	Han Sun-hwa, Jung Eun-ji (Apink), Lee Sun-bin
184	October 30	Hwaseo Market, Suwon	I'm A Pro	Itzy - Loco	Han Sun-hwa, Jung Eun-ji (Apink), Lee Sun-bin
185	November 6	Ongnyeon Market, Incheon	Street AS Fighter	Winner - Just Dance	Aiki, no:ze
185	November 6	Ongnyeon Market, Incheon	Street AS Fighter	What's Your Name? (Choreography)	Aiki, no:ze
185	November 6	Ongnyeon Market, Incheon	Street AS Fighter	—N/a	Aiki, no:ze
186	November 13	Gongneungdong Goblin Market, Seoul	Nothing Special With the Day	Ha Ji-won - Two-Time	Im Chang-jung, Kyung Soo-jin
186	November 13	Gongneungdong Goblin Market, Seoul	Nothing Special With the Day	Music Video Scene Quiz	Im Chang-jung, Kyung Soo-jin
186	November 13	Gongneungdong Goblin Market, Seoul	Nothing Special With the Day	Little Mix - Wings (Korean Ver.)	Im Chang-jung, Kyung Soo-jin
187	November 20	Gaegeum Alley Market, Busan	Amazing X	Simon Dominic (feat. Loopy, Crush) - Make Her Dance	Monsta X (Minhyuk, Joohoney)
187	November 20	Gaegeum Alley Market, Busan	Amazing X	Consonants Quiz (2000s Songs Titles)	Monsta X (Minhyuk, Joohoney)
187	November 20	Gaegeum Alley Market, Busan	Amazing X	Twice - Rollin'	Monsta X (Minhyuk, Joohoney)
188	November 27	Yangsuri Traditional Market, Yangpyeong	Twinkle Twinkle	Red Velvet - Pose	Mamamoo (Moonbyul, Hwasa)
188	November 27	Yangsuri Traditional Market, Yangpyeong	Twinkle Twinkle	Dialect Tour	Mamamoo (Moonbyul, Hwasa)
188	November 27	Yangsuri Traditional Market, Yangpyeong	Twinkle Twinkle	Lee Young-ji (feat. Woo Won-jae, Changmo, & The Quiett) - Go High	Mamamoo (Moonbyul, Hwasa)
189	December 4	Macheon Central Market, Seoul	I'm A Gen MZ	Crying Nut - Funny Song	Jeon Somi, Lee Young-ji
189	December 4	Macheon Central Market, Seoul	I'm A Gen MZ	Noraebang Accompaniment Quiz	Jeon Somi, Lee Young-ji
189	December 4	Macheon Central Market, Seoul	I'm A Gen MZ	Park Moon-chi - MBTI	Jeon Somi, Lee Young-ji
190	December 11	Seongseo Central Market, Chungju	Bad X & Crazy X	Sharp - Yes	Lee Dong-wook, Wi Ha-joon
190	December 11	Seongseo Central Market, Chungju	Bad X & Crazy X	New/Old OST Quiz (Dramas)	Lee Dong-wook, Wi Ha-joon
190	December 11	Seongseo Central Market, Chungju	Bad X & Crazy X	WJSN - Mr. Badboy	Lee Dong-wook, Wi Ha-joon
191	December 18	Gocheok Neighborhood Market, Seoul	Won't Die	Kim Jin-pyo (feat. Kim Jin-ho (SG Wannabe)) - Romantic Winter	Lee Jin-wook, Gong Seung-yeon
191	December 18	Gocheok Neighborhood Market, Seoul	Won't Die	New/Old Neologism Quiz	Lee Jin-wook, Gong Seung-yeon
191	December 18	Gocheok Neighborhood Market, Seoul	Won't Die	EXID - DDD	Lee Jin-wook, Gong Seung-yeon
192	December 25	Dongsong Traditional Market, Cheorwon	Ghost Christmas	Turbo - White Love	Rain, Kim Bum
192	December 25	Dongsong Traditional Market, Cheorwon	Ghost Christmas	Find The Source of This Meme	Rain, Kim Bum
192	December 25	Dongsong Traditional Market, Cheorwon	Ghost Christmas	Apink - It Girl	Rain, Kim Bum

== Episodes (2022) ==
List of episodes in 2022 (episode 193-244)

Ep.	Air Date	Featured Market	Dressing Theme Concept	Song Questions + Snack Time Game	Guest(s)
193	January 1	Ahyeon Market, Seoul	Got To Catch This Year	Goofy - Everything Will Be Fine	Cho Jin-woong, Choi Woo-shik
193	January 1	Ahyeon Market, Seoul	Got To Catch This Year	Doppelganger Quiz (Actors/Actresses)	Cho Jin-woong, Choi Woo-shik
193	January 1	Ahyeon Market, Seoul	Got To Catch This Year	OLNL (feat. Yunhway, Giriboy) - ZERO%	Cho Jin-woong, Choi Woo-shik
194	January 8	Dongulsan Complex Market, Ulsan	You're My Manito	Sistar (feat. Giriboy) - Don't Be Such A Baby	Haha, Byul
194	January 8	Dongulsan Complex Market, Ulsan	You're My Manito	Consonants Quiz (Ramyeon Brands)	Haha, Byul
194	January 8	Dongulsan Complex Market, Ulsan	You're My Manito	AKMU - Re-Bye	Haha, Byul
195 (Note: Due to the broadcast of the South Korea's national soccer team warm-up match against Iceland, this episode aired early at 18:00 (KST).)	January 15	Mangwon Market, Seoul	Amazing Olympus	Paul Kim - Begin Again	Kang Hong-seok, Xiumin (EXO)
195	January 15	Mangwon Market, Seoul	Amazing Olympus	Find The Original Singer	Kang Hong-seok, Xiumin (EXO)
195	January 15	Mangwon Market, Seoul	Amazing Olympus	No Brain (feat. Tiger JK) - You Have a Crush on Me	Kang Hong-seok, Xiumin (EXO)
196	January 22	Gyesan Traditional Market, Incheon	Friends Who've Come To Play	Day6 - Blood	DinDin, Mijoo (Lovelyz)
196	January 22	Gyesan Traditional Market, Incheon	Friends Who've Come To Play	Voice Support Quiz (Variety Shows)	DinDin, Mijoo (Lovelyz)
196	January 22	Gyesan Traditional Market, Incheon	Friends Who've Come To Play	Djamilya Abdullaeva - Hate You, Honey	DinDin, Mijoo (Lovelyz)
197	January 29	Geojin Traditional Market, Goseong	Our Seollal	Tae Jin-ah (feat. Rain) - La Song	Jang Yoon-jeong, Lee Chan-won
197	January 29	Geojin Traditional Market, Goseong	Our Seollal	Noraebang Accompaniment Quiz (Trot Songs)	Jang Yoon-jeong, Lee Chan-won
197	January 29	Geojin Traditional Market, Goseong	Our Seollal	—N/a	Jang Yoon-jeong, Lee Chan-won
198	February 5	Ichon General Market, Seoul	Doctors	Rain - Gang	Uee, Son Na-eun (Apink)
198	February 5	Ichon General Market, Seoul	Doctors	Guess The Debut Song	Uee, Son Na-eun (Apink)
198	February 5	Ichon General Market, Seoul	Doctors	Celeb Five - I Wish I Could Unsee That (Rock Ver.)	Uee, Son Na-eun (Apink)
199	February 12	Hanmin Market, Daejeon	Amazing Freshman	Wonder Girls - G.N.O.	Chae Soo-bin, Kang Daniel
199	February 12	Hanmin Market, Daejeon	Amazing Freshman	Love Love Couple Quiz	Chae Soo-bin, Kang Daniel
199	February 12	Hanmin Market, Daejeon	Amazing Freshman	Shim Eun-jin - Oopsy	Chae Soo-bin, Kang Daniel
200 (Note: For the song dictation round, Park Na-rae fills in as MC while Boom becomes a playing cast for this episode.)	February 19	Janggye Market, Jangsu	Amazing 200th Episode - Something New Special	Jin (BTS) - Super Tuna (Note: This song is used for the special opening segment "Dictation Escape Room", where the cast must play Song Dictation individually to escape from their locked waiting rooms.) (Note: Escape order: Shin Dong-yup, Taeyeon, Moon Se-yoon, Key, Hanhae, Park Na-rae, P.O, Kim Dong-hyun, Nucksal.)	Oh My Girl (Hyojung, Mimi, YooA, Seunghee, Arin) (Note: Appeared only in the Snack Time segment.)
200	February 19	Janggye Market, Jangsu	Amazing 200th Episode - Something New Special	Oh My Girl (feat. Skull & Haha) - Listen to My Word (A-ing) (Note: As Nucksal finished last on the "Dictation Escape Room", he received food model instead of real food as punishment.)	Oh My Girl (Hyojung, Mimi, YooA, Seunghee, Arin)
200	February 19	Janggye Market, Jangsu	Amazing 200th Episode - Something New Special	Sing It Line by Line (Note: This is a group game between Team Oi (consists of all cast members except Key and Taeyeon) and Team A-ing (consists of Oh My Girl (except Jiho and Yubin), Key and Taeyeon).)	Oh My Girl (Hyojung, Mimi, YooA, Seunghee, Arin)
201	February 26	Gwangmyeong Traditional Market, Gwangmyeong	There Are No Bad Dogs in AS	Super Junior - Spy	Ahn Bo-hyun, Jo Bo-ah
201	February 26	Gwangmyeong Traditional Market, Gwangmyeong	There Are No Bad Dogs in AS	Consonants Quiz (Korean Fried Chicken Brands)	Ahn Bo-hyun, Jo Bo-ah
201	February 26	Gwangmyeong Traditional Market, Gwangmyeong	There Are No Bad Dogs in AS	Girl's Day - Top Girl	Ahn Bo-hyun, Jo Bo-ah
202	March 5	New Eungam Market, Seoul	Mama The Amazing	Orange Caramel - Funny Hunny	Kahi, Sunye
202	March 5	New Eungam Market, Seoul	Mama The Amazing	Choreography Décalcomanie Quiz	Kahi, Sunye
202	March 5	New Eungam Market, Seoul	Mama The Amazing	Jang Beom-june - I Will Make You Happy	Kahi, Sunye
203	March 12	Hogye Market, Anyang	Superior DoReMi	Solid - Like Likes Like	Ha Do-kwon, Jin Goo
203	March 12	Hogye Market, Anyang	Superior DoReMi	Lyrics Feeling Drama Quiz	Ha Do-kwon, Jin Goo
203	March 12	Hogye Market, Anyang	Superior DoReMi	Park Mi-kyung - Adam's Mind	Ha Do-kwon, Jin Goo
204	March 19	Central Market, Gangneung	Hip Hop VS Ballad	Giriboy, Kid Milli, NO:EL, Swings - Flex	Jay Park, Kyuhyun (Super Junior)
204	March 19	Central Market, Gangneung	Hip Hop VS Ballad	New/Old Neologism Quiz	Jay Park, Kyuhyun (Super Junior)
204	March 19	Central Market, Gangneung	Hip Hop VS Ballad	Baechigi - Turn a Deaf Ear (Note: The song in this round was originally supposed to be a ballad, but due to the cast solving the first round very quickly, the production team changed the song at the last minute to increase the difficulty.)	Jay Park, Kyuhyun (Super Junior)
205	March 26	Sangdo Traditional Market, Seoul	Highlight of My Life	Eru (feat. Ailee) - Highlight	Highlight (Yoon Doo-joon, Lee Gi-kwang, Son Dong-woon)
205	March 26	Sangdo Traditional Market, Seoul	Highlight of My Life	Music Video Scene Quiz	Highlight (Yoon Doo-joon, Lee Gi-kwang, Son Dong-woon)
205	March 26	Sangdo Traditional Market, Seoul	Highlight of My Life	2PM (feat. Yoon Eun-hye) - TikTok	Highlight (Yoon Doo-joon, Lee Gi-kwang, Son Dong-woon)
206	April 2	Moraenae Market, Jeonju	Shing Shing What Shing~? (Note: Korean word "싱")	Diva - That's What Happen When In Love	Ye Ji-won, Yoo Yeon-seok
206	April 2	Moraenae Market, Jeonju	Shing Shing What Shing~?	I Can See Your Title (Movies)	Ye Ji-won, Yoo Yeon-seok
206	April 2	Moraenae Market, Jeonju	Shing Shing What Shing~?	Sung Si-kyung - I Love U	Ye Ji-won, Yoo Yeon-seok
207 (Note: For this special episode, Small-mouthed Haetnim would join as part of the playing cast. In addition, in this episode, 2 cast members team up and work together in every segment. The teams are: Shin Dong-yup & Nucksal, Kim Dong-hyun & Taeyeon, Moon Se-yoon & Park Na-rae, Hanhae & P.O, and Key & Small-mouthed Haetnim) (Note: Special appearances via video by Ji Sang-ryeol, Seventeen (S.Coups, DK, Mingyu, Seungkwan) Jaejae, Jin Goo, Lee Yong-jin, Ravi (VIXX) and Hyeri (Girl's Day).)	April 9	Doremi Market, Wonju	4th Birthday - 1+1 Special	Badkiz - Ear Attack (Note: This song is used for the special opening segment "Dictation Escape Room"; however this time the cast (including Small-mouthed Haetnim) would be teamed up in pairs to play.) (Note: Escape order: Key & Small-mouthed Haetnim, Kim Dong-hyun & Taeyeon, Shin Dong-yup & Nucksal, Hanhae & P.O, Moon Se-yoon & Park Na-rae.)	Nado, Sini (Note: YouTubers, taking Small-mouthed Haetnim's place in eating the food when there's a failed attempt in song dictation.)
207	April 9	Doremi Market, Wonju	4th Birthday - 1+1 Special	Kim Won-jun - Bravo My Youth (Note: This song was requested by Jin Goo.)	Nado, Sini
207	April 9	Doremi Market, Wonju	4th Birthday - 1+1 Special	Noraebang Accompaniment Quiz	Nado, Sini
208	April 16	Hyunpung Hundred Years Goblin Market, Daegu	I Am P.O	Lee Chan-hyuk (AKMU) - Marine Triumph	Eun Ji-won (Sechs Kies), Kim Jong-min (Koyote)
208	April 16	Hyunpung Hundred Years Goblin Market, Daegu	I Am P.O	Consonants Quiz (Snack Brands)	Eun Ji-won (Sechs Kies), Kim Jong-min (Koyote)
208	April 16	Hyunpung Hundred Years Goblin Market, Daegu	I Am P.O	Pentagon - Very Good (Pentagon ver.)	Eun Ji-won (Sechs Kies), Kim Jong-min (Koyote)
209	April 23	Gumaetan Market, Suwon	Shopping Day	Turbo - Forbidden Game	Lee Kwang-soo, Seolhyun (AOA)
209	April 23	Gumaetan Market, Suwon	Shopping Day	New/Old OST Quiz (Dramas)	Lee Kwang-soo, Seolhyun (AOA)
209	April 23	Gumaetan Market, Suwon	Shopping Day	(G)I-dle - My Bag	Lee Kwang-soo, Seolhyun (AOA)
210	April 30	Neunggok Traditional Market, Goyang	Conditions of a Leader	Black Beat - Wing	Eunhyuk (Super Junior), Onew (SHINee), Suho (EXO)
210	April 30	Neunggok Traditional Market, Goyang	Conditions of a Leader	Who Are Today's 1st Place Nominees?	Eunhyuk (Super Junior), Onew (SHINee), Suho (EXO)
210	April 30	Neunggok Traditional Market, Goyang	Conditions of a Leader	Stella Jang (feat. Olltii) - Cheerleader	Eunhyuk (Super Junior), Onew (SHINee), Suho (EXO)
211	May 7	Gangnam Market, Bucheon	Kingry Saturday	Hyun Young - Draw Out	Joo Woo-jae, Joo Hyun-young, Meenoi
211	May 7	Gangnam Market, Bucheon	Kingry Saturday	Consonants Quiz (Variety Contents)	Joo Woo-jae, Joo Hyun-young, Meenoi
211	May 7	Gangnam Market, Bucheon	Kingry Saturday	Yoon Jong-shin - The Lobster	Joo Woo-jae, Joo Hyun-young, Meenoi
212	May 14	Haengdang Market, Seoul	A Hot Family Gathering	Baby V.O.X - To Men	Seventeen (DK, Mingyu, Seungkwan)
212	May 14	Haengdang Market, Seoul	A Hot Family Gathering	Lyrics in the Square Quiz	Seventeen (DK, Mingyu, Seungkwan)
212	May 14	Haengdang Market, Seoul	A Hot Family Gathering	Day6 - Dance Dance	Seventeen (DK, Mingyu, Seungkwan)
213	May 21	Changdong Alley Market, Seoul	All About Eve	Taesaja - Crunch	Park Byung-eun, Lee Sang-yeob
213	May 21	Changdong Alley Market, Seoul	All About Eve	Doppelganger Quiz (Actors/Actresses)	Park Byung-eun, Lee Sang-yeob
213	May 21	Changdong Alley Market, Seoul	All About Eve	Lovelyz - Memories	Park Byung-eun, Lee Sang-yeob
214	May 28	Gwanmun Market, Daegu	Spy Who've Come To Play	H.O.T. - Delight	Lee Hong-gi (F.T. Island), Lee Chang-sub (BtoB), Solar (Mamamoo)
214	May 28	Gwanmun Market, Daegu	Spy Who've Come To Play	Noraebang Accompaniment Quiz	Lee Hong-gi (F.T. Island), Lee Chang-sub (BtoB), Solar (Mamamoo)
214	May 28	Gwanmun Market, Daegu	Spy Who've Come To Play	Jaejoo Boys (feat. Hockee) - Secret Boy	Lee Hong-gi (F.T. Island), Lee Chang-sub (BtoB), Solar (Mamamoo)
215	June 4	Nambu Market, Anyang	Dom Dom What Dom (Note: Korean word "덤")	Oh My Girl - Guerilla	Hyolyn, WJSN (Bona, Exy)
215	June 4	Nambu Market, Anyang	Dom Dom What Dom	Lyrics Reading Quiz	Hyolyn, WJSN (Bona, Exy)
215	June 4	Nambu Market, Anyang	Dom Dom What Dom	Fin.K.L - Disregard	Hyolyn, WJSN (Bona, Exy)
216	June 11	Gugyeong Market, Danyang	Souls Who've Come To Play	Jannabi - Surprise!	Jung So-min, Hwang Min-hyun, Lee Jae-wook
216	June 11	Gugyeong Market, Danyang	Souls Who've Come To Play	Voice Support Quiz (Movies & Dramas)	Jung So-min, Hwang Min-hyun, Lee Jae-wook
216	June 11	Gugyeong Market, Danyang	Souls Who've Come To Play	Shinhwa - Sharing Forever	Jung So-min, Hwang Min-hyun, Lee Jae-wook
217	June 18	Hwagok Bondong Market, Seoul	Eccentric Friends	Gavengers - You Laugh, You're Lucky Yo!	Jo Hye-ryun, Nam Chang-hee, Choi Yoo-jung (Weki Meki)
217	June 18	Hwagok Bondong Market, Seoul	Eccentric Friends	Consonants Quiz (Ice Cream Brands)	Jo Hye-ryun, Nam Chang-hee, Choi Yoo-jung (Weki Meki)
217	June 18	Hwagok Bondong Market, Seoul	Eccentric Friends	Kim Se-jeong - Do Dum Chit	Jo Hye-ryun, Nam Chang-hee, Choi Yoo-jung (Weki Meki)
218 (Note: Special appearance by Chris Hemsworth as a special correspondent via VCR.)	June 25	Jinbu Traditional Market, Pyeongchang	If It's Pop, It's Pop	Hyolyn - Bae	Twice (Nayeon, Momo, Chaeyoung)
218	June 25	Jinbu Traditional Market, Pyeongchang	If It's Pop, It's Pop	Lyrics in the Square Quiz	Twice (Nayeon, Momo, Chaeyoung)
218	June 25	Jinbu Traditional Market, Pyeongchang	If It's Pop, It's Pop	f(x) - Vacance	Twice (Nayeon, Momo, Chaeyoung)
219	July 2	Guro Market, Seoul	Funny Couple	Hyuna - Babe	Kim Jun-ho, Kim Ji-min
219	July 2	Guro Market, Seoul	Funny Couple	Voice Support Quiz (Comedy Famous Lines)	Kim Jun-ho, Kim Ji-min
219	July 2	Guro Market, Seoul	Funny Couple	Park Hyo-shin (feat. As One) - Feel... Me.!	Kim Jun-ho, Kim Ji-min
220	July 9	Gupo Market, Busan	Return of The Festival	AKMU (with Beenzino) - Tictoc Tictoc Tictoc	Heize, Chungha
220	July 9	Gupo Market, Busan	Return of The Festival	Music Video Scene Quiz	Heize, Chungha
220	July 9	Gupo Market, Busan	Return of The Festival	Changmo - Wish	Heize, Chungha
221	July 16	Gwonseon General Market, Suwon	Amazing Mate	Wonder Girls (feat. San E) - Act Cool	Itzy (Yeji, Chaeryeong, Yuna)
221	July 16	Gwonseon General Market, Suwon	Amazing Mate	Sub Title Quiz (Songs)	Itzy (Yeji, Chaeryeong, Yuna)
221	July 16	Gwonseon General Market, Suwon	Amazing Mate	Billlie - GingaMingaYo (the strange world)	Itzy (Yeji, Chaeryeong, Yuna)
222	July 23	Yangdong Market, Gwangju	Heat Escape Number One	T.J - Hey Girl	Heo Sung-tae, Lee Soo-kyung
222	July 23	Yangdong Market, Gwangju	Heat Escape Number One	New/Old Neologism Quiz	Heo Sung-tae, Lee Soo-kyung
222	July 23	Yangdong Market, Gwangju	Heat Escape Number One	sogumm - So Fast	Heo Sung-tae, Lee Soo-kyung
223	July 30	Jangtteul Market, Jeungpyeong	Summer Special #1 - Earth Hipsters	(G)I-dle - Dumdi Dumdi	Lee Eun-ji, Zico (Block B), Bibi, An Yu-jin (Ive)
223	July 30	Jangtteul Market, Jeungpyeong	Summer Special #1 - Earth Hipsters	Director Quiz; Noraebang Accompaniment Quiz	Lee Eun-ji, Zico (Block B), Bibi, An Yu-jin (Ive)
224	August 6	Jeongseojin Jungang Market, Incheon	Summer Special #2 - Girls and Ocean	DJ DOC - Let's Go to the Beach (Note: The song dictation is played as a team match between the DoReMi Team and the Girls' Generation Team. Both teams succeeded on their 3rd attempts, resulting in a tie.)	Girls' Generation
224	August 6	Jeongseojin Jungang Market, Incheon	Summer Special #2 - Girls and Ocean	Director Quiz; Noraebang Accompaniment Quiz	Girls' Generation
225	August 13	Jayang Traditional Market, Seoul	Lucky Saturday	g.o.d - 21C Our Hope	Eum Moon-suk, Ko Kyung-pyo
225	August 13	Jayang Traditional Market, Seoul	Lucky Saturday	Consonants Quiz (Ramyeon Brands)	Eum Moon-suk, Ko Kyung-pyo
225	August 13	Jayang Traditional Market, Seoul	Lucky Saturday	Viviz - Bop Bop!	Eum Moon-suk, Ko Kyung-pyo
226	August 20	Moran Traditional Market, Seongnam	Ve Ve What Ve? (Note: Korean word "브")	Pengsoo (feat. Tiger JK, Bizzy, Bibi) - This Is Pengsoo	Ive (An Yu-jin, Rei, Leeseo)
226	August 20	Moran Traditional Market, Seongnam	Ve Ve What Ve?	Lyrics in the Square Quiz	Ive (An Yu-jin, Rei, Leeseo)
226	August 20	Moran Traditional Market, Seongnam	Ve Ve What Ve?	Monsta X - Livin' It Up (Korean ver.)	Ive (An Yu-jin, Rei, Leeseo)
227	August 27	Kyeongan Market, Gwangju	Amazing Generation X	Psy - Bird	Kwon Sang-woo, Park Jin-joo
227	August 27	Kyeongan Market, Gwangju	Amazing Generation X	Doppelganger Quiz (Actors/Actresses)	Kwon Sang-woo, Park Jin-joo
227	August 27	Kyeongan Market, Gwangju	Amazing Generation X	Jay Park - Bite	Kwon Sang-woo, Park Jin-joo
228	September 3	Seongdong Market, Gyeongju	Sa Sa What Sa? (Note: Korean word "사")	SG Wannabe - Crime and Punishment Part II	Ha Seok-jin, Taecyeon (2PM), Lee Eun-ji (Note: Standing in for Park Na-rae)
228	September 3	Seongdong Market, Gyeongju	Sa Sa What Sa?	Music Video Scene Quiz	Ha Seok-jin, Taecyeon (2PM), Lee Eun-ji
228	September 3	Seongdong Market, Gyeongju	Sa Sa What Sa?	Super Junior - Mr. Simple	Ha Seok-jin, Taecyeon (2PM), Lee Eun-ji
229	September 10	Sammi Market, Siheung	A Family in Hangawi	BTS - Where You From	Cho Jun-ho, Cho Jun-hyun, Jonathan Yiombi, Patricia Yiombi
229	September 10	Sammi Market, Siheung	A Family in Hangawi	Noraebang Accompaniment Quiz	Cho Jun-ho, Cho Jun-hyun, Jonathan Yiombi, Patricia Yiombi
229	September 10	Sammi Market, Siheung	A Family in Hangawi	BTS - Where You From	Cho Jun-ho, Cho Jun-hyun, Jonathan Yiombi, Patricia Yiombi
230	September 17	Doma Big Market, Daejeon	AS Class President Election	Kim Wan-sun - That's You	Ra Mi-ran, Yoon Kyung-ho, Kim Mu-yeol
230	September 17	Doma Big Market, Daejeon	AS Class President Election	I Can See Your Title (Korean Movies)	Ra Mi-ran, Yoon Kyung-ho, Kim Mu-yeol
230	September 17	Doma Big Market, Daejeon	AS Class President Election	Oh My Girl - Liar Liar	Ra Mi-ran, Yoon Kyung-ho, Kim Mu-yeol
231	September 24	Deokpung Traditional Market, Hanam	Busy It's Busy, Rush Hour	Zico (Block B) - Seoul Drift	Giriboy, Crush
231	September 24	Deokpung Traditional Market, Hanam	Busy It's Busy, Rush Hour	Consonants Quiz (Hamburger)	Giriboy, Crush
231	September 24	Deokpung Traditional Market, Hanam	Busy It's Busy, Rush Hour	Lee Seung-hwan - I Am	Giriboy, Crush
232	October 1	Mok Sarang Market, Seoul	Exciting Saturday	Chakra - Come A Come	Kim Ho-young, Gabee
232	October 1	Mok Sarang Market, Seoul	Exciting Saturday	Lyrics Feeling Drama Quiz	Kim Ho-young, Gabee
232	October 1	Mok Sarang Market, Seoul	Exciting Saturday	T-ara - Number 9	Kim Ho-young, Gabee
233	October 8	Sanbon Traditional Market, Gunpo	I Am Solo	Wendy (Red Velvet) - If I Could Read Your Mind	Ailee, Seulgi (Red Velvet), Chuu (Loona)
233	October 8	Sanbon Traditional Market, Gunpo	I Am Solo	Guess The First Winning Song	Ailee, Seulgi (Red Velvet), Chuu (Loona)
233	October 8	Sanbon Traditional Market, Gunpo	I Am Solo	Jamie (feat. Kino (Pentagon), Woodz, Nathan) - PUTP	Ailee, Seulgi (Red Velvet), Chuu (Loona)
234	October 15	Yongsang Market, Andong	20th Century DoReMi	Girl's Day - Thirsty	Byeon Woo-seok, Kim You-jung
234	October 15	Yongsang Market, Andong	20th Century DoReMi	New/Old OST Quiz (Dramas)	Byeon Woo-seok, Kim You-jung
234	October 15	Yongsang Market, Andong	20th Century DoReMi	NCT 127 - Fire Truck	Byeon Woo-seok, Kim You-jung
235	October 22	Sinjeong Market, Ulsan	Le Le What Le? (Note: Korean word "르")	Simon Dominic - Party Forever	Le Sserafim (Sakura, Kim Chae-won, Huh Yunjin)
235	October 22	Sinjeong Market, Ulsan	Le Le What Le?	Consonants Quiz (Songs)	Le Sserafim (Sakura, Kim Chae-won, Huh Yunjin)
235	October 22	Sinjeong Market, Ulsan	Le Le What Le?	Cherry Filter - Madonna of Combat	Le Sserafim (Sakura, Kim Chae-won, Huh Yunjin)
236	October 29	Central Market, Seoul	Musical Genius Who've Come To Play	Psy (feat. Suga (BTS)) - That That	Kim Yong-myung, Lee Chan-hyuk (AKMU)
236	October 29	Central Market, Seoul	Musical Genius Who've Come To Play	Find The Source of This Meme	Kim Yong-myung, Lee Chan-hyuk (AKMU)
236	October 29	Central Market, Seoul	Musical Genius Who've Come To Play	Be'O - LOVE me	Kim Yong-myung, Lee Chan-hyuk (AKMU)
237	November 12	Saemaeul Market, Gwangmyeong	Go Go Time Travel	Key (SHINee) - Delight	Yeo Jin-goo, Cho Yi-hyun, Kim Hye-yoon, Na In-woo
237	November 12	Saemaeul Market, Gwangmyeong	Go Go Time Travel	Voice Support Quiz (Dramas, Movies)	Yeo Jin-goo, Cho Yi-hyun, Kim Hye-yoon, Na In-woo
237	November 12	Saemaeul Market, Gwangmyeong	Go Go Time Travel	Lee Mu-jin - Astronaut	Yeo Jin-goo, Cho Yi-hyun, Kim Hye-yoon, Na In-woo
238	November 19	Kkachisan Market, Seoul	AS Is Self	X4 - Present	Oh My Girl (Hyojung, Mimi, YooA)
238	November 19	Kkachisan Market, Seoul	AS Is Self	Lyrics in the Square Quiz	Oh My Girl (Hyojung, Mimi, YooA)
238	November 19	Kkachisan Market, Seoul	AS Is Self	Lee Young-ji (feat. Jay Park) - Day & Night	Oh My Girl (Hyojung, Mimi, YooA)
239	November 26	Soraepogu General Fish Market, Incheon	AS Autumn Music Festival	Peppertones - Tangerine	Jung Jae-hyung, Jukjae, Jung Seung-hwan
239	November 26	Soraepogu General Fish Market, Incheon	AS Autumn Music Festival	Find The Original Singer	Jung Jae-hyung, Jukjae, Jung Seung-hwan
239	November 26	Soraepogu General Fish Market, Incheon	AS Autumn Music Festival	Park Hyo-shin (feat. Kim Bum-soo) - Just Friends	Jung Jae-hyung, Jukjae, Jung Seung-hwan
240	December 3	Folk Flea Market, Seoul	Amazing Trio	Moogadang - Unstoppable High Kick	Kim Won-hoon, Cho Jin-se, Eom Ji-yoon
240	December 3	Folk Flea Market, Seoul	Amazing Trio	Guess The Alter Ego	Kim Won-hoon, Cho Jin-se, Eom Ji-yoon
240	December 3	Folk Flea Market, Seoul	Amazing Trio	Implanted Kid - Soldier's DM	Kim Won-hoon, Cho Jin-se, Eom Ji-yoon
241 (Note: Special appearances by Sam Worthington and Zoe Saldaña as special correspondents via VCR.)	December 10	Seonghwan Ihwa Market, Cheonan	City Men & Women Who've Come To Play	Girls' Generation-TTS - OMG	Han Sun-hwa, Jung Eun-ji (Apink), Lee Sun-bin, Sunny (Girls' Generation) (Note: Standing in for Taeyeon)
241	December 10	Seonghwan Ihwa Market, Cheonan	City Men & Women Who've Come To Play	New/Old OST Quiz (Dramas, Movies)	Han Sun-hwa, Jung Eun-ji (Apink), Lee Sun-bin, Sunny (Girls' Generation)
241	December 10	Seonghwan Ihwa Market, Cheonan	City Men & Women Who've Come To Play	Hwayobi - Don't Take My Call	Han Sun-hwa, Jung Eun-ji (Apink), Lee Sun-bin, Sunny (Girls' Generation)
242	December 17	Jatgoeul Market, Gapyeong	I Am Saturday Singer	Blackpink - Kill This Love	Kim Bum-soo, KCM, Sunny (Girls' Generation), Minho (SHINee) (Note: Standing in for Key)
242	December 17	Jatgoeul Market, Gapyeong	I Am Saturday Singer	Lyrics Reading Quiz	Kim Bum-soo, KCM, Sunny (Girls' Generation), Minho (SHINee)
242	December 17	Jatgoeul Market, Gapyeong	I Am Saturday Singer	Day6 - So Cool	Kim Bum-soo, KCM, Sunny (Girls' Generation), Minho (SHINee)
243	December 24	Yeongdeungpo Traditional Market, Seoul	AS on Christmas	Stray Kids - Christmas EveL	Kim Tae-woo (g.o.d), Tei
243	December 24	Yeongdeungpo Traditional Market, Seoul	AS on Christmas	Noraebang Accompaniment Quiz	Kim Tae-woo (g.o.d), Tei
243	December 24	Yeongdeungpo Traditional Market, Seoul	AS on Christmas	Younha - Oort Cloud	Kim Tae-woo (g.o.d), Tei
244	December 31	Wongogae Market, Daegu	Year-End Special - 2022, A Year Passes By	BTS - Airplane Pt. 2 (Note: The song dictation is played as a relay with 3 teams and instead of the usual three attempts, each team has six attempts. Each team must note down the part of the lyrics that are separated into three lines and the first team that answered their part correctly gets to eat first.) (Note: Team Key (Key, Shin Dong-yup, Taeyeon, Yuqi) must guess the first line, Team Se (Moon Se-yoon, Kim Dong-hyun, Park Na-rae, Miyeon, Shuhua) must guess the second line, and Team Han (Hanhae, Nucksal, Minnie, Soyeon) must guess the third line. Team Key succeeded on their third attempt, and both Team Se & Team Han succeeded at their fifth attempts.)	(G)I-dle
244	December 31	Wongogae Market, Daegu	Year-End Special - 2022, A Year Passes By	Lyrics in the Square Quiz; Consonants Quiz (2000–2022 Songs); Choreography Décalcomanie Quiz; Who Are Today's 1st Place Nominees?	(G)I-dle

== Episodes (2023) ==
List of episodes in 2023 (episode 245-296)

Ep.	Air Date	Featured Market	Dressing Theme Concept	Song Questions + Snack Time Game	Guest(s)
245 (Note: Special appearance by Nam Hyun-seung as a special correspondent via VCR.)	January 7	Singok Market, Seoul	New Year Special - 2023, Let's Laugh in the New Year	Deux - We Are (Note: Team Taeng (Taeyeon, Park Na-rae, Hanhae, Kim Hae-jun, Lee Eun-ji) must guess the first line, Team Yup (Shin Dong-yup, Moon Se-yoon, Kim Doo-young, Lee Sang-jun) must guess the second line, and Team Dong (Kim Dong-hyun, Nucksal, Key, Lee Guk-joo) must guess the third line. Both Team Yup & Team Dong succeeded on their fourth attempts. As Team Taeng did not succeed at the attempt, no food would be provided to Team Taeng.)	Kim Doo-young, Lee Sang-jun, Lee Guk-joo, Kim Hae-jun, Lee Eun-ji
245	January 7	Singok Market, Seoul	New Year Special - 2023, Let's Laugh in the New Year	Half-half Lyrics Quiz	Kim Doo-young, Lee Sang-jun, Lee Guk-joo, Kim Hae-jun, Lee Eun-ji
246	January 14	Namhansanseong Market, Seongnam	Limitless Saturday	Seventeen BSS - Just Do It	Kim Min-kyung, Pungja
246	January 14	Namhansanseong Market, Seongnam	Limitless Saturday	Consonants Quiz (Ramyeon Brands)	Kim Min-kyung, Pungja
246	January 14	Namhansanseong Market, Seongnam	Limitless Saturday	Lim Jeong-hee (feat. Hyuna) - Golden Lady	Kim Min-kyung, Pungja
247	January 21	Yeongdong Traditional Market, Seoul	Kokdu New Year Has Come	Pentagon - Sha La La	Cha Chung-hwa, Im Soo-hyang
247	January 21	Yeongdong Traditional Market, Seoul	Kokdu New Year Has Come	Lyrics Feeling Drama Quiz	Cha Chung-hwa, Im Soo-hyang
247	January 21	Yeongdong Traditional Market, Seoul	Kokdu New Year Has Come	Davichi (feat. Baek Chan) - Don't Leave	Cha Chung-hwa, Im Soo-hyang
248	January 28	Gwangjang Market, Seoul	AS Phantom Squad	Solar (Mamamoo) - Honey	Lee Hanee, Park So-dam
248	January 28	Gwangjang Market, Seoul	AS Phantom Squad	Doppelganger Quiz (Actors/Actresses)	Lee Hanee, Park So-dam
248	January 28	Gwangjang Market, Seoul	AS Phantom Squad	Rain - Superman	Lee Hanee, Park So-dam
249	February 4	Nambu Market, Wonju	Dol Dol What Dol? (Note: Korean word "돌")	Sharp - My Lips... Like Warm Coffee	Lee Jang-woo, Go Bo-gyeol, Kim Min-kyu
249	February 4	Nambu Market, Wonju	Dol Dol What Dol?	New/Old Neologism Quiz	Lee Jang-woo, Go Bo-gyeol, Kim Min-kyu
249	February 4	Nambu Market, Wonju	Dol Dol What Dol?	WJSN - As You Wish	Lee Jang-woo, Go Bo-gyeol, Kim Min-kyu
250	February 11	Dapsimni Modern Market, Seoul	AS Battle	Hamohamo - Papillon	Teo Yoo, Kim Ji-hoon, Kim Ok-vin
250	February 11	Dapsimni Modern Market, Seoul	AS Battle	I Can See Your Title (Movies)	Teo Yoo, Kim Ji-hoon, Kim Ok-vin
250	February 11	Dapsimni Modern Market, Seoul	AS Battle	Kai (EXO) - Reason	Teo Yoo, Kim Ji-hoon, Kim Ok-vin
251	February 18	Ulsan Traditional Market, Ulsan	Vengeful Saturday	Taeyang (BigBang) (feat. Jimin (BTS)) - Vibe	Kim Young-kwang, Lee Sung-kyung
251	February 18	Ulsan Traditional Market, Ulsan	Vengeful Saturday	Guess Them Right! Homes	Kim Young-kwang, Lee Sung-kyung
251	February 18	Ulsan Traditional Market, Ulsan	Vengeful Saturday	Kara - Burn	Kim Young-kwang, Lee Sung-kyung
252	February 25	Junggok Jeil Market, Seoul	Puppy Saturday	T.J - Hyuk's Love Story	Cha Tae-hyun, Yoo Yeon-seok
252	February 25	Junggok Jeil Market, Seoul	Puppy Saturday	Voice Support Quiz (Dramas, Movies)	Cha Tae-hyun, Yoo Yeon-seok
252	February 25	Junggok Jeil Market, Seoul	Puppy Saturday	Onewe - Love Me	Cha Tae-hyun, Yoo Yeon-seok
253	March 4	Jungdong Sarang Market, Bucheon	Walking Statue Day	Hiroki & Tanaka - Cool	Jung Hyuk, Hwang Min-hyun, Juyeon (The Boyz)
253	March 4	Jungdong Sarang Market, Bucheon	Walking Statue Day	Lyrics in the Square Quiz	Jung Hyuk, Hwang Min-hyun, Juyeon (The Boyz)
253	March 4	Jungdong Sarang Market, Bucheon	Walking Statue Day	Monsta X - Hero	Jung Hyuk, Hwang Min-hyun, Juyeon (The Boyz)
254	March 11	Gyeongdong Market, Seoul	Freely Saturday	Blackpink - Forever Young	Twice (Jeongyeon, Jihyo, Dahyun), Hwang Kwang-hee (ZE:A)
254	March 11	Gyeongdong Market, Seoul	Freely Saturday	Music Video Scene Quiz	Twice (Jeongyeon, Jihyo, Dahyun), Hwang Kwang-hee (ZE:A)
254	March 11	Gyeongdong Market, Seoul	Freely Saturday	Seventeen BSS (feat. Lee Young-ji) - Fighting	Twice (Jeongyeon, Jihyo, Dahyun), Hwang Kwang-hee (ZE:A)
255	March 18	Hyeonggok Central Market, Gumi	Something Happened in Hotel	1TYM - Do You Know Me?	Hwang Je-sung, Monika, Layone
255	March 18	Hyeonggok Central Market, Gumi	Something Happened in Hotel	Noraebang Accompaniment Quiz	Hwang Je-sung, Monika, Layone
255	March 18	Hyeonggok Central Market, Gumi	Something Happened in Hotel	MC Jooji (feat. Chin Chilla, Jiselle) - Swag	Hwang Je-sung, Monika, Layone
256	March 25	Pungnap Traditional Market, Seoul	AS Fashion Week	Winner - Dress Up	Code Kunst, Kai (EXO)
256	March 25	Pungnap Traditional Market, Seoul	AS Fashion Week	Lyrics in the Square Quiz	Code Kunst, Kai (EXO)
256	March 25	Pungnap Traditional Market, Seoul	AS Fashion Week	Goofy - Sleeping Child of Winter	Code Kunst, Kai (EXO)
257	April 1	Millak Alley Market, Busan	Amazing Experts	G-Dragon (BigBang) (feat. Flo Rida) - Heartbreaker	Defconn, Heo Young-ji (Kara), BamBam (Got7)
257	April 1	Millak Alley Market, Busan	Amazing Experts	Voice Support Quiz (Variety Shows)	Defconn, Heo Young-ji (Kara), BamBam (Got7)
257	April 1	Millak Alley Market, Busan	Amazing Experts	Diva - Lust In The Wind	Defconn, Heo Young-ji (Kara), BamBam (Got7)
258	April 8	Mullae Artist Village, Seoul	5th Anniversary Special - Amazing 5aturday	TXT - New Rules (Note: Team Maknae (Shin Dong-yup, Kim Dong-hyun, Rei, Leeseo) must guess the first line, Team Unnie (Moon Se-yoon, Park Na-rae, Key, Gaeul, An Yu-jin) must guess the second line, and Team Same Age (Nucksal, Hanhae, Taeyeon, Jang Won-young, Liz) must guess the third line. Team Unnie succeeded on their second attempt, and both Team Maknae & Team Same Age succeeded on their third attempts.)	Ive
258	April 8	Mullae Artist Village, Seoul	5th Anniversary Special - Amazing 5aturday	Noraebang Accompaniment Quiz	Ive
259	April 15	Huam Traditional Market, Seoul	It's A Long Saturday	Park Ji-yoon - Steal Away	Lee Hyun-yi, Lee Guk-joo, Song Hae-na
259	April 15	Huam Traditional Market, Seoul	It's A Long Saturday	Consonants Quiz (Songs)	Lee Hyun-yi, Lee Guk-joo, Song Hae-na
259	April 15	Huam Traditional Market, Seoul	It's A Long Saturday	BESTie - Pit-a-pat	Lee Hyun-yi, Lee Guk-joo, Song Hae-na
260 (Note: Special appearance by Jack Black as a special correspondent via VCR.)	April 22	Gildong Bokjori Market, Seoul	Secret Agent Number One	g.o.d - I Don't Know About Love	Jang Hyuk, Chae Jung-an, Jang Na-ra
260	April 22	Gildong Bokjori Market, Seoul	Secret Agent Number One	Music Video Scene Quiz	Jang Hyuk, Chae Jung-an, Jang Na-ra
260	April 22	Gildong Bokjori Market, Seoul	Secret Agent Number One	Nmixx - Love Me Like This	Jang Hyuk, Chae Jung-an, Jang Na-ra
261	April 29	Bupyeong Kkang Market, Incheon	Gather Up! AS Family	Turbo - Only Seventeen (Note: The song dictation is played as a team match between Team DoReMi and the Team Seventeen. Team DoReMi succeeded on their third attempt, while Team Seventeen failed.)	Seventeen (S.Coups, DK, Mingyu, The8, Seungkwan, Vernon, Dino)
261	April 29	Bupyeong Kkang Market, Incheon	Gather Up! AS Family	Consonants Quiz (Ramyeon Brands); Lyrics in the Square Quiz	Seventeen (S.Coups, DK, Mingyu, The8, Seungkwan, Vernon, Dino)
262	May 6	Hyoja Market, Pohang	AS Tale	Cool - Waiting	Kim So-yeon, Lee Dong-wook, Kim Bum
262	May 6	Hyoja Market, Pohang	AS Tale	Lyrics Feeling Drama Quiz	Kim So-yeon, Lee Dong-wook, Kim Bum
262	May 6	Hyoja Market, Pohang	AS Tale	Defconn (feat. Minah (Girl's Day)) - Rapper's Breakup Part 2	Kim So-yeon, Lee Dong-wook, Kim Bum
263	May 13	Songhwa Byeokhwa Market, Seoul	May is a Festival	K.Will (feat. Choiza (Dynamic Duo)) - Hey You	Jo Hyun-ah (Urban Zakapa), Mijoo (Lovelyz), Kwon Jin-ah
263	May 13	Songhwa Byeokhwa Market, Seoul	May is a Festival	Guess The Debut Song	Jo Hyun-ah (Urban Zakapa), Mijoo (Lovelyz), Kwon Jin-ah
263	May 13	Songhwa Byeokhwa Market, Seoul	May is a Festival	Seventeen, Ailee - Q&A	Jo Hyun-ah (Urban Zakapa), Mijoo (Lovelyz), Kwon Jin-ah
264	May 20	Daemyeong Glow Light Street Market, Seoul	Amazing Office Workers	Super Junior - Sorry Sorry - Answer	U-Know Yunho (TVXQ), Lee Yeon-hee, Hong Jong-hyun
264	May 20	Daemyeong Glow Light Street Market, Seoul	Amazing Office Workers	Guess The Debut Act (Dramas)	U-Know Yunho (TVXQ), Lee Yeon-hee, Hong Jong-hyun
264	May 20	Daemyeong Glow Light Street Market, Seoul	Amazing Office Workers	NRG - Making Love	U-Know Yunho (TVXQ), Lee Yeon-hee, Hong Jong-hyun
265	May 27	Dongducheon Keun Market, Dongducheon	Y2K Saturday	Soyeon ((G)I-dle) (feat. Bibi, Lee Young-ji) - Is This Bad B****** Number?	(G)I-dle (Miyeon, Minnie, Yuqi)
265	May 27	Dongducheon Keun Market, Dongducheon	Y2K Saturday	Consonants Quiz (Ice Cream Brands)	(G)I-dle (Miyeon, Minnie, Yuqi)
265	May 27	Dongducheon Keun Market, Dongducheon	Y2K Saturday	Stray Kids - Get Cool	(G)I-dle (Miyeon, Minnie, Yuqi)
266	June 3	Mapo Gongdeok Market, Seoul	Villain City	Clon - I	Kim Min-jae, Ko Kyu-pil, Lee Joon-hyuk
266	June 3	Mapo Gongdeok Market, Seoul	Villain City	I Can See Your Title (Korean Movies & Dramas)	Kim Min-jae, Ko Kyu-pil, Lee Joon-hyuk
266	June 3	Mapo Gongdeok Market, Seoul	Villain City	Chungha - Bad Boy	Kim Min-jae, Ko Kyu-pil, Lee Joon-hyuk
267	June 10	Gyodong Market, Daegu	Be My Friend!	Yang Dong-geun (feat. Tiger JK) - Run	Park Joon-myun, Rhymer, Gree
267	June 10	Gyodong Market, Daegu	Be My Friend!	Noraebang Accompaniment Quiz	Park Joon-myun, Rhymer, Gree
267	June 10	Gyodong Market, Daegu	Be My Friend!	Min Hae-kyung - I Got to See You Again	Park Joon-myun, Rhymer, Gree
268	June 17	Bakdal Market, Anyang	Where Would You Like to Go on Saturday?	Girls' Generation-TTS - Checkmate	Kim Nam-hee, Park Ha-sun, Dahyun (Twice)
268	June 17	Bakdal Market, Anyang	Where Would You Like to Go on Saturday?	Voice Support Quiz (Korean Movies & Dramas)	Kim Nam-hee, Park Ha-sun, Dahyun (Twice)
268	June 17	Bakdal Market, Anyang	Where Would You Like to Go on Saturday?	S.E.S. - Rock'N Country	Kim Nam-hee, Park Ha-sun, Dahyun (Twice)
269	June 24	Gobundari Traditional Market, Seoul	The Reason Why Opposites Attract	Girl's Day - Oh, Great!	Kim Dong-wook, Chun Woo-hee, Dahyun (Twice)
269	June 24	Gobundari Traditional Market, Seoul	The Reason Why Opposites Attract	Consonants Quiz (Korean Movies)	Kim Dong-wook, Chun Woo-hee, Dahyun (Twice)
269	June 24	Gobundari Traditional Market, Seoul	The Reason Why Opposites Attract	B1A4 - What's Happening?	Kim Dong-wook, Chun Woo-hee, Dahyun (Twice)
270	July 1	Mangwon World Cup Market, Seoul	Hard Saturday	G-Dragon (BigBang) (feat. Missy Elliott) - Niliria	Shinee (Minho, Taemin), Lee Guk-joo
270	July 1	Mangwon World Cup Market, Seoul	Hard Saturday	Interlude Jump Quiz	Shinee (Minho, Taemin), Lee Guk-joo
270	July 1	Mangwon World Cup Market, Seoul	Hard Saturday	Seventeen - Hot	Shinee (Minho, Taemin), Lee Guk-joo
271	July 8	Seojeongri Traditional Market, Pyeongtaek	Into the World in Amazement	ONF - Trip Advisor	Yoo Yeon-seok, Kyuhyun (Super Junior), Lee Guk-joo
271	July 8	Seojeongri Traditional Market, Pyeongtaek	Into the World in Amazement	Find The Original Singer	Yoo Yeon-seok, Kyuhyun (Super Junior), Lee Guk-joo
271	July 8	Seojeongri Traditional Market, Pyeongtaek	Into the World in Amazement	Super Junior-T - Don't Go Away	Yoo Yeon-seok, Kyuhyun (Super Junior), Lee Guk-joo
272	July 15	Sinwon Market, Seoul	01 (Forever) AS	BTS - Friends	Zerobaseone (Note: Only Kim Ji-woong, Sung Han-bin, and Seok Matthew have participated in the Song Dictation segment. The remaining members would subsequently appear in the Snack Time segment.)
272	July 15	Sinwon Market, Seoul	01 (Forever) AS	New/Old Neologism Quiz; Lyrics in the Square Quiz	Zerobaseone
273	July 22	Jayou Market, Mokpo	AS 70's	Suh Soo-nam & Ha Chung-il - A Stingy Life	Yum Jung-ah, Park Jeong-min, Go Min-si
273	July 22	Jayou Market, Mokpo	AS 70's	Guess Them Right! Homes	Yum Jung-ah, Park Jeong-min, Go Min-si
273	July 22	Jayou Market, Mokpo	AS 70's	Paul Kim (feat. Big Naughty) - Hangang	Yum Jung-ah, Park Jeong-min, Go Min-si
274	July 29	Dogok Market, Seoul	Scary Saturday	EXID - Up & Down	DinDin, Dex, Tsuki (Billlie)
274	July 29	Dogok Market, Seoul	Scary Saturday	Find The Source of This Meme	DinDin, Dex, Tsuki (Billlie)
274	July 29	Dogok Market, Seoul	Scary Saturday	Jamie (feat. Changmo) - Numbers	DinDin, Dex, Tsuki (Billlie)
275	August 5	Shingi Market, Incheon	Oh My Summer	T-ara - Yayaya	Oh My Girl (Mimi, Seunghee, Arin)
275	August 5	Shingi Market, Incheon	Oh My Summer	Consonants Quiz (Snack Brands)	Oh My Girl (Mimi, Seunghee, Arin)
275	August 5	Shingi Market, Incheon	Oh My Summer	Bewhy - Incheon Airport Freestyle	Oh My Girl (Mimi, Seunghee, Arin)
276	August 12	Yeonseo Market, Seoul	Windy Saturday	Co-Ed School - Bbiribbom Bberibbom	Koyote
276	August 12	Yeonseo Market, Seoul	Windy Saturday	Who Are Today's 1st Place Nominees?	Koyote
276	August 12	Yeonseo Market, Seoul	Windy Saturday	Kim Won-jun - Every Day	Koyote
277	August 19	Jeonpo Playground Market, Busan	Energetic Saturday	Ive - Lips	Solar (Mamamoo), Kwon Eun-bi, RalRal
277	August 19	Jeonpo Playground Market, Busan	Energetic Saturday	Lyrics in the Square Quiz	Solar (Mamamoo), Kwon Eun-bi, RalRal
277	August 19	Jeonpo Playground Market, Busan	Energetic Saturday	Dal Shabet - Someone Like U	Solar (Mamamoo), Kwon Eun-bi, RalRal
278	August 26	Mokdong Kkabi Market, Seoul	Come to Play Duo	Nuclear - Tell Me What You Want	Dynamic Duo, Mimi (Oh My Girl)
278	August 26	Mokdong Kkabi Market, Seoul	Come to Play Duo	Consonants Quiz (Korean Fried Chicken Brands)	Dynamic Duo, Mimi (Oh My Girl)
278	August 26	Mokdong Kkabi Market, Seoul	Come to Play Duo	Meenoi - Dool	Dynamic Duo, Mimi (Oh My Girl)
279	September 2	Muan Traditional Market, South Jeolla	Bouncy Saturday	Space A - Sexy Man	Shin Gi-ru, Lee Guk-joo, Pungja, Hyoyeon (Girls' Generation)
279	September 2	Muan Traditional Market, South Jeolla	Bouncy Saturday	Voice Support Quiz (Variety Shows)	Shin Gi-ru, Lee Guk-joo, Pungja, Hyoyeon (Girls' Generation)
279	September 2	Muan Traditional Market, South Jeolla	Bouncy Saturday	Dynamic Duo (feat. Penomeco) - MSG	Shin Gi-ru, Lee Guk-joo, Pungja, Hyoyeon (Girls' Generation)
280	September 9	Kumho Happiness Market, Seongnam	Age Age Same Age	Turbo - My Diary	Bbaek Ga (Koyote), Jeon Somi, Jeong Dong-won
280	September 9	Kumho Happiness Market, Seongnam	Age Age Same Age	Noraebang Accompaniment Quiz	Bbaek Ga (Koyote), Jeon Somi, Jeong Dong-won
280	September 9	Kumho Happiness Market, Seongnam	Age Age Same Age	IU (feat. G-Dragon (BigBang)) - Palette	Bbaek Ga (Koyote), Jeon Somi, Jeong Dong-won
281	September 16	Central Market, Daejeon	AS Doctoral Lab	CL - The Seaweed Sway	Kim Jong-soo, Lee Dong-hwi, Park So-yi
281	September 16	Central Market, Daejeon	AS Doctoral Lab	I Can See Your Title (Dramas, Movies, Animations)	Kim Jong-soo, Lee Dong-hwi, Park So-yi
281	September 16	Central Market, Daejeon	AS Doctoral Lab	Ryang Hyun Ryang Ha - Popcorn Love!	Kim Jong-soo, Lee Dong-hwi, Park So-yi
282	September 23	Gwanyang Market, Anyang	K-Eldest Child	AKMU - Love Lee	Sandara Park, Jung Yong-hwa (CNBLUE), Lee Hong-gi (F.T. Island)
282	September 23	Gwanyang Market, Anyang	K-Eldest Child	Doppelganger Quiz (Singers)	Sandara Park, Jung Yong-hwa (CNBLUE), Lee Hong-gi (F.T. Island)
282	September 23	Gwanyang Market, Anyang	K-Eldest Child	YB (feat. Drunken Tiger) - Peppermint Candy 2	Sandara Park, Jung Yong-hwa (CNBLUE), Lee Hong-gi (F.T. Island)
283	September 30	Oedong Traditional Market, Gimhae	Chuseok Holiday on The 30th	Pearl - I Saw It	Jung So-min, Song Hae-na, Eom Ji-yoon
283	September 30	Oedong Traditional Market, Gimhae	Chuseok Holiday on The 30th	If It's the End Quiz	Jung So-min, Song Hae-na, Eom Ji-yoon
283	September 30	Oedong Traditional Market, Gimhae	Chuseok Holiday on The 30th	Kara - Pandora	Jung So-min, Song Hae-na, Eom Ji-yoon
284	October 7	Bangsin Traditional Market, Seoul	Ballad in the Autumn	Dynamic Duo, Lee Young-ji - Smoke	Lee Seok-hoon (SG Wannabe), Car, the Garden, Kim Min-seok (MeloMance)
284	October 7	Bangsin Traditional Market, Seoul	Ballad in the Autumn	Lyrics Reading Quiz	Lee Seok-hoon (SG Wannabe), Car, the Garden, Kim Min-seok (MeloMance)
284	October 7	Bangsin Traditional Market, Seoul	Ballad in the Autumn	Lee Seung-hwan - Dating Expert	Lee Seok-hoon (SG Wannabe), Car, the Garden, Kim Min-seok (MeloMance)
285	October 14	—N/a (Note: There is no featured market in this special episode, as the served foods were sourced from Pocheon.)	Saturday is Hero's Time	BTS - Make It Right	Lim Young-woong
285	October 14	—N/a	Saturday is Hero's Time	Song Abbreviation Quiz (Note: The snack games are group games between Team Hero (Consists of Shin Dong-yup, Moon Se-yoon, Hanhae and Lim Young-woong) and Team Keyeoro (Consists of Kim Dong-hyun, Park Na-rae, Taeyeon and Key).); Continue to Sing Quiz	Lim Young-woong
286	October 21	Gunpo Yeokjeon Market, Gunpo	What Kind of Situation is This?	Hwasa (Mamamoo) - I Love My Body	Jessi, Chuu
286	October 21	Gunpo Yeokjeon Market, Gunpo	What Kind of Situation is This?	Consonants Quiz (Hamburger)	Jessi, Chuu
286	October 21	Gunpo Yeokjeon Market, Gunpo	What Kind of Situation is This?	Winner - I Love U	Jessi, Chuu
287	October 28	Pyeonghwa Market, Daegu	AS Heaven	Kim Se-jeong - Jenga	Seventeen (Mingyu, Seungkwan, Dino)
287	October 28	Pyeonghwa Market, Daegu	AS Heaven	Music Video Scene Quiz	Seventeen (Mingyu, Seungkwan, Dino)
287	October 28	Pyeonghwa Market, Daegu	AS Heaven	Seen Hyun-hee - Mishmash	Seventeen (Mingyu, Seungkwan, Dino)
288	November 4	Sinheung Market, Seoul	Something Happened in Deserted Island	Jessi - Cold Blooded	Park Eun-bin, Chae Jong-hyeop, Cha Hak-yeon (VIXX)
288	November 4	Sinheung Market, Seoul	Something Happened in Deserted Island	Doppelganger Quiz (Actors/Actresses)	Park Eun-bin, Chae Jong-hyeop, Cha Hak-yeon (VIXX)
288	November 4	Sinheung Market, Seoul	Something Happened in Deserted Island	AKMU - Freedom	Park Eun-bin, Chae Jong-hyeop, Cha Hak-yeon (VIXX)
289	November 11	Jukdo Market, Pohang	P.O is Coming Back	Zico (Block B) (feat. Penomeco) - Another Level	Hwang Je-sung, Kwon Hyuk-soo, Kwak Beom
289	November 11	Jukdo Market, Pohang	P.O is Coming Back	Consonants Quiz (Ramyeon Brands)	Hwang Je-sung, Kwon Hyuk-soo, Kwak Beom
289	November 11	Jukdo Market, Pohang	P.O is Coming Back	Shindosi Power - Straight Outta Newtown	Hwang Je-sung, Kwon Hyuk-soo, Kwak Beom
290	November 18	Mokdong Moonlight Street Market, Seoul	AS Kids on the Block	NewJeans - Zero	Stray Kids (Changbin, Felix)
290	November 18	Mokdong Moonlight Street Market, Seoul	AS Kids on the Block	Noraebang Accompaniment Quiz	Stray Kids (Changbin, Felix)
290	November 18	Mokdong Moonlight Street Market, Seoul	AS Kids on the Block	Taeyong (NCT) - Shalala	Stray Kids (Changbin, Felix)
291	November 25	Hwangnam Market, Gyeongju	You Are Hip, I Am Hop	Heize - Vingle Vingle	Swings, Crush
291	November 25	Hwangnam Market, Gyeongju	You Are Hip, I Am Hop	Find The Source of This Meme	Swings, Crush
291	November 25	Hwangnam Market, Gyeongju	You Are Hip, I Am Hop	OLNL (feat. Kid Milli) - Bluetooth	Swings, Crush
292	December 2	Baekryeon Market, Seoul	Amazing Broadway	Seventeen - God of Music	Kim Ho-young, Jo Kwon (2AM)
292	December 2	Baekryeon Market, Seoul	Amazing Broadway	If It's the End Quiz	Kim Ho-young, Jo Kwon (2AM)
292	December 2	Baekryeon Market, Seoul	Amazing Broadway	Jeon Somi - Dumb Dumb	Kim Ho-young, Jo Kwon (2AM)
293	December 9	Gangnam Market, Incheon	Royal Family	Gwana - 100 Ramyeon That Filled Our Stomachs	Lee Kyung-kyu, Lee Chang-ho
293	December 9	Gangnam Market, Incheon	Royal Family	I Can See Your Title (Movies & Animations)	Lee Kyung-kyu, Lee Chang-ho
293	December 9	Gangnam Market, Incheon	Royal Family	Kang Ho-dong (feat. Jung Eun-ji (Apink)) - One Minute Ago	Lee Kyung-kyu, Lee Chang-ho
294	December 16	Haeundae Market, Busan	Things That Happened in 2003	Taemin (Shinee) - Guilty	TVXQ
294	December 16	Haeundae Market, Busan	Things That Happened in 2003	Find The Source of This Meme	TVXQ
294	December 16	Haeundae Market, Busan	Things That Happened in 2003	Lee Jung-hyun - Crazy	TVXQ
295	December 23	Saemaeul Traditional Market, Seoul	Merry Christmas in Advance	Jannabi (feat. Lee Su-hyun (AKMU)) - Made In Christmas	Lee Chang-sub (BtoB), Heize
295	December 23	Saemaeul Traditional Market, Seoul	Merry Christmas in Advance	Lyrics in the Square Quiz	Lee Chang-sub (BtoB), Heize
295	December 23	Saemaeul Traditional Market, Seoul	Merry Christmas in Advance	Super Junior - Celebrate	Lee Chang-sub (BtoB), Heize
296	December 30	Heukseok Market, Seoul	Along With the g.o.d	Uptown - Ola Ola	g.o.d (Park Joon-hyung, Kim Tae-woo)
296	December 30	Heukseok Market, Seoul	Along With the g.o.d	Who Are Today's 1st Place Nominees?	g.o.d (Park Joon-hyung, Kim Tae-woo)
296	December 30	Heukseok Market, Seoul	Along With the g.o.d	Koyote - Bing Bing	g.o.d (Park Joon-hyung, Kim Tae-woo)

== Episodes (2024) ==
List of episodes in 2024 (episode 297-347)

Ep.	Air Date	Featured Market	Dressing Theme Concept	Song Questions + Snack Time Game	Guest(s)
297	January 6	Kakyung Terminal Market, Cheongju	2024 Tell Me Your Dragon Wish	Space A - Lips	Brian Joo (Fly to the Sky), Kyuhyun (Super Junior)
297	January 6	Kakyung Terminal Market, Cheongju	2024 Tell Me Your Dragon Wish	Music Video Scene Quiz	Brian Joo (Fly to the Sky), Kyuhyun (Super Junior)
297	January 6	Kakyung Terminal Market, Cheongju	2024 Tell Me Your Dragon Wish	Stray Kids - Lalalala	Brian Joo (Fly to the Sky), Kyuhyun (Super Junior)
298	January 13	Ttukdo Market, Seoul	Shopping Mall on Saturday	Zion.T - Not For Sale	Lee Dong-wook, Kim Hye-jun
298	January 13	Ttukdo Market, Seoul	Shopping Mall on Saturday	Doppelganger Quiz (Actors/Actresses)	Lee Dong-wook, Kim Hye-jun
298	January 13	Ttukdo Market, Seoul	Shopping Mall on Saturday	Young Turks Club - White War	Lee Dong-wook, Kim Hye-jun
299 (Note: Due to the broadcast of the 2023 AFC Asian Cup in Qatar on January 20, this episode aired a week later than its original date.)	January 27	Hyeondae Market, Seongnam	Saturday Animal Farm	IU - Shoes	Kim Seo-hyung, Lee Hyun-woo
299	January 27	Hyeondae Market, Seongnam	Saturday Animal Farm	Voice Support Quiz (Dramas, Movies)	Kim Seo-hyung, Lee Hyun-woo
299	January 27	Hyeondae Market, Seongnam	Saturday Animal Farm	BtoB - Ello Ello	Kim Seo-hyung, Lee Hyun-woo
300	February 3	Yongmun Millennium Market, Yangpyeong	300th Episode Special - 300th Fierce Saturday	Lee Seung-yoon - Some Some Some (Note: The song dictation is played as a mafia song dictation. There are 2 mafias (3 for Episodes 359 and 375) and the rest are citizens, with the mafias knowing all the correct lyrics beforehand. There are a total of five (four in Episodes 317, 325, and 375, three in Episode 359) attempts, and each time they fail, the citizens are given a chance to arrest the mafia through voting. The arrested member cannot participate in subsequent attempt(s) of the song dictation. In addition, every failed attempt leads to the mafia team being able to delete a chance out of the available chances on the Chance Board. If the citizens succeed in the song dictation or arrest all mafias before using up all song dictation attempts, the citizen team wins. The mafia team wins if the song dictation is failed. The winning team would receive a prize.) (Note: Arrested players: 1st attempt - Moon Se-yoon (citizen) 2nd attempt - P.O (citizen) 3rd attempt - Key (mafia) As they succeeded on the 4th attempt, the citizen team wins. Park Na-rae was revealed to be the other mafia.)	—N/a
300	February 3	Yongmun Millennium Market, Yangpyeong	300th Episode Special - 300th Fierce Saturday	Lyrics in the Square Quiz	—N/a
301	February 10	Mangwon Market, Seoul	A Round Seollal	Lee Chan-hyuk (AKMU) - 1 Trillion	Lee Ho-cheol, Na Sun-uk
301	February 10	Mangwon Market, Seoul	A Round Seollal	New/Old Neologism Quiz	Lee Ho-cheol, Na Sun-uk
301	February 10	Mangwon Market, Seoul	A Round Seollal	Young Tak - Form	Lee Ho-cheol, Na Sun-uk
302 (Note: Special appearance by Choi Gyu-ri as a special correspondent via VCR.)	February 17	Nambu Market, Yangsan	Marry My Saturday	2PM - Space Maja	Park Min-young, Na In-woo
302	February 17	Nambu Market, Yangsan	Marry My Saturday	Guess Them Right! Homes	Park Min-young, Na In-woo
302	February 17	Nambu Market, Yangsan	Marry My Saturday	Navi (feat. Hyuna) - Wasteful Tears	Park Min-young, Na In-woo
303	February 24	Dongmyo Market, Seoul	Today is Easy Saturday	GroovyRoom (feat. Huh Yunjin (Le Sserafim), Crush) - Yes or No	Le Sserafim (Kim Chae-won, Hong Eun-chae)
303	February 24	Dongmyo Market, Seoul	Today is Easy Saturday	Lyrics in the Square Quiz	Le Sserafim (Kim Chae-won, Hong Eun-chae)
303	February 24	Dongmyo Market, Seoul	Today is Easy Saturday	Nmixx - Soñar (Breaker)	Le Sserafim (Kim Chae-won, Hong Eun-chae)
304	March 2	Guri Traditional Market, Guri	Vocal Has Appeared	Park Hyo-shin - Comfort	Kim Bum-soo, Seo Eun-kwang (BtoB)
304	March 2	Guri Traditional Market, Guri	Vocal Has Appeared	Noraebang Accompaniment Quiz	Kim Bum-soo, Seo Eun-kwang (BtoB)
304	March 2	Guri Traditional Market, Guri	Vocal Has Appeared	Bada - Dance Mission	Kim Bum-soo, Seo Eun-kwang (BtoB)
305	March 9	Taepyeong Traditional Market, Daejeon	Do You Like Spring?	(G)I-dle - Allergy	Chungha, Bibi
305	March 9	Taepyeong Traditional Market, Daejeon	Do You Like Spring?	Lyrics Reading Quiz	Chungha, Bibi
305	March 9	Taepyeong Traditional Market, Daejeon	Do You Like Spring?	Jeon Somi - Fxxked Up	Chungha, Bibi
306	March 16	Gwangan Complex Market, Busan	Amazing Upgrade	Tiger JK - Mantra	Swings, Jung Hyuk
306	March 16	Gwangan Complex Market, Busan	Amazing Upgrade	Consonants Quiz (Ramyeon)	Swings, Jung Hyuk
306	March 16	Gwangan Complex Market, Busan	Amazing Upgrade	Lee Hyo-ri (feat. Teddy Park) - Anyclub	Swings, Jung Hyuk
307	March 23	Seokchon Market, Seoul	Tearful Saturday	ZE:A - Variety of Ways	Kim Ji-won, Kwak Dong-yeon
307	March 23	Seokchon Market, Seoul	Tearful Saturday	Doppelganger Quiz (Actors/Actresses)	Kim Ji-won, Kwak Dong-yeon
307	March 23	Seokchon Market, Seoul	Tearful Saturday	Cherry Filter - Supermarket	Kim Ji-won, Kwak Dong-yeon
308	March 30	Tongjin Market, Gimpo	Great Musical Star	JuJu Club - Essay Love	Ha Do-kwon, K.Will
308	March 30	Tongjin Market, Gimpo	Great Musical Star	If It's the End Quiz	Ha Do-kwon, K.Will
308	March 30	Tongjin Market, Gimpo	Great Musical Star	Beenzino (feat. Cautious Clay) - Travel Again	Ha Do-kwon, K.Will
309	April 6	Yukgeori Traditional Market, Cheongju	6th Anniversary Special - 6th Amazing Saturday	Speed Dictation Songs: (Note: The song dictation is played as a speed song dictation. The cast members and guests are split into 4 teams, and there are 6 rounds of song dictation. After the leader gets the chance by pressing the button, the team takes turn answering one line in order, with the keywords shown as markers for the next answering line. The team that answers all 4 lines of the song correctly first wins a point(s)(1 point for round 1-3, 2 points for round 4-5, and 6 points for round 6).) (Note: For this episode, the 4 teams are: Team Kim Dong-hyun (Kim Dong-hyun, Moon Se-yoon, P.O, Yeonjun), Team Jo Hye-ryun (Jo Hye-ryun, Shin Dong-yup, Nucksal, Gabee), Team Haha (Haha, Hanhae, Taeyeon, Sakura), Team Bbaek Ga (Bbaek Ga, Park Na-rae, Key, Eunhyuk).) (Note: Winning team: 1st round - Team Kim Dong-hyun 2nd round - Team Bbaek Ga 3rd round - Team Bbaek Ga 4th round - Team Haha 5th round - Team Haha 6th round - Team Kim Dong-hyun Final result: Team Kim Dong-hyun - 7 points Team Haha - 4 points Team Bbaek Ga - 2 points Team Jo Hye-ryun - 0 point); Tei - Love Leaves Its Scent; Cool - Sorrow; G-Dragon (BigBang) - Crooked; TWS - Plot Twist; Zico (Block B) - Artist; Red Velvet - Red Flavor	Jo Hye-ryun, Haha, Bbaek Ga (Koyote), Eunhyuk (Super Junior), Gabee, Sakura (Le Sserafim), Yeonjun (TXT)
309	April 6	Yukgeori Traditional Market, Cheongju	6th Anniversary Special - 6th Amazing Saturday	Facial Recognition Quiz (Actors/Actresses); MZ Phrase Quiz; Lyrics in the Square Quiz; Dialect Tour; Consonants Quiz (Singers)	Jo Hye-ryun, Haha, Bbaek Ga (Koyote), Eunhyuk (Super Junior), Gabee, Sakura (Le Sserafim), Yeonjun (TXT)
310	April 13	Yukgeori Traditional Market, Cheongju	6th Anniversary Special - Found It! AS Treasure!	Speed Dictation Songs: (Note: For this episode, the 4 teams are: Team Kim Dong-hyun (Kim Dong-hyun, Shin Dong-yup, Nucksal, Sakura), Team Jo Hye-ryun (Jo Hye-ryun, Key, Gabee, Yeonjun), Team Eun Ji-won (Eun Ji-won, Moon Se-yoon, Hanhae, Eunhyuk), Team Bbaek Ga (Bbaek Ga, Park Na-rae, Taeyeon, Kwak Beom).) (Note: Winning team: 1st round - Team Eun Ji-won 2nd round - Team Jo Hye-ryun 3rd round - Team Jo Hye-ryun 4th round - Team Eun Ji-won 5th round - Team Jo Hye-ryun 6th round - Team Jo Hye-ryun Final result: Team Jo Hye-ryun - 11 points Team Eun Ji-won - 3 points Team Bbaek Ga - 0 points Team Kim Dong-hyun - 0 point); Roo'ra - Angel Without Wings; Rain - How to Avoid the Sun; Sistar - Loving U 2PM - Hands Up; BTS - Blood Sweat & Tears; Twice - TT	Jo Hye-ryun, Eun Ji-won (Sechs Kies), Bbaek Ga (Koyote), Eunhyuk (Super Junior), Kwak Beom, Gabee, Sakura (Le Sserafim), Yeonjun (TXT)
310	April 13	Yukgeori Traditional Market, Cheongju	6th Anniversary Special - Found It! AS Treasure!	Alien Language Reading Quiz; Who Are Today's 1st Place Nominees? Your Eyes, Nose, Lips Quiz; Abbreviation Quiz; Facial Recognition Quiz (Singers); If It's the End Quiz	Jo Hye-ryun, Eun Ji-won (Sechs Kies), Bbaek Ga (Koyote), Eunhyuk (Super Junior), Kwak Beom, Gabee, Sakura (Le Sserafim), Yeonjun (TXT)
311	April 20	Seongdae Traditional Market, Seoul	Something Happened in AS Girls' High School	Insooni - Again	Park Ji-yoon, Bibi, Choi Ye-na
311	April 20	Seongdae Traditional Market, Seoul	Something Happened in AS Girls' High School	Voice Support Quiz (Variety Shows)	Park Ji-yoon, Bibi, Choi Ye-na
311	April 20	Seongdae Traditional Market, Seoul	Something Happened in AS Girls' High School	Kiha & The Faces - All Alone	Park Ji-yoon, Bibi, Choi Ye-na
312 (Note: Special appearances by Ryan Gosling and Emily Blunt as special correspondents via VCR.)	April 27	Sinwol 3-dong Alley Shopping District, Seoul	B to B	Lee Min-hyuk (BtoB) - Boom	BtoB (Seo Eun-kwang, Lee Chang-sub, Yook Sung-jae)
312	April 27	Sinwol 3-dong Alley Shopping District, Seoul	B to B	Alien Language Reading Quiz	BtoB (Seo Eun-kwang, Lee Chang-sub, Yook Sung-jae)
312	April 27	Sinwol 3-dong Alley Shopping District, Seoul	B to B	Le Sserafim - Smart	BtoB (Seo Eun-kwang, Lee Chang-sub, Yook Sung-jae)
313	May 4	Geumnam Market, Seoul	Solo Heaven	(G)I-dle - Fate	Hyuna, Zico (Block B), Lee Mu-jin
313	May 4	Geumnam Market, Seoul	Solo Heaven	Music Video Scene Quiz	Hyuna, Zico (Block B), Lee Mu-jin
313	May 4	Geumnam Market, Seoul	Solo Heaven	Crush (feat. Zion.T) - Hey Baby	Hyuna, Zico (Block B), Lee Mu-jin
314	May 11	Bangcheon Market, Daegu	Birth of a Family	Bijou - Love Love	Kim So-hyun, Son Jun-ho
314	May 11	Bangcheon Market, Daegu	Birth of a Family	I Can See Your Title (Musical & Musical Movies)	Kim So-hyun, Son Jun-ho
314	May 11	Bangcheon Market, Daegu	Birth of a Family	Illit - Magnetic	Kim So-hyun, Son Jun-ho
315	May 18	Yonghyeon Market, Incheon	Super Space Nice!	Red Velvet - Bing Bing	Aespa
315	May 18	Yonghyeon Market, Incheon	Super Space Nice!	What's Your Name? (Manhwa and Animation Characters)	Aespa
315	May 18	Yonghyeon Market, Incheon	Super Space Nice!	ONF - Beautiful Beautiful	Aespa
316	May 25	Jongno Shinjin Market, Seoul	Perfect Day to Graduate	Lee Jung-hyun - Half	Jung Ryeo-won, Wi Ha-joon
316	May 25	Jongno Shinjin Market, Seoul	Perfect Day to Graduate	I Can See Your Title (Webtoons & Webnovels)	Jung Ryeo-won, Wi Ha-joon
316	May 25	Jongno Shinjin Market, Seoul	Perfect Day to Graduate	GroovyRoom (feat. Chungha, Vinxen) - My Paradise	Jung Ryeo-won, Wi Ha-joon
317	June 1	Central Market, Cheonan	It's Already Summer War	Turtles - Airplane (Note: Moon Se-yoon knew the correct answer, so as a result of discussion among the production team, he did not participate in the song dictation segment, and became the MC alongside Boom.) (Note: Arrested players: 1st attempt - Hanhae (citizen) As they succeeded on the 2nd attempt, the citizen team wins. Shin Dong-yup & Song Seung-heon were revealed to be the mafias.)	Song Seung-heon, Lee Si-eon, Oh Yeon-seo, Tae Won-seok
317	June 1	Central Market, Cheonan	It's Already Summer War	Omniscient Dialogue View; Director Quiz; Noraebang Accompaniment Quiz	Song Seung-heon, Lee Si-eon, Oh Yeon-seo, Tae Won-seok
318	June 8	Yongsan Yongmun Market, Seoul	Openly Princess	Ive - Heya	Pyo Ye-jin, Lee Jun-young
318	June 8	Yongsan Yongmun Market, Seoul	Openly Princess	What's Your Name? (Things)	Pyo Ye-jin, Lee Jun-young
318	June 8	Yongsan Yongmun Market, Seoul	Openly Princess	Ink - Cinderella Complex	Pyo Ye-jin, Lee Jun-young
319	June 15	Wolgok Market, Gwangju	Saturday Bomb! Waterbomb!	Koyote - Broken Heart	Sunmi, Nayeon (Twice), Kwon Eun-bi
319	June 15	Wolgok Market, Gwangju	Saturday Bomb! Waterbomb!	Who Are Your Parents?	Sunmi, Nayeon (Twice), Kwon Eun-bi
319	June 15	Wolgok Market, Gwangju	Saturday Bomb! Waterbomb!	Zerobaseone - Feel the Pop	Sunmi, Nayeon (Twice), Kwon Eun-bi
320	June 22	Traditional Market, Yangyang	The Monster Has Appeared!	Bom Yeoreum Gaeul Kyeoul - Di Bap	Yoo Jun-sang, Kyuhyun (Super Junior)
320	June 22	Traditional Market, Yangyang	The Monster Has Appeared!	What's Your Name? (Generation Connecting Things)	Yoo Jun-sang, Kyuhyun (Super Junior)
320	June 22	Traditional Market, Yangyang	The Monster Has Appeared!	Seventeen - Maestro	Yoo Jun-sang, Kyuhyun (Super Junior)
321	June 29	Youngdonggyo Alley Market, Seoul	Housewarming on Saturday	Jo Sung-mo - I Swear	Lee Sung-min, Lee Hee-joon, Gong Seung-yeon
321	June 29	Youngdonggyo Alley Market, Seoul	Housewarming on Saturday	Why Are You Coming Out From There?	Lee Sung-min, Lee Hee-joon, Gong Seung-yeon
321	June 29	Youngdonggyo Alley Market, Seoul	Housewarming on Saturday	Twice - Look At Me	Lee Sung-min, Lee Hee-joon, Gong Seung-yeon
322	July 6	Jumunjin General Market, Gangneung	Amazing Partner	Lee Mu-jin - Episode	Jang Na-ra, Kim Jun-han, Nam Ji-hyun
322	July 6	Jumunjin General Market, Gangneung	Amazing Partner	Omniscient Dialogue View	Jang Na-ra, Kim Jun-han, Nam Ji-hyun
322	July 6	Jumunjin General Market, Gangneung	Amazing Partner	T.J - Bad Habit	Jang Na-ra, Kim Jun-han, Nam Ji-hyun
323	July 13	Namseong Sagye Market, Seoul	Are You T? Are You J?	Roo'ra - Summer Of Love	Jang Hyuk
323	July 13	Namseong Sagye Market, Seoul	Are You T? Are You J?	How Much Do You Like Mukbang	Jang Hyuk
323	July 13	Namseong Sagye Market, Seoul	Are You T? Are You J?	Changmo - I Always	Jang Hyuk
324	July 20	Sangdaewon Market, Seongnam	Spooky Saturday	Taemin (Shinee) - Mystery Lover	Stray Kids (Lee Know, Felix, Seungmin)
324	July 20	Sangdaewon Market, Seongnam	Spooky Saturday	A Ghost Appeared!	Stray Kids (Lee Know, Felix, Seungmin)
324	July 20	Sangdaewon Market, Seongnam	Spooky Saturday	Nayeon (Twice) - Pop!	Stray Kids (Lee Know, Felix, Seungmin)
325	July 27	Daerim Market & Daelim Alley Market, Seoul	Up Up the Airplane	Cool - Before Sadness Comes (Note: Arrested players: 1st attempt - Hanhae (citizen) 2nd attempt - Jo Jung-suk (citizen) As they succeeded on the 3rd attempt, the citizen team wins. Kim Dong-hyun & Han Sun-hwa were revealed to be the mafias.)	Jo Jung-suk, Han Sun-hwa, Lee Ju-myoung, Shin Seung-ho
325	July 27	Daerim Market & Daelim Alley Market, Seoul	Up Up the Airplane	What's Your Name? (Nostalgic Snacks); Voice Support Quiz (Dramas, Movies); If It's the End Quiz	Jo Jung-suk, Han Sun-hwa, Lee Ju-myoung, Shin Seung-ho
326	August 3	Uijeongbu Jeil Market, Uijeongbu	Crooked on Saturday	Yoo Jae-suk (feat. Song Eun-i, Kim Sook) - Summer	Ahn Young-mi, Ji Ye-eun
326	August 3	Uijeongbu Jeil Market, Uijeongbu	Crooked on Saturday	New/Old Neologism Quiz	Ahn Young-mi, Ji Ye-eun
326	August 3	Uijeongbu Jeil Market, Uijeongbu	Crooked on Saturday	UV (feat. Yoo Byung-jae, Jonathan Yiombi) - Shaggy Cut	Ahn Young-mi, Ji Ye-eun
327	August 10	Omokgyo Jungang Market, Seoul	You Idol? I'm (G)I-dle!	2NE1 - Can't Nobody	(G)I-dle (Miyeon, Yuqi, Shuhua)
327	August 10	Omokgyo Jungang Market, Seoul	You Idol? I'm (G)I-dle!	Fashion King on Stage	(G)I-dle (Miyeon, Yuqi, Shuhua)
327	August 10	Omokgyo Jungang Market, Seoul	You Idol? I'm (G)I-dle!	TXT - Blue Orangeade	(G)I-dle (Miyeon, Yuqi, Shuhua)
328	August 17	Sinnaedang Market, Daegu	I'm the Mom's Friend's Son	Oh My Girl - Summer Comes	Jung Hae-in, Jung So-min, Kim Ji-eun
328	August 17	Sinnaedang Market, Daegu	I'm the Mom's Friend's Son	Mom's Friend's Son & Mom's Friend's Daughter	Jung Hae-in, Jung So-min, Kim Ji-eun
328	August 17	Sinnaedang Market, Daegu	I'm the Mom's Friend's Son	Zizo (feat. Lee Won-suk (Daybreak)) - Coming Home	Jung Hae-in, Jung So-min, Kim Ji-eun
329	August 24	Yaksu Market, Seoul	In the Woods with Many People	Shinhwa - Eusha! Eusha!	Yoon Kye-sang (g.o.d), Go Min-si
329	August 24	Yaksu Market, Seoul	In the Woods with Many People	Omniscient Dialogue View	Yoon Kye-sang (g.o.d), Go Min-si
329	August 24	Yaksu Market, Seoul	In the Woods with Many People	BtoB - Thriller	Yoon Kye-sang (g.o.d), Go Min-si
330	August 31	Dokkaebi Market, Uiwang	Rock'n AS	Kang Seung-yoon (Winner) (feat. Swings) - Instinctively	Lee Seung-chul, Urban Zakapa
330	August 31	Dokkaebi Market, Uiwang	Rock'n AS	Lyrics in the Square Quiz	Lee Seung-chul, Urban Zakapa
330	August 31	Dokkaebi Market, Uiwang	Rock'n AS	Stray Kids - Chk Chk Boom	Lee Seung-chul, Urban Zakapa
331	September 7	Bongilcheon Traditional Market, Paju	Saturday's Workout is Completed	Koyote - Passion	Jin Seo-yeon, Uee, Park Ju-hyun, Seol In-ah
331	September 7	Bongilcheon Traditional Market, Paju	Saturday's Workout is Completed	Today's Workout Scene Quiz	Jin Seo-yeon, Uee, Park Ju-hyun, Seol In-ah
331	September 7	Bongilcheon Traditional Market, Paju	Saturday's Workout is Completed	Insooni - Higher	Jin Seo-yeon, Uee, Park Ju-hyun, Seol In-ah
332	September 14	Sinpo International Market, Incheon	Girl Girl What Girl? (Note: Korean word "걸")	Dooly School - Dooly the Little Dinosaur	Oh My Girl (YooA, Seunghee, Yubin)
332	September 14	Sinpo International Market, Incheon	Girl Girl What Girl?	What's Your Name? (Domestic Characters)	Oh My Girl (YooA, Seunghee, Yubin)
332	September 14	Sinpo International Market, Incheon	Girl Girl What Girl?	Coffee Boy - English	Oh My Girl (YooA, Seunghee, Yubin)
333	September 21	Tongbok Market, Pyeongtaek	Sloppy Detective Squad	Turtles - It's Been a Long Time	Kim Dong-wook, Park Ji-hwan, Seo Hyun-woo
333	September 21	Tongbok Market, Pyeongtaek	Sloppy Detective Squad	Guess It Right Crime Scene	Kim Dong-wook, Park Ji-hwan, Seo Hyun-woo
333	September 21	Tongbok Market, Pyeongtaek	Sloppy Detective Squad	g.o.d - G'swag	Kim Dong-wook, Park Ji-hwan, Seo Hyun-woo
334	September 28	Hwajeong Western Market, Gwangju	Saturday Get an Alter Ego	Badkiz - Ear Attack 2	Kwak Beom, Lee Chang-ho, Kim Hae-jun
334	September 28	Hwajeong Western Market, Gwangju	Saturday Get an Alter Ego	Who Are Your Parents?	Kwak Beom, Lee Chang-ho, Kim Hae-jun
334	September 28	Hwajeong Western Market, Gwangju	Saturday Get an Alter Ego	Super Junior - Scene Stealer	Kwak Beom, Lee Chang-ho, Kim Hae-jun
335	October 5	Jayu Market, Bucheon	Autumn is Dramatically	Le Sserafim - Crazy	K.Will, Muzie, Ha Sung-woon
335	October 5	Jayu Market, Bucheon	Autumn is Dramatically	Noraebang Accompaniment Quiz	K.Will, Muzie, Ha Sung-woon
335	October 5	Jayu Market, Bucheon	Autumn is Dramatically	Day6 - Counter	K.Will, Muzie, Ha Sung-woon
336	October 12	Ui Market, Seoul	Good Guy VS Bad Guy	Lucy - Villain	Lee Joon-hyuk, Hyun Bong-sik
336	October 12	Ui Market, Seoul	Good Guy VS Bad Guy	You're A Big Villain	Lee Joon-hyuk, Hyun Bong-sik
336	October 12	Ui Market, Seoul	Good Guy VS Bad Guy	Nayeon (Twice) - Halli Galli	Lee Joon-hyuk, Hyun Bong-sik
337	October 19	Maesan Traditional Market, Suwon	We're Set Set	ChoNam Zone - Delivery	Bbaek Ga (Koyote), Lee Sang-jun, Ji Ye-eun
337	October 19	Maesan Traditional Market, Suwon	We're Set Set	Consonants Quiz (Ramyeon)	Bbaek Ga (Koyote), Lee Sang-jun, Ji Ye-eun
337	October 19	Maesan Traditional Market, Suwon	We're Set Set	Ive - Eleven	Bbaek Ga (Koyote), Lee Sang-jun, Ji Ye-eun
338	October 26	Nambu Market, Jeonju	What Days is Today?	Cho Yong-pil - Pride	Shin Sung-rok, Min Woo-hyuk, Kim Gun-woo
338	October 26	Nambu Market, Jeonju	What Days is Today?	Find The Source of This Meme	Shin Sung-rok, Min Woo-hyuk, Kim Gun-woo
338	October 26	Nambu Market, Jeonju	What Days is Today?	Hwasa (Mamamoo) - Na	Shin Sung-rok, Min Woo-hyuk, Kim Gun-woo
339	November 2	Seokbawi Market, Incheon	Half Idol Half Actor	Choi Ye-na - Nemonemo	Kim Ye-won, Minho (Shinee), Seunghee (Oh My Girl)
339	November 2	Seokbawi Market, Incheon	Half Idol Half Actor	What's Your Name? (Things)	Kim Ye-won, Minho (Shinee), Seunghee (Oh My Girl)
339	November 2	Seokbawi Market, Incheon	Half Idol Half Actor	Young Tak (Duet with. Chee Kwang-min) - Goat Gamida	Kim Ye-won, Minho (Shinee), Seunghee (Oh My Girl)
340 (Note: Special appearances by Cynthia Erivo and Ariana Grande as special correspondents via VCR.)	November 9	Dunchon Station Traditional Market, Seoul	I Have JYP Inside Me!	Psy - The Mother of Success	Park Jin-young, Itzy (Yeji, Chaeryeong)
340	November 9	Dunchon Station Traditional Market, Seoul	I Have JYP Inside Me!	Fashion King on Stage	Park Jin-young, Itzy (Yeji, Chaeryeong)
340	November 9	Dunchon Station Traditional Market, Seoul	I Have JYP Inside Me!	The Grace (feat. Rain) - The Club	Park Jin-young, Itzy (Yeji, Chaeryeong)
341	November 16	Sanggye Central Market, Seoul	Amazing Fairyland	Catch! Teenieping - Key Teenieping Song	Tomorrow X Together (Yeonjun, Soobin, Beomgyu)
341	November 16	Sanggye Central Market, Seoul	Amazing Fairyland	New/Old Neologism Quiz	Tomorrow X Together (Yeonjun, Soobin, Beomgyu)
341	November 16	Sanggye Central Market, Seoul	Amazing Fairyland	CH!CKY - Choi's Drifting Experience	Tomorrow X Together (Yeonjun, Soobin, Beomgyu)
342	November 23	Jeongok Market, Yeoncheon	2024 F/W Friends	NCT Dream - Best Friend	Lee Joon, Hwasa (Mamamoo), Lee Mu-jin
342	November 23	Jeongok Market, Yeoncheon	2024 F/W Friends	Today's Workout Scene Quiz	Lee Joon, Hwasa (Mamamoo), Lee Mu-jin
342	November 23	Jeongok Market, Yeoncheon	2024 F/W Friends	Cherry Filter - Orange Road	Lee Joon, Hwasa (Mamamoo), Lee Mu-jin
343	November 30	Jeonnong Rotary Market, Seoul	Dear Judges, Referees	Cool - All For You	Go Soo, Yuri (Girls' Generation)
343	November 30	Jeonnong Rotary Market, Seoul	Dear Judges, Referees	Omniscient Dialogue View	Go Soo, Yuri (Girls' Generation)
343	November 30	Jeonnong Rotary Market, Seoul	Dear Judges, Referees	Hyoyeon (Girls' Generation) - Mystery	Go Soo, Yuri (Girls' Generation)
344	December 7	Chungmudong Seaside Market, Busan	December is Month of Costume	Stray Kids - Thunderous	Twice (Jihyo, Dahyun, Tzuyu)
344	December 7	Chungmudong Seaside Market, Busan	December is Month of Costume	Lightstick? Guess It Stick!	Twice (Jihyo, Dahyun, Tzuyu)
344	December 7	Chungmudong Seaside Market, Busan	December is Month of Costume	Wonder Girls - Back	Twice (Jihyo, Dahyun, Tzuyu)
345	December 14	Central Market, Yongin	Amazing Heroes	g.o.d - An Ordinary Day	Oh Dae-hwan, Joo Won, Lee Yoo-young
345	December 14	Central Market, Yongin	Amazing Heroes	What's Your Name? (Nostalgic Snacks)	Oh Dae-hwan, Joo Won, Lee Yoo-young
345	December 14	Central Market, Yongin	Amazing Heroes	Ive - Heroine	Oh Dae-hwan, Joo Won, Lee Yoo-young
346	December 21	Gwanak Shinsa Market, Seoul	A Heartwarming Christmas	Red Velvet & Aespa - Beautiful Christmas	Kang Hoon, Song Geon-hee, Yoo Seon-ho
346	December 21	Gwanak Shinsa Market, Seoul	A Heartwarming Christmas	Consonants Quiz (Hamburger)	Kang Hoon, Song Geon-hee, Yoo Seon-ho
346	December 21	Gwanak Shinsa Market, Seoul	A Heartwarming Christmas	Seo Taiji - Christmalo.win	Kang Hoon, Song Geon-hee, Yoo Seon-ho
347	December 28	Baeknyeon Market, Seoul	Year-End Special - End of the Year with True Friends	Riize - Happy! Happy! Happy!	Nam Chang-hee, Onew (Shinee), Car, the Garden
347	December 28	Baeknyeon Market, Seoul	Year-End Special - End of the Year with True Friends	Lyrics in the Square Quiz	Nam Chang-hee, Onew (Shinee), Car, the Garden
347	December 28	Baeknyeon Market, Seoul	Year-End Special - End of the Year with True Friends	SeSeSe - Amigar Restaurant	Nam Chang-hee, Onew (Shinee), Car, the Garden

== Episodes (2025) ==
List of episodes in 2025 (episode 348-398)

Ep.	Air Date	Featured Market	Dressing Theme Concept	Song Questions + Snack Time Game (Note: Shown in the following format beginning episode 382: Appetizer Game Song Dessert Time Game)	Guest(s)
348 (Note: Due to the mourning period after the Jeju Air Flight 2216 crash, this episode aired a week later than its original date.)	January 11	Suam Market, Ulsan	New Year Special - 2025 is Pretty Good	Turtles - Four Seasons	Julien Kang, Jong Tae-se, Mo Tae-bum
348	January 11	Suam Market, Ulsan	New Year Special - 2025 is Pretty Good	Today's Workout Scene Quiz	Julien Kang, Jong Tae-se, Mo Tae-bum
348	January 11	Suam Market, Ulsan	New Year Special - 2025 is Pretty Good	Super Junior-D&E - Can You Feel It?	Julien Kang, Jong Tae-se, Mo Tae-bum
349	January 18	Banghak-dong Dokkaebi Traditional Market, Seoul	Creepy Creepy Love Love	Highlight - Classic	Tei, Choi Jin-hyuk
349	January 18	Banghak-dong Dokkaebi Traditional Market, Seoul	Creepy Creepy Love Love	Alien Language Reading Quiz	Tei, Choi Jin-hyuk
349	January 18	Banghak-dong Dokkaebi Traditional Market, Seoul	Creepy Creepy Love Love	(G)I-dle - Villain Dies	Tei, Choi Jin-hyuk
350	January 25	Seomun Market Samgyeopsal Street, Cheongju	Let Me Introduce You to My Girlfriend	BtoB - My Friend's Girlfriend	GFriend (Yerin, SinB, Umji)
350	January 25	Seomun Market Samgyeopsal Street, Cheongju	Let Me Introduce You to My Girlfriend	What's Your Name? (Domestic Characters)	GFriend (Yerin, SinB, Umji)
350	January 25	Seomun Market Samgyeopsal Street, Cheongju	Let Me Introduce You to My Girlfriend	Lena Park - What a Pretty Girlfriend	GFriend (Yerin, SinB, Umji)
351	February 1	Dongwon Traditional General Market, Seoul	Saturday with Classical Music Flowing	Sung Si-kyung - Smiling Angel	D.O. (Exo), Won Jin-ah, Shin Ye-eun
351	February 1	Dongwon Traditional General Market, Seoul	Saturday with Classical Music Flowing	Omniscient Dialogue View	D.O. (Exo), Won Jin-ah, Shin Ye-eun
351	February 1	Dongwon Traditional General Market, Seoul	Saturday with Classical Music Flowing	Lokid (feat. Uyeon) - Cocktail Love	D.O. (Exo), Won Jin-ah, Shin Ye-eun
352	February 8	Dandae Traditional Market, Seongnam	Ah, I've Gotten Shy	Seventeen - Fronting	Ive (An Yu-jin, Rei, Liz)
352	February 8	Dandae Traditional Market, Seongnam	Ah, I've Gotten Shy	Consonants Quiz (Korean Fried Chicken Brands)	Ive (An Yu-jin, Rei, Liz)
352	February 8	Dandae Traditional Market, Seongnam	Ah, I've Gotten Shy	Aespa - Just Another Girl	Ive (An Yu-jin, Rei, Liz)
353	February 15	Dongnimmun Yeongcheon Market, Seoul	Gather Up King & Queen	Buck - You That Is Like Me	Kim So-hyun, Son Jun-ho
353	February 15	Dongnimmun Yeongcheon Market, Seoul	Gather Up King & Queen	What's Your Name? (Generation Connecting Things)	Kim So-hyun, Son Jun-ho
353	February 15	Dongnimmun Yeongcheon Market, Seoul	Gather Up King & Queen	Twice - BDZ (Korean Ver.)	Kim So-hyun, Son Jun-ho
354	February 22	Namdaemun Market, Seoul	A Three-Night Saturday	Young Turks Club - Affection	Jung Yi-lang, Lee Su-ji, Kim Ah-young, Lee Yong-jin
354	February 22	Namdaemun Market, Seoul	A Three-Night Saturday	Voice Support Quiz (Dramas, Movies)	Jung Yi-lang, Lee Su-ji, Kim Ah-young, Lee Yong-jin
354	February 22	Namdaemun Market, Seoul	A Three-Night Saturday	Rimi and Gamja - Hong Kong Restaurant	Jung Yi-lang, Lee Su-ji, Kim Ah-young, Lee Yong-jin
355	March 1	Sinheung Market, Bucheon	Gather Around! AS Farm	N.Flying - Hot Potato	Kang Tae-oh, Lee Sun-bin, Lee Yong-jin
355	March 1	Sinheung Market, Bucheon	Gather Around! AS Farm	Omniscient Dialogue View	Kang Tae-oh, Lee Sun-bin, Lee Yong-jin
355	March 1	Sinheung Market, Bucheon	Gather Around! AS Farm	BoyNextDoor - If I Say, I Love You	Kang Tae-oh, Lee Sun-bin, Lee Yong-jin
356	March 8	Suyeong Paldo Market, Busan	I'm the Original Hallyu Star!	Chakra - Sign of Separation	Baby Vox (Lee Hee-jin, Kan Mi-youn, Yoon Eun-hye)
356	March 8	Suyeong Paldo Market, Busan	I'm the Original Hallyu Star!	Fashion King on Stage	Baby Vox (Lee Hee-jin, Kan Mi-youn, Yoon Eun-hye)
356	March 8	Suyeong Paldo Market, Busan	I'm the Original Hallyu Star!	Young Posse - XXL	Baby Vox (Lee Hee-jin, Kan Mi-youn, Yoon Eun-hye)
357	March 15	Inwang Traditional Market, Seoul	This Is AS Street	Lexa - Walk Your Way	Jang Young-ran, Park Seul-gi, Kim Sae-rom
357	March 15	Inwang Traditional Market, Seoul	This Is AS Street	Omniscient Ment View	Jang Young-ran, Park Seul-gi, Kim Sae-rom
357	March 15	Inwang Traditional Market, Seoul	This Is AS Street	Sinstealer - Domestic Economy	Jang Young-ran, Park Seul-gi, Kim Sae-rom
358	March 22	Inheon Market, Seoul	Wee-Woo Wee-Woo AS Hospital	Soyeon ((G)I-dle) - Psycho	Park Eun-bin, Park Byung-eun, Yoon Chan-young
358	March 22	Inheon Market, Seoul	Wee-Woo Wee-Woo AS Hospital	Consonants Quiz (Snack Brands)	Park Eun-bin, Park Byung-eun, Yoon Chan-young
358	March 22	Inheon Market, Seoul	Wee-Woo Wee-Woo AS Hospital	Zerobaseone - Doctor! Doctor!	Park Eun-bin, Park Byung-eun, Yoon Chan-young
359	March 29	Nangman (Central) Market, Chuncheon	Today is Same Surname	R.ef - Shouting in Silence (Note: Arrested players: 1st attempt - Kim Dong-hyun (citizen) 2nd attempt - Nucksal (mafia) As they succeeded on the 3rd attempt, the citizen team wins. P.O and Lee Dong-wook were revealed to be the other mafias.)	Lee Dong-wook, Lee Joo-bin, Lee Kwang-soo, Lee Da-hee
359	March 29	Nangman (Central) Market, Chuncheon	Today is Same Surname	What's Your Name? (Compilation)	Lee Dong-wook, Lee Joo-bin, Lee Kwang-soo, Lee Da-hee
360	April 5	—N/a (Note: There is no featured market in this special episode.)	7th Anniversary Special - AS Game Arcade	AS Game Arcade: (Note: First episode in the show's history to have no song dictation at all in an episode, and only Snack Time games are played as the main segment called "AS Game Arcade". The cast members and guests are split into 2 teams, and there are 3 rounds. Each round has points: 200 points for round 1, 300 points for round 2, and 101 points for round 3. The team with the most cumulative points will be declared the winning team and will receive a prize) (Note: For this episode, the two teams are: Team Mi Crazy (consists of Shin Dong-yup, Kim Dong-hyun, Park Na-rae, Hanhae, Key and Mimi), and Team Skilled Yong (consists of Moon Se-yoon, Nucksal, P.O, Taeyeon, Bbaek Ga and Lee Yong-jin).) (Note: Each Round Winner: 1st round - Team Skilled Yong 2nd round - Team Mi Crazy 3rd round - Team Mi Crazy Final Result: Team Mi Crazy - 401 points (winning team) Team Skilled Yong - 200 points); Omniscient Dialogue View - Six United as One; Speed Quiz (What's Your Name? & Song Lyrics); Relay Lyrics in the Square Quiz	Bbaek Ga (Koyote), Lee Yong-jin, Mimi (Oh My Girl)
360	April 5	—N/a	7th Anniversary Special - AS Game Arcade	Oh~ Yeah~ Na~ Quiz	Bbaek Ga (Koyote), Lee Yong-jin, Mimi (Oh My Girl)
361	April 12	Seonam New Market, Daegu	7th Anniversary Special - I Am Stubborn	Drunken Tiger (feat. Dynamic Duo, Eun Ji-won (Sechs Kies)) - Stubborn Person	Rhymer, K.Will, Kim Ye-won
361	April 12	Seonam New Market, Daegu	7th Anniversary Special - I Am Stubborn	Interlude Jump Quiz	Rhymer, K.Will, Kim Ye-won
361	April 12	Seonam New Market, Daegu	7th Anniversary Special - I Am Stubborn	S.E.S. - ('Cause) I'm Your Girl	Rhymer, K.Will, Kim Ye-won
362	April 19	Central Market, Seoul	Knowing Brothers	Kim Hyun-chul - Take Off	Lee Hyun-woo, Yoon Sang, Kwon Eun-bi
362	April 19	Central Market, Seoul	Knowing Brothers	New/Old Neologism Quiz	Lee Hyun-woo, Yoon Sang, Kwon Eun-bi
362	April 19	Central Market, Seoul	Knowing Brothers	Le Sserafim - Hot	Lee Hyun-woo, Yoon Sang, Kwon Eun-bi
363	April 26	Taehwa General Market, Ulsan	I Saw the Devil on Saturday	Ma Dong-seok (feat. Eom Ji-hyeon) - B.D.T (Begin Delicious Time)	Seohyun (Girls' Generation), Kyung Soo-jin, Jung Ji-so
363	April 26	Taehwa General Market, Ulsan	I Saw the Devil on Saturday	Consonants Quiz (Songs)	Seohyun (Girls' Generation), Kyung Soo-jin, Jung Ji-so
363	April 26	Taehwa General Market, Ulsan	I Saw the Devil on Saturday	Hearts2Hearts - The Chase	Seohyun (Girls' Generation), Kyung Soo-jin, Jung Ji-so
364	May 3	Sinseong Traditional Market, Seoul	Saturday Health Club	Yoo Se-yoon - A Good Song for Workout	Lee Mi-do, Jung Eun-ji (Apink), Lee Jun-young
364	May 3	Sinseong Traditional Market, Seoul	Saturday Health Club	Noraebang Accompaniment Quiz	Lee Mi-do, Jung Eun-ji (Apink), Lee Jun-young
364	May 3	Sinseong Traditional Market, Seoul	Saturday Health Club	Son Dam-bi - The Clothes I'm Sick Of Wearing	Lee Mi-do, Jung Eun-ji (Apink), Lee Jun-young
365	May 10	Boseong Market, Jeju Island	Saturday Food Talk	Stray Kids - God's Menu	Kim Shin-rok, Kang Ha-neul, Yoo Su-bin, Go Min-si
365	May 10	Boseong Market, Jeju Island	Saturday Food Talk	How Much Do You Like Mukbang	Kim Shin-rok, Kang Ha-neul, Yoo Su-bin, Go Min-si
365	May 10	Boseong Market, Jeju Island	Saturday Food Talk	Pinkfong - Soup Bowl Pinkfong Speed Version	Kim Shin-rok, Kang Ha-neul, Yoo Su-bin, Go Min-si
366	May 17	Hangeul Market, Yeoju	It's a Festival	Taeyeon (Girls' Generation) - Eraser	Car, the Garden, Jung Seung-hwan, Bibi
366	May 17	Hangeul Market, Yeoju	It's a Festival	Dialect Tour	Car, the Garden, Jung Seung-hwan, Bibi
366	May 17	Hangeul Market, Yeoju	It's a Festival	TripleS - Rising	Car, the Garden, Jung Seung-hwan, Bibi
367	May 24	Gwanak Jungbu Market, Seoul	Please Take Care of the Company Dinner	Kisum - 2 Beer	Kim Sung-ryung, Sooyoung (Girls' Generation), Gong Myung
367	May 24	Gwanak Jungbu Market, Seoul	Please Take Care of the Company Dinner	I Can See Your Title (Korean Movies & Dramas)	Kim Sung-ryung, Sooyoung (Girls' Generation), Gong Myung
367	May 24	Gwanak Jungbu Market, Seoul	Please Take Care of the Company Dinner	Baekho - Elevator	Kim Sung-ryung, Sooyoung (Girls' Generation), Gong Myung
368	May 31	Jeongneung Market, Seoul	Off-duty Saturday	NCT Dream - Irreplaceable	Lee Eun-hyung, Ralral, Kim Jun-ho
368	May 31	Jeongneung Market, Seoul	Off-duty Saturday	What's Your Name? (Domestic Characters)	Lee Eun-hyung, Ralral, Kim Jun-ho
368	May 31	Jeongneung Market, Seoul	Off-duty Saturday	Kola - Mosquitoes	Lee Eun-hyung, Ralral, Kim Jun-ho
369	June 7	Seongjeong Market, Cheonan	You're X I'm Y	Defconn (feat. Kim Do-hyang) - City Life	Jung Hyung-don, Chung Seung-je
369	June 7	Seongjeong Market, Cheonan	You're X I'm Y	Big Appearance Quiz	Jung Hyung-don, Chung Seung-je
369	June 7	Seongjeong Market, Cheonan	You're X I'm Y	Seventeen - Left & Right	Jung Hyung-don, Chung Seung-je
370	June 14	Jowon Market, Suwon	The Heyday of Co-ed Group	BTS - Boyz With Fun	Jo Hye-ryun, Peppertones
370	June 14	Jowon Market, Suwon	The Heyday of Co-ed Group	Oh~ Yeah~ Na~ La~ Quiz	Jo Hye-ryun, Peppertones
370	June 14	Jowon Market, Suwon	The Heyday of Co-ed Group	AKMU - Give Love	Jo Hye-ryun, Peppertones
371	June 21	Chungsin Market, Seoul	The Hunters	Momoland - Freeze	Ryu Seung-soo, Kang Hoon, Park Ju-hyun
371	June 21	Chungsin Market, Seoul	The Hunters	Omniscient Dialogue View	Ryu Seung-soo, Kang Hoon, Park Ju-hyun
371	June 21	Chungsin Market, Seoul	The Hunters	Woodz - Sour Candy	Ryu Seung-soo, Kang Hoon, Park Ju-hyun
372	June 28	Yeonghwa Market, Gunsan	Folktales in the Summer	Dal Shabet - Hey Mr. Chu	Choo Ja-hyun, Cho Yi-hyun, Choo Young-woo
372	June 28	Yeonghwa Market, Gunsan	Folktales in the Summer	Doppelganger Quiz (Actors/Actresses)	Choo Ja-hyun, Cho Yi-hyun, Choo Young-woo
372	June 28	Yeonghwa Market, Gunsan	Folktales in the Summer	pH-1, Kim Sung-jae - As I Told You Remix	Choo Ja-hyun, Cho Yi-hyun, Choo Young-woo
373	July 5	Jowondong Penguin Market, Seoul	We Are Summer Workers	SM Town - Summer Vacation	Aespa
373	July 5	Jowondong Penguin Market, Seoul	We Are Summer Workers	Lyrics in the Square Quiz	Aespa
373	July 5	Jowondong Penguin Market, Seoul	We Are Summer Workers	H1-Key - Let It Burn	Aespa
374	July 12	Nambu Market, Iksan	Fighter Fighting!	Orange Caramel (feat. S.Coups (Seventeen)) - Superwoman	Uee, Keum Sae-rok, Kim Ji-hoon, DinDin
374	July 12	Nambu Market, Iksan	Fighter Fighting!	Hey A.I. Draw A Picture~	Uee, Keum Sae-rok, Kim Ji-hoon, DinDin
374	July 12	Nambu Market, Iksan	Fighter Fighting!	Monsta X - Fighter	Uee, Keum Sae-rok, Kim Ji-hoon, DinDin
375	July 19	Daejo Traditional Market, Seoul	Saturday Novel Club	Ive - Flu (Note: Arrested players: 1st attempt - Kim Dong-hyun (citizen) 2nd attempt - Shin Seung-ho (mafia) 3rd attempt - Taeyeon (mafia) 4th attempt - Ahn Hyo-seop (citizen) As they failed after all four attempts, the mafia team wins. Nana was revealed to be the other mafia.)	Ahn Hyo-seop, Nana, Chae Soo-bin, Shin Seung-ho
375	July 19	Daejo Traditional Market, Seoul	Saturday Novel Club	Consonants Quiz (Ice Cream Brands)	Ahn Hyo-seop, Nana, Chae Soo-bin, Shin Seung-ho
376	July 26	Taereung Market, Seoul	Amazing Country Bumpkins	Hyolyn & Dasom - Summer or Summer	Kim Eui-sung, U-Know Yunho (TVXQ), Yang Se-jong
376	July 26	Taereung Market, Seoul	Amazing Country Bumpkins	The Star's Childhood	Kim Eui-sung, U-Know Yunho (TVXQ), Yang Se-jong
376	July 26	Taereung Market, Seoul	Amazing Country Bumpkins	BtoB - Giddy Up	Kim Eui-sung, U-Know Yunho (TVXQ), Yang Se-jong
377	August 2	Jayu Market, Chungju	A Good Day to Move	Illit - Almond Chocolate (Korean Ver.)	Yoona (Girls' Generation), Ahn Bo-hyun
377	August 2	Jayu Market, Chungju	A Good Day to Move	Abbreviation Quiz (Webtoons & Webnovels)	Yoona (Girls' Generation), Ahn Bo-hyun
377	August 2	Jayu Market, Chungju	A Good Day to Move	Epik High - The Bad Guy	Yoona (Girls' Generation), Ahn Bo-hyun
378	August 9	Dolgoji Market, Seoul	With Mom and Me	CSR - Pop? Pop!	Yum Jung-ah, Park Hae-joon, Choi Yoon-ji
378	August 9	Dolgoji Market, Seoul	With Mom and Me	Big Appearance Quiz	Yum Jung-ah, Park Hae-joon, Choi Yoon-ji
378	August 9	Dolgoji Market, Seoul	With Mom and Me	BoyNextDoor - Dangerous	Yum Jung-ah, Park Hae-joon, Choi Yoon-ji
379	August 16	1913 Songjeong Station Market, Gwangju	The Reason I'm Solo	AllDay Project - Wicked	Im Woo-il, Wooyoung (2PM), Jeon Somi
379	August 16	1913 Songjeong Station Market, Gwangju	The Reason I'm Solo	Music Video Scene Quiz	Im Woo-il, Wooyoung (2PM), Jeon Somi
379	August 16	1913 Songjeong Station Market, Gwangju	The Reason I'm Solo	Turtles - Sing Lala	Im Woo-il, Wooyoung (2PM), Jeon Somi
380	August 23	Ahyeon Market, Seoul	Let's Be a Cool 40-Year-Old	Yang Se-chan (feat. Haha) - Kalla	Lee Seok-hoon (SG Wannabe), Yang Se-hyung
380	August 23	Ahyeon Market, Seoul	Let's Be a Cool 40-Year-Old	Hey A.I. Draw A Picture~	Lee Seok-hoon (SG Wannabe), Yang Se-hyung
380	August 23	Ahyeon Market, Seoul	Let's Be a Cool 40-Year-Old	SeeYa - His Voice	Lee Seok-hoon (SG Wannabe), Yang Se-hyung
381	August 30	Jeil Market, Bucheon	Amazing Icon	G-Dragon (BigBang) - What Do You Want?	Zerobaseone (Zhang Hao, Sung Han-bin, Han Yu-jin)
381	August 30	Jeil Market, Bucheon	Amazing Icon	Consonants Quiz (Korean Fried Chicken Brands)	Zerobaseone (Zhang Hao, Sung Han-bin, Han Yu-jin)
381	August 30	Jeil Market, Bucheon	Amazing Icon	Lucy - Unbelievable	Zerobaseone (Zhang Hao, Sung Han-bin, Han Yu-jin)
382	September 6	Cheongnyangni General Market, Seoul	Becoming a Band	English Speed Quiz (Variety Shows)	Day6
382	September 6	Cheongnyangni General Market, Seoul	Becoming a Band	10cm (feat. Big Naughty) - Monday Is Coming	Day6
382	September 6	Cheongnyangni General Market, Seoul	Becoming a Band	Oh~ Yeah~ Na~ Baby~ Quiz	Day6
383	September 13	Osaek/Five Colours Market, Osan	I'm Excited, I'm So Excited	Continue to Sing Quiz	Koyote
383	September 13	Osaek/Five Colours Market, Osan	I'm Excited, I'm So Excited	Young Turks Club - Love Designer	Koyote
383	September 13	Osaek/Five Colours Market, Osan	I'm Excited, I'm So Excited	Dialogue in the Square Quiz (Dramas, Movies)	Koyote
384	September 20	Suyu Traditional Market, Seoul	Boss War	Omniscient Dialogue View - Six United as One	Jo Woo-jin, Park Ji-hwan, Lee Kyu-hyung
384	September 20	Suyu Traditional Market, Seoul	Boss War	NCT U - 90's Love	Jo Woo-jin, Park Ji-hwan, Lee Kyu-hyung
384	September 20	Suyu Traditional Market, Seoul	Boss War	Consonants Quiz (Ramyeon)	Jo Woo-jin, Park Ji-hwan, Lee Kyu-hyung
385	September 27	Land Deposit Market, Incheon	Let's Live Kindly	Guess Them Right! AS Restaurant	Jeon Yeo-been, Jung Jin-young, Joo Hyun-young
385	September 27	Land Deposit Market, Incheon	Let's Live Kindly	2PM - Game Over	Jeon Yeo-been, Jung Jin-young, Joo Hyun-young
385	September 27	Land Deposit Market, Incheon	Let's Live Kindly	The Star's Childhood	Jeon Yeo-been, Jung Jin-young, Joo Hyun-young
386	October 4	Ichon General Market, Seoul	Men Who Get the Autumn Blues	Charades (Famous Drama Lines)	Lee Sang-jun, Zo Zazz, O3ohn
386	October 4	Ichon General Market, Seoul	Men Who Get the Autumn Blues	Gwana - Cute Is the Strongest	Lee Sang-jun, Zo Zazz, O3ohn
386	October 4	Ichon General Market, Seoul	Men Who Get the Autumn Blues	Your Eyes, Nose, Lips Quiz	Lee Sang-jun, Zo Zazz, O3ohn
387	October 11	Songchon Traditional Market, Daejeon	Death AS	Omniscient Dialogue View - Six United as One (Variety Program)	Kim Sung-kyu (Infinite), Sandeul (B1A4), Kim Min-seok (MeloMance)
387	October 11	Songchon Traditional Market, Daejeon	Death AS	Lee Chan-hyuk (AKMU) - Panorama	Kim Sung-kyu (Infinite), Sandeul (B1A4), Kim Min-seok (MeloMance)
387	October 11	Songchon Traditional Market, Daejeon	Death AS	Noraebang Accompaniment Quiz	Kim Sung-kyu (Infinite), Sandeul (B1A4), Kim Min-seok (MeloMance)
388	October 18	Ilsan Market, Goyang	AS Jewelry Box	Charades (Song Lyrics)	Myung Jae-hyun (BoyNextDoor), Wonhee (Illit), Bang Jee-min (Izna), Ian (Hearts2Hearts)
388	October 18	Ilsan Market, Goyang	AS Jewelry Box	Lee Young-ji (feat. Young Kay) - New History	Myung Jae-hyun (BoyNextDoor), Wonhee (Illit), Bang Jee-min (Izna), Ian (Hearts2Hearts)
388	October 18	Ilsan Market, Goyang	AS Jewelry Box	Consonants Quiz (Snack Brands)	Myung Jae-hyun (BoyNextDoor), Wonhee (Illit), Bang Jee-min (Izna), Ian (Hearts2Hearts)
389	October 25	Anseong Traditional Market, Anseong	Mister AS	Lyrics Reading Quiz - Six United as One	Baekho, Lee Chan-won, Hwang Yun-seong
389	October 25	Anseong Traditional Market, Anseong	Mister AS	KiiiKiii - Strawberry Cheesegame	Baekho, Lee Chan-won, Hwang Yun-seong
389	October 25	Anseong Traditional Market, Anseong	Mister AS	Hey A.I. Draw A Picture~	Baekho, Lee Chan-won, Hwang Yun-seong
390	November 1	Jeungsan General Market, Seoul	We Are Speed Racers!	English Speed Quiz (Proverb)	Park Joon-hyung (g.o.d), Kwak Beom, Jung Hyuk
390	November 1	Jeungsan General Market, Seoul	We Are Speed Racers!	Double Eight - Booster	Park Joon-hyung (g.o.d), Kwak Beom, Jung Hyuk
390	November 1	Jeungsan General Market, Seoul	We Are Speed Racers!	The Star's Childhood	Park Joon-hyung (g.o.d), Kwak Beom, Jung Hyuk
391	November 8	Masan Fish Market, Changwon	A Friend Who Is Like a Tonic	Voice Support Quiz - Six United as One	Heo Kyung-hwan, Shin Gi-ru, Seo Bum-june
391	November 8	Masan Fish Market, Changwon	A Friend Who Is Like a Tonic	Hamo Hamo - Pang Pang	Heo Kyung-hwan, Shin Gi-ru, Seo Bum-june
391	November 8	Masan Fish Market, Changwon	A Friend Who Is Like a Tonic	New/Old Neologism Quiz	Heo Kyung-hwan, Shin Gi-ru, Seo Bum-june
392	November 15	Seongnae Market, Seoul	Eardrum Boyfriends	Continue to Sing Quiz	K.Will, Choi Jung-hoon (Jannabi), Jung Seung-hwan
392	November 15	Seongnae Market, Seoul	Eardrum Boyfriends	Crying Nut - Tough Guy	K.Will, Choi Jung-hoon (Jannabi), Jung Seung-hwan
392	November 15	Seongnae Market, Seoul	Eardrum Boyfriends	Oh~ Woo~ Yeah~ Baby~ Quiz	K.Will, Choi Jung-hoon (Jannabi), Jung Seung-hwan
393	November 22	Jeongja Market, Suwon	Cal Cal What Cal? (Note: Korean word "컬")	I Can See Your Title (Korean Movies & Dramas) - Six United as One	Yoo Jun-sang, Lee Hong-gi (F.T. Island)
393	November 22	Jeongja Market, Suwon	Cal Cal What Cal?	Sung Si-kyung (feat. Kim Jin-pyo) - First Grade, First Class	Yoo Jun-sang, Lee Hong-gi (F.T. Island)
393	November 22	Jeongja Market, Suwon	Cal Cal What Cal?	Lyrics in the Square Quiz	Yoo Jun-sang, Lee Hong-gi (F.T. Island)
394	November 28	Baekun Market, Seoul	AS Information Source	Charades (Famous Drama Lines)	Heo Sung-tae, Kwaktube
394	November 28	Baekun Market, Seoul	AS Information Source	Le Sserafim (feat. J-Hope (BTS)) - Spaghetti	Heo Sung-tae, Kwaktube
394	November 28	Baekun Market, Seoul	AS Information Source	Doppelganger Quiz (Variety Shows)	Heo Sung-tae, Kwaktube
395	December 6	Hwangnam Market, Gyeongju	Confidentiality of the CEO	Continue to Sing Quiz	Song Eun-i, Shin Bong-sun
395	December 6	Hwangnam Market, Gyeongju	Confidentiality of the CEO	Hambuggy - Buggy Bounce	Song Eun-i, Shin Bong-sun
395	December 6	Hwangnam Market, Gyeongju	Confidentiality of the CEO	Dialogue in the Square Quiz (Dramas, Movies)	Song Eun-i, Shin Bong-sun
396	December 13	Jungbu Market, Seoul	2010's Dream Guy	Omniscient Dialogue View - Six United as One (Variety Program)	Daesung (BigBang), Seo Eun-kwang (BtoB), Roy Kim
396	December 13	Jungbu Market, Seoul	2010's Dream Guy	Nmixx - Blue Valentine	Daesung (BigBang), Seo Eun-kwang (BtoB), Roy Kim
396	December 13	Jungbu Market, Seoul	2010's Dream Guy	If It's the End Quiz	Daesung (BigBang), Seo Eun-kwang (BtoB), Roy Kim
397	December 20	Sinjang Market, Hanam	AS Jewelry Store	Charades (Movies, Dramas)	Kim Min-seok, Lee Sang-jin, Lee Joo-ahn, Yoon Seo-ah
397	December 20	Sinjang Market, Hanam	AS Jewelry Store	Balming Tiger (feat. RM (BTS)) - Sexy Nukim	Kim Min-seok, Lee Sang-jin, Lee Joo-ahn, Yoon Seo-ah
397	December 20	Sinjang Market, Hanam	AS Jewelry Store	Consonants Quiz (Hamburger)	Kim Min-seok, Lee Sang-jin, Lee Joo-ahn, Yoon Seo-ah
398	December 27	Gangnam Gaepo Market, Seoul	99z Christmas	Charades (Song Title)	Dayoung (WJSN), Chuu, Lee Chae-yeon
398	December 27	Gangnam Gaepo Market, Seoul	99z Christmas	Choi Ye-na (feat. Miryo (Brown Eyed Girls)) - Anyone But You	Dayoung (WJSN), Chuu, Lee Chae-yeon
398	December 27	Gangnam Gaepo Market, Seoul	99z Christmas	Fashion King on Stage	Dayoung (WJSN), Chuu, Lee Chae-yeon

== Episodes (2026) ==
List of episodes in 2026 (episode 399-present)

Ep.	Air Date	Featured Market	Dressing Theme Concept	Song Question + Appetizer & Dessert Time Games	Guest(s)
399	January 3	Daesong Market, Ulsan	New Year Special - 2026 is Insanely Good	New/Old OST Quiz (Dramas, Movies) - Five United as One	Hong Seok-cheon, Kim Ddol-ddol
399	January 3	Daesong Market, Ulsan	New Year Special - 2026 is Insanely Good	U-KISS - Man Man Ha Ni	Hong Seok-cheon, Kim Ddol-ddol
399	January 3	Daesong Market, Ulsan	New Year Special - 2026 is Insanely Good	Hey A.I. Draw A Picture~	Hong Seok-cheon, Kim Ddol-ddol
400	January 10	Suyu Traditional Market, Seoul; Hwajeong Western Market, Gwangju; Central Market, Seoul	400th Episode Special - Sparkling Sparkling Saturday	Continue to Sing Quiz	Heo Kyung-hwan, Hyoyeon (Girls' Generation), Rei (Ive), Wonhee (Illit)
400	January 10	Suyu Traditional Market, Seoul; Hwajeong Western Market, Gwangju; Central Market, Seoul	400th Episode Special - Sparkling Sparkling Saturday	TWS - Countdown!	Heo Kyung-hwan, Hyoyeon (Girls' Generation), Rei (Ive), Wonhee (Illit)
400	January 10	Suyu Traditional Market, Seoul; Hwajeong Western Market, Gwangju; Central Market, Seoul	400th Episode Special - Sparkling Sparkling Saturday	Lyrics in the Square Quiz	Heo Kyung-hwan, Hyoyeon (Girls' Generation), Rei (Ive), Wonhee (Illit)
401	January 17	Bupyeong Total Market, Incheon	AS Drive	Stray Kids - Ceremony	Alpha Drive One (Note: Only Junseo, Leo, Sangwon, and Xinlong participated in the Song Dictation segment. The remaining members would subsequently appear in the Snack Time segment.)
401	January 17	Bupyeong Total Market, Incheon	AS Drive	Consonants Quiz (Songs); Who Is Today's Ending Fairy?	Alpha Drive One
402	January 24	Yeonseo Market, Seoul	So So What So (Note: Korean word "소")	Continue to Sing Quiz	Exo (Suho, Chanyeol)
402	January 24	Yeonseo Market, Seoul	So So What So	Ateez - Crazy Form	Exo (Suho, Chanyeol)
402	January 24	Yeonseo Market, Seoul	So So What So	The Star's Childhood	Exo (Suho, Chanyeol)
403	January 31	Moonchang Market, Daejeon	Amazing Brain	What's Your Name? (Nostalgic Snacks) - Five United as One	Hwang Je-sung, Orbit, Lee Hye-sung
403	January 31	Moonchang Market, Daejeon	Amazing Brain	NRG - See You at the Top	Hwang Je-sung, Orbit, Lee Hye-sung
403	January 31	Moonchang Market, Daejeon	Amazing Brain	New/Old Neologism Quiz	Hwang Je-sung, Orbit, Lee Hye-sung
404	February 7	Mok Sarang Market, Seoul	End-Of-The-Century Office Workers	Omniscient Dialogue View - Five United as One	Park Shin-hye, Ko Kyung-pyo, Ha Yoon-kyung
404	February 7	Mok Sarang Market, Seoul	End-Of-The-Century Office Workers	Itzy - #Twenty	Park Shin-hye, Ko Kyung-pyo, Ha Yoon-kyung
404	February 7	Mok Sarang Market, Seoul	End-Of-The-Century Office Workers	Lyrics Feeling Drama Quiz	Park Shin-hye, Ko Kyung-pyo, Ha Yoon-kyung
405	February 14	Traditional Market, Gwangmyeong	Saturday is Pinky Pinky	English Speed Quiz (Catchphrase)	Apink (Park Cho-rong, Yoon Bo-mi, Jung Eun-ji)
405	February 14	Traditional Market, Gwangmyeong	Saturday is Pinky Pinky	BtoB 90Tan - Tang Tang Tang	Apink (Park Cho-rong, Yoon Bo-mi, Jung Eun-ji)
405	February 14	Traditional Market, Gwangmyeong	Saturday is Pinky Pinky	Interlude Jump Quiz	Apink (Park Cho-rong, Yoon Bo-mi, Jung Eun-ji)
406	February 21	Jayang Han River Traditional Market, Seoul	A Feast Has Opened	Charades (Movie Title)	Shin Gi-ru, Lee Yong-jin, Lee Jae-youl
406	February 21	Jayang Han River Traditional Market, Seoul	A Feast Has Opened	Park Myung-soo, So Chan-whee - Fool	Shin Gi-ru, Lee Yong-jin, Lee Jae-youl
406	February 21	Jayang Han River Traditional Market, Seoul	A Feast Has Opened	Consonants Quiz (Drinks Brands)	Shin Gi-ru, Lee Yong-jin, Lee Jae-youl
407	February 28	East Sea Central Market, Donghae	Z Z What Z (Note: Korean word "즈")	Continue to Sing Quiz	Woodz, Zo Zazz
407	February 28	East Sea Central Market, Donghae	Z Z What Z	Riize - Bag Bad Back	Woodz, Zo Zazz
407	February 28	East Sea Central Market, Donghae	Z Z What Z	Oh~ Woo~ Yeah~ Na~ Quiz	Woodz, Zo Zazz
408 (Note: Due to the broadcast of the 2026 World Baseball Classic South Korea vs. Japan match, this episode aired a week later than its original date.)	March 14	Bongcheon Jeil General Market, Seoul	Amazing Duo Survival Match	Charades (Drama Title)	Im Woo-il, Kim Ji-yu, NCT (Jeno, Jaemin) (Note: Promoting as a sub-unit of the group, NCT JNJM.)
408	March 14	Bongcheon Jeil General Market, Seoul	Amazing Duo Survival Match	Monsta X - Stand Together	Im Woo-il, Kim Ji-yu, NCT (Jeno, Jaemin)
408	March 14	Bongcheon Jeil General Market, Seoul	Amazing Duo Survival Match	Lyrics in the Square Quiz	Im Woo-il, Kim Ji-yu, NCT (Jeno, Jaemin)
409	March 21	Geumchon Tongil Market, Paju	Gather Up! Dance Club	Continue to Sing Quiz	Choi Ye-na, Lee Chae-yeon, Chaeryeong (Itzy)
409	March 21	Geumchon Tongil Market, Paju	Gather Up! Dance Club	Kan Mi-youn (feat. Mir (MBLAQ)) - Crazy	Choi Ye-na, Lee Chae-yeon, Chaeryeong (Itzy)
409	March 21	Geumchon Tongil Market, Paju	Gather Up! Dance Club	Music Video Scene Quiz	Choi Ye-na, Lee Chae-yeon, Chaeryeong (Itzy)
410	March 28	Starlight Nammun Market, Seoul	Blow, Spring Breeze	Continue to Sing Quiz	Tomorrow X Together (Yeonjun, Soobin, Beomgyu)
410	March 28	Starlight Nammun Market, Seoul	Blow, Spring Breeze	Day6 - 121U	Tomorrow X Together (Yeonjun, Soobin, Beomgyu)
410	March 28	Starlight Nammun Market, Seoul	Blow, Spring Breeze	Hey A.I. Draw A Picture~	Tomorrow X Together (Yeonjun, Soobin, Beomgyu)
411	April 4	Gyeongdong Market, Seoul	8th Anniversary Special - Forever Energetic Saturday	J.Y. Park - Still Alive (Note: Escape order: Kim Dong-hyun, Young K, Taeyeon, Hanhae, Moon Se-yoon, Nucksal, Shin Dong-yup, P.O.)	Kim Mi-ryeong (Note: Chef and Culinary Class Wars contestant, act as the food provider.)
411	April 4	Gyeongdong Market, Seoul	8th Anniversary Special - Forever Energetic Saturday	Relay Song Dictation: (Note: The song dictation is played as a relay song dictation. The cast members are split into 2 teams. Three people from each team must note down the part of the lyrics that is divided into three lines within 3 seconds for each person while one person from each team, who is wearing headphones, must guess the singer and title of the song correctly by looking at the written lyrics. The team that guesses correctly wins a point, and the team that earns 4 points first gets to eat.) (Note: For this episode, the 2 teams are: Team Kim Dong-hyun (Kim Dong-hyun, Moon Se-yoon, Nucksal, Taeyeon), and Team Young K (Young K, Shin Dong-yup, Hanhae, P.O). Team Young K won against Team Kim Dong-hyun, with the final result being 4:3.); Park Sang-chul - Unconditionally; Kim Yon-ja - Amor Fati; BigBang - Sunset Glow; Kim Gun-mo - Wrongful Meeting; Aespa - Supernova; Busker Busker - Cherry Blossom Ending; Psy - Entertainer	Kim Mi-ryeong
411	April 4	Gyeongdong Market, Seoul	8th Anniversary Special - Forever Energetic Saturday	Noraebang Accompaniment Quiz	Kim Mi-ryeong
412	April 11	Onyang Hot Spring Market, Asan	Saturday Horror Story	Omniscient Dialogue View - Five United as One	Kim Jun-han, Kim Hye-yoon, Hyoyeon (Girls' Generation) (Note: Standing in for Young K)
412	April 11	Onyang Hot Spring Market, Asan	Saturday Horror Story	Monday Kiz (feat. Rhymer) - Shout With Your Heart	Kim Jun-han, Kim Hye-yoon, Hyoyeon (Girls' Generation)
412	April 11	Onyang Hot Spring Market, Asan	Saturday Horror Story	Consonants Quiz (Ramyeon)	Kim Jun-han, Kim Hye-yoon, Hyoyeon (Girls' Generation)
413	April 18	Solsaem Market, Seoul	Sangam-dong Friends	Continue to Sing Quiz	Choi Daniel, Jang Keun-suk, Ahn Jae-hyun, Kyung Soo-jin
413	April 18	Solsaem Market, Seoul	Sangam-dong Friends	AB6IX - Lululala	Choi Daniel, Jang Keun-suk, Ahn Jae-hyun, Kyung Soo-jin
413	April 18	Solsaem Market, Seoul	Sangam-dong Friends	Guess It Guess It! Friends	Choi Daniel, Jang Keun-suk, Ahn Jae-hyun, Kyung Soo-jin
414	April 25	Yeokjeon Market, Gunpo	The 2nd AS Jewelry Box	If It's the End Quiz - Five United as One	Dohoon (TWS), Sion (NCT), Kyehoon (KickFlip), Kya (KiiiKiii)
414	April 25	Yeokjeon Market, Gunpo	The 2nd AS Jewelry Box	Sechs Kies - Persevere	Dohoon (TWS), Sion (NCT), Kyehoon (KickFlip), Kya (KiiiKiii)
414	April 25	Yeokjeon Market, Gunpo	The 2nd AS Jewelry Box	Consonants Quiz (Songs)	Dohoon (TWS), Sion (NCT), Kyehoon (KickFlip), Kya (KiiiKiii)
415	May 2	Sagajeong Market, Seoul	AS Language School	Continue to Sing Quiz	Kangnam, Jonathan Yiombi, Lily (Nmixx), Wonhee (Illit)
415	May 2	Sagajeong Market, Seoul	AS Language School	BigBang - Lady	Kangnam, Jonathan Yiombi, Lily (Nmixx), Wonhee (Illit)
415	May 2	Sagajeong Market, Seoul	AS Language School	The Star's Childhood	Kangnam, Jonathan Yiombi, Lily (Nmixx), Wonhee (Illit)
416	May 9	Sinmae Market, Daegu	Romance Is So~ Nice	Relay Song Dictation	Yang Sang-guk, Kim Hae-jun, Na Bo-ram
416	May 9	Sinmae Market, Daegu	Romance Is So~ Nice	Teen Top - Supa Luv	Yang Sang-guk, Kim Hae-jun, Na Bo-ram
416	May 9	Sinmae Market, Daegu	Romance Is So~ Nice	Voice Support Quiz (Dramas, Movies)	Yang Sang-guk, Kim Hae-jun, Na Bo-ram
417	May 16	Sangdo Traditional Market, Seoul	Buddy Buddy Best Buddy	Noraebang Accompaniment Quiz - Six United as One	Nmixx (Haewon, Bae), Le Sserafim (Kim Chae-won, Kazuha)
417	May 16	Sangdo Traditional Market, Seoul	Buddy Buddy Best Buddy	Son Dam-bi, After School - Amoled	Nmixx (Haewon, Bae), Le Sserafim (Kim Chae-won, Kazuha)
417	May 16	Sangdo Traditional Market, Seoul	Buddy Buddy Best Buddy	Consonants Quiz (Snack Brands)	Nmixx (Haewon, Bae), Le Sserafim (Kim Chae-won, Kazuha)
418	May 23	Bongseon Market, Gwangju	Amazing Kid	Continue to Sing Quiz	I.O.I (Kim Se-jeong, Kim So-hye, Jeon Somi)
418	May 23	Bongseon Market, Gwangju	Amazing Kid	Jewelry - Hot & Cold	I.O.I (Kim Se-jeong, Kim So-hye, Jeon Somi)
418	May 23	Bongseon Market, Gwangju	Amazing Kid	Guess The Debut Song	I.O.I (Kim Se-jeong, Kim So-hye, Jeon Somi)
419	May 30	Ssangmun Market, Seoul	Strange Shops	Omniscient Dialogue View - Five United as One	Ra Mi-ran, Lee Re
419	May 30	Ssangmun Market, Seoul	Strange Shops	Hockee - Sunday	Ra Mi-ran, Lee Re
419	May 30	Ssangmun Market, Seoul	Strange Shops	Lyrics in the Square Quiz	Ra Mi-ran, Lee Re
420	June 6	Western Market, Taean	Gym Boy Gym Girl	Continue to Sing Quiz	Jo Hye-ryun, Rhymer, Dayoung (WJSN)
420	June 6	Western Market, Taean	Gym Boy Gym Girl	Cortis - RedRed	Jo Hye-ryun, Rhymer, Dayoung (WJSN)
420	June 6	Western Market, Taean	Gym Boy Gym Girl	Song Narration Quiz	Jo Hye-ryun, Rhymer, Dayoung (WJSN)
421	June 13	Yongdap Nadeul Market, Seoul	Husband by My Side	I Can See Your Title (Movies & Dramas) - Six United as One	Kim Ji-seok, Lee Da-hee, Kang Han-na, Gong Myung
421	June 13	Yongdap Nadeul Market, Seoul	Husband by My Side	T-ara - Why Are You Being Like This?	Kim Ji-seok, Lee Da-hee, Kang Han-na, Gong Myung
421	June 13	Yongdap Nadeul Market, Seoul	Husband by My Side	Lyrics Feeling Drama Quiz	Kim Ji-seok, Lee Da-hee, Kang Han-na, Gong Myung
422	June 20	North Suwon Market, Suwon	Buddy Buddy Best Buddy 2	Charades (Song Title)	BoyNextDoor (Sungho, Woonhak), Riize (Sungchan, Wonbin)
422	June 20	North Suwon Market, Suwon	Buddy Buddy Best Buddy 2	BigBang - Monster	BoyNextDoor (Sungho, Woonhak), Riize (Sungchan, Wonbin)
422	June 20	North Suwon Market, Suwon	Buddy Buddy Best Buddy 2	Dialect Tour	BoyNextDoor (Sungho, Woonhak), Riize (Sungchan, Wonbin)
423	June 27	Hwagok Bondong Market, Seoul	No Overtime Yes Go Off Work!	Oh~ Woo~ Yeah~ Na~ Quiz - Five United as One	Seo In-guk, Kang Mi-na
423	June 27	Hwagok Bondong Market, Seoul	No Overtime Yes Go Off Work!	BLSG - Pay Me	Seo In-guk, Kang Mi-na
423	June 27	Hwagok Bondong Market, Seoul	No Overtime Yes Go Off Work!	Doppelganger Quiz (Actors/Actresses)	Seo In-guk, Kang Mi-na
424	July 4	Goejeong Alley Market, Busan	Click 1999	Charades (Variety & Culture Program)	Click-B (Oh Jong-hyuk, Kim Sang-hyuk, Yoo Ho-suk)
424	July 4	Goejeong Alley Market, Busan	Click 1999	Lucy - Watermelon	Click-B (Oh Jong-hyuk, Kim Sang-hyuk, Yoo Ho-suk)
424	July 4	Goejeong Alley Market, Busan	Click 1999	The Star's Childhood	Click-B (Oh Jong-hyuk, Kim Sang-hyuk, Yoo Ho-suk)
425	July 11	Myeongil Traditional Market, Seoul	Spooky Saturday	Continue to Sing Quiz	Park Eun-bin, Yang Se-jong, Ong Seong-wu
425	July 11	Myeongil Traditional Market, Seoul	Spooky Saturday	Taeyang (BigBang) - Live Fast Die Slow	Park Eun-bin, Yang Se-jong, Ong Seong-wu
425	July 11	Myeongil Traditional Market, Seoul	Spooky Saturday	A Ghost Appeared!	Park Eun-bin, Yang Se-jong, Ong Seong-wu
426	July 18	Dongsang Market, Gimhae	2010's Cells	Charades (Movie, Drama & Musical)	Sunmi, Tiffany Young (Girls' Generation), Leo (VIXX)
426	July 18	Dongsang Market, Gimhae	2010's Cells	So Ji-sub (feat. Han Kyung-mi) - Corona Borealis	Sunmi, Tiffany Young (Girls' Generation), Leo (VIXX)
426	July 18	Dongsang Market, Gimhae	2010's Cells	Hey A.I. Draw A Picture~	Sunmi, Tiffany Young (Girls' Generation), Leo (VIXX)
427	July 25	Hanshin Market, Bucheon	Who's Your Bias?	Pictionary (Song Title)	Kang Hoon, Kim Hye-jun, Kim Ah-young
427	July 25	Hanshin Market, Bucheon	Who's Your Bias?	TNX - My Bias	Kang Hoon, Kim Hye-jun, Kim Ah-young
427	July 25	Hanshin Market, Bucheon	Who's Your Bias?	What's Your Name? (Objects)	Kang Hoon, Kim Hye-jun, Kim Ah-young
428	August 1	Utjang Market, Suncheon	Unbalanced Couple	Tell Me Line by Line Tell Me (Movie & Drama)	Heo Sung-tae, Jung Hae-in, Ha Young
428	August 1	Utjang Market, Suncheon	Unbalanced Couple	N.Flying - 4242	Heo Sung-tae, Jung Hae-in, Ha Young
428	August 1	Utjang Market, Suncheon	Unbalanced Couple	Guess It Right Love Scene	Heo Sung-tae, Jung Hae-in, Ha Young
429 (Note: Special appearance by Tyron Woodley as a special correspondent via VCR.)	August 8	Mangwon World Cup Market, Seoul	Cruise Trip Okay?	I'm a Person Like This! Quiz	Uhm Jung-hwa, Park Sung-woong, Ryeoun
429	August 8	Mangwon World Cup Market, Seoul	Cruise Trip Okay?	Speed Team Dictation Songs: (Note: The 2 teams are: Team Yellow (Shin Dong-yup, Kim Dong-hyun, Nucksal, Young K, Ryeoun), and Team Blue (Moon Se-yoon, Taeyeon, Hanhae, Uhm Jung-hwa, Park Sung-woong). Team Blue won 3:2 against Team Yellow.); Illit - It's Me; Pearl Sisters - A Cup of Coffee; Block B - Yesterday; Crush (feat. J-Hope (BTS)) - Rush Hour; Super Junior-H - Cooking? Cooking!	Uhm Jung-hwa, Park Sung-woong, Ryeoun
429	August 8	Mangwon World Cup Market, Seoul	Cruise Trip Okay?	Guess It Right Crime Scene	Uhm Jung-hwa, Park Sung-woong, Ryeoun
430	August 15	Songtan Market, Pyeongtaek	Princesses, Gather Up!	I'm a Person Like This! Quiz	Rescene (Woni, Liv, Zena)
430	August 15	Songtan Market, Pyeongtaek	Princesses, Gather Up!	Speed Team Dictation Songs: (Note: The 2 teams are: Team Yellow (Shin Dong-yup, Nucksal, Hanhae, Young K, Liv), and Team Blue (Kim Dong-hyun, Moon Se-yoon, Taeyeon, Woni, Zena). Team Yellow won 3:2 against Team Blue.); AKMU - Is It Ramen; AOA - Like a Cat; Park Mi-kyung - Eve’s Warning; Choi Ye-na - Catch Catch; Ha Chun-hwa - Sweet 18	Rescene (Woni, Liv, Zena)
430	August 15	Songtan Market, Pyeongtaek	Princesses, Gather Up!	Fashion King on Stage	Rescene (Woni, Liv, Zena)
Ep.	Air Date	Featured Chef (Note: Preparer of the 3-course meal dishes.)	Dressing Theme Concept	Song Question + Appetizer & Dessert Time Games	Guest(s)
431	August 22	Ha Jeong-suk	AS Grand Opening	Pictionary (Book Title)	Alpha Drive One (Leo, Sangwon, Xinlong)
431	August 22	Ha Jeong-suk	AS Grand Opening	Speed Team Dictation Songs: (Note: The 2 teams are: Team Yellow (Shin Dong-yup, Moon Se-yoon, Nucksal, Hanhae, Young K, Xinlong), and Team Blue (Kim Dong-hyun, Taeyeon, P.O, Leo, Sangwon). Team Yellow won 3:0 against Team Blue.); Buck - Barefoot Youth; Seo In-young - Cinderella; BoyNextDoor - Viral	Alpha Drive One (Leo, Sangwon, Xinlong)
431	August 22	Ha Jeong-suk	AS Grand Opening	Consonants Quiz (Ice Cream Brands)	Alpha Drive One (Leo, Sangwon, Xinlong)
432	August 29	Fabrizio Ferrari	Amazing Geniuses	I'm a Person Like This! Quiz	Hong Jin-ho, Mimi (Oh My Girl)
432	August 29	Fabrizio Ferrari	Amazing Geniuses	Speed Team Dictation Songs: (Note: The 2 teams are: Team Yellow (Shin Dong-yup, Moon Se-yoon, P.O, Young K, Mimi), and Team Blue (Kim Dong-hyun, Nucksal, Taeyeon, Hanhae, Hong Jin-ho). Team Blue won 3:2 against Team Yellow.); Secret - Shy Boy; Woodz - Drowning; Hyun Sook - From Friend to Lover; Eun Ji-won (feat. Lee Soo-geun) - 160; Eugene - Cha Cha	Hong Jin-ho, Mimi (Oh My Girl)
432	August 29	Fabrizio Ferrari	Amazing Geniuses	Dialogue in the Square Quiz (Dramas, Movies)	Hong Jin-ho, Mimi (Oh My Girl)
433	September 5	Kim Do-yun	Gwang Gwang What Gwang? (Note: Korean word "광")	I'm a Person Like This! Quiz	Ryu Seung-ryong, Kim Si-a
433	September 5	Kim Do-yun	Gwang Gwang What Gwang?	Speed Team Dictation Songs: (Note: The 2 teams are: Team Yellow (Shin Dong-yup, Kim Dong-hyun, Moon Se-yoon, Nucksal, P.O), and Team Blue (Taeyeon, Hanhae, Young K, Ryu Seung-ryong, Kim Si-a). Team Yellow won 2:1 against Team Blue.); Yeonjun (Tomorrow X Together) - Ice Cream; Sistar - Alone; Jun Young-ho - Butter-Fly	Ryu Seung-ryong, Kim Si-a
433	September 5	Kim Do-yun	Gwang Gwang What Gwang?	The Star's Childhood	Ryu Seung-ryong, Kim Si-a
434	September 12	Cho Hyun-ji	010-We Are-7942 (Note: 7942 in Korean sound similar to friends (친구사이).)	I'm a Person Like This! Quiz	Zo Zazz, Kim Kyu-won, Wonpil (Day6)
434	September 12	Cho Hyun-ji	010-We Are-7942	Speed Team Dictation Songs: (Note: The 2 teams are: Team Yellow (Kim Dong-hyun, Nucksal, Taeyeon, P.O, Young K), and Team Blue (Shin Dong-yup, Moon Se-yoon, Hanhae, Zo Zazz, Kim Kyu-won, Wonpil). Team Blue won 2:1 against Team Yellow.); T-ara & Supernova - TTL (Time to Love); So Chan-whee - Hold Me Now; Ateez - Bad	Zo Zazz, Kim Kyu-won, Wonpil (Day6)
434	September 12	Cho Hyun-ji	010-We Are-7942	If It's the End Quiz	Zo Zazz, Kim Kyu-won, Wonpil (Day6)
435	September 19	Kim Si-hyeon	Hangawi Annual Leave	Continue to Sing Quiz	Young Tak, Lee Seok-hoon (SG Wannabe), Seo Eun-kwang (BtoB)
435	September 19	Kim Si-hyeon	Hangawi Annual Leave	Speed Team Dictation Songs: (Note: The 2 teams are: Team Yellow (Shin Dong-yup, Kim Dong-hyun, Nucksal, Hanhae, Young K, Seo Eun-kwang), and Team Blue (Moon Se-yoon, Moon Se-yoon, Taeyeon, P.O, Young Tak, Lee Seok-hoon). Team Yellow won 2:0 against Team Blue.); Na Hoon-a - Gijang's Seagull; Choi Ye-na (feat. Bibi) - Smiley	Young Tak, Lee Seok-hoon (SG Wannabe), Seo Eun-kwang (BtoB)
435	September 19	Kim Si-hyeon	Hangawi Annual Leave	Music Video Scene Quiz	Young Tak, Lee Seok-hoon (SG Wannabe), Seo Eun-kwang (BtoB)
436 (Note: Due to special broadcast arrangement, this episode aired earlier at 18:00 (KST).)	October 3	Lee Soon-sil	National Foundation Day (Comedy Geniuses' Verse)	Omniscient Dialogue View - Five United as One	Shin Gi-ru, Kim Ji-yu
436	October 3	Lee Soon-sil	National Foundation Day (Comedy Geniuses' Verse)	Speed Team Dictation Songs: (Note: The 2 teams are: Team Yellow (Shin Dong-yup, Moon Se-yoon, Nucksal, P.O, Young K) and Team Blue (Kim Dong-hyun, Taeyeon, Hanhae, Shin Gi-ru, Kim Ji-yu). Team Yellow won 2:1 against Team Blue.); Gain (Brown Eyed Girls) - Bloom; 1TYM - One Love; Psy - Spit It Out	Shin Gi-ru, Kim Ji-yu
436	October 3	Lee Soon-sil	National Foundation Day (Comedy Geniuses' Verse)	Consonants Quiz (Korean Fried Chicken Brands)	Shin Gi-ru, Kim Ji-yu
437	October 10	Choi Sang-hyun	All!mazing Saturday	Charades (Song Title)	AllDay Project
437	October 10	Choi Sang-hyun	All!mazing Saturday	Speed Team Dictation Songs: (Note: The 2 teams are: OldDay Project (Shin Dong-yup, Kim Dong-hyun, Moon Se-yoon, Taeyeon, P.O, Young K) and YoungDay Project (AllDay Project, Nucksal, Hanhae). Team YoungDay Project won 2:1 against Team OldDay Project.); 2PM - Go Crazy! Epik High (feat. Ji-sun (Loveholics)) - Paris; 2NE1 - Clap Your Hands	AllDay Project
437	October 10	Choi Sang-hyun	All!mazing Saturday	Lyrics in the Square Quiz	AllDay Project
438	October 17	Kim Cha-kyung	South Korean Foreigners Idol	Continue to Sing Quiz	Park Joon-hyung (g.o.d), Brian Joo (Fly to the Sky), Tsuki (Billlie)
438	October 17	Kim Cha-kyung	South Korean Foreigners Idol	Speed Team Dictation Songs: (Note: The 2 teams are: Team Yellow (Shin Dong-yup, Kim Dong-hyun, Taeyeon, P.O, Park Joon-hyung, Tsuki) and Team Blue (Moon Se-yoon, Nucksal, Hanhae, Young K, Brian Joo). Team Yellow won 2:0 against Team Blue.); The Jadu - Let's Play; Got7 - Good	Park Joon-hyung (g.o.d), Brian Joo (Fly to the Sky), Tsuki (Billlie)
438	October 17	Kim Cha-kyung	South Korean Foreigners Idol	Dialogue in the Square Quiz	Park Joon-hyung (g.o.d), Brian Joo (Fly to the Sky), Tsuki (Billlie)
439	October 24	Nakamura Koji	Street AS Fighter	Charades (Variety & Culture Program)	Bada Lee, Simeez, Ingyoo
439	October 24	Nakamura Koji	Street AS Fighter	Speed Team Dictation Songs: (Note: The 2 teams are: Team Yellow (Shin Dong-yup, Moon Se-yoon, Hanhae, P.O, Bada Lee, Ingyoo) and Team Blue (Kim Dong-hyun, Nucksal, Taeyeon, Young K, Simeez). Both teams won with a result of 2:2.) g.o.d - Report To The Dance Floor; Girls' Generation-HRS - Skibidi; Pororo Sing-a-Long - Para Pam	Bada Lee, Simeez, Ingyoo
439	October 24	Nakamura Koji	Street AS Fighter	Choreography Décalcomanie Quiz	Bada Lee, Simeez, Ingyoo
440	October 31	Yoon Dae-hyun, Kim Hee-eun	2026 Match Made in Heaven	What's Your Name? (Snacks) - Six United as One	Nmixx (Lily, Sullyoon), Illit (Yunah, Wonhee)
440	October 31	Yoon Dae-hyun, Kim Hee-eun	2026 Match Made in Heaven	Speed Team Dictation Songs: (Note: The 2 teams are: Team Yellow (Taeyeon, Hanhae, P.O, Young K, Yunah, Wonhee) and Team Blue (Shin Dong-yup, Kim Dong-hyun, Moon Se-yoon, Nucksal, Lily, Sullyoon). Team Yellow won 2:0 against Team Blue.); Lee Hyori (feat. Rhymer) - Hey Girl; Venny - You Just Hate Me for No Reason	Nmixx (Lily, Sullyoon), Illit (Yunah, Wonhee)
440	October 31	Yoon Dae-hyun, Kim Hee-eun	2026 Match Made in Heaven	Oh~ Yeah~ Na~ Come On! Quiz	Nmixx (Lily, Sullyoon), Illit (Yunah, Wonhee)
441	November 7	Kim Jeong-ae, Jeong Hee-yun	Something Happened in Palace	Continue to Sing Quiz	Kim Eung-soo, Swings, Chuu
441	November 7	Kim Jeong-ae, Jeong Hee-yun	Something Happened in Palace	Speed Team Dictation Songs: (Note: The 2 teams are: Team Yellow (Kim Dong-hyun, Moon Se-yoon, Taeyeon, Hanhae, P.O, Kim Eung-soo), and Team Blue (Shin Dong-yup, Nucksal, Young K, Swings, Chuu). Team Blue won 2:1 against Team Yellow.); Cho Yong-pil - Can't Find You; BigBang - Dirty Cash; Young Tak - Chatter	Kim Eung-soo, Swings, Chuu
441	November 7	Kim Jeong-ae, Jeong Hee-yun	Something Happened in Palace	Omniscient Dialogue View (Dramas and Movies)	Kim Eung-soo, Swings, Chuu
442	November 14	Kim Do-yun	What Happened on CSAT Day	Continue to Sing Quiz	Kyuhyun (Super Junior), Orbit, Mimiminu
442	November 14	Kim Do-yun	What Happened on CSAT Day	Speed Team Dictation Songs: (Note: The 2 teams are: Team Yellow (Shin Dong-yup, Kim Dong-hyun, Nucksal, Young K, Kyuhyun, Orbit), and Team Blue (Moon Se-yoon, Taeyeon, Hanhae, P.O, Mimiminu). Team Blue won 2:0 against Team Yellow.); BigBang - Last Farewell; Giriboy (feat. Big Naughty) - Eul	Kyuhyun (Super Junior), Orbit, Mimiminu
442	November 14	Kim Do-yun	What Happened on CSAT Day	Abbreviation Quiz (Webtoons and Web Novels)	Kyuhyun (Super Junior), Orbit, Mimiminu
443	November 21	Jang Min-hye, Lee Jae-young	Highway Romance	Tell Me Line by Line Tell Me (Movie & Drama)	Lee Min-ki, Kwak Sun-young
443	November 21	Jang Min-hye, Lee Jae-young	Highway Romance	Speed Team Dictation Songs: (Note: The 2 teams are: Team Yellow (Kim Dong-hyun, Taeyeon, Hanhae, P.O, Kwak Sun-young), and Team Blue (Shin Dong-yup, Moon Se-yoon, Nucksal, Young K, Lee Min-ki). Team Blue won 2:0 against Team Yellow.); Kim Young-chul - Signal Light; 4Minute - Whatcha Doin' Today	Lee Min-ki, Kwak Sun-young
443	November 21	Jang Min-hye, Lee Jae-young	Highway Romance	Consonants Quiz (Drinks Brands)	Lee Min-ki, Kwak Sun-young
443	November 28	TBA	Right Now, It's Ice Age	Omniscient Ment View - Five United as One	Keum Sae-rok, Seol In-ah, Han Ji-hyun, Yeonwoo
443	November 28	TBA	Right Now, It's Ice Age	Speed Team Dictation Songs: TBA - TBA; TBA - TBA; TBA - TBA	Keum Sae-rok, Seol In-ah, Han Ji-hyun, Yeonwoo
443	November 28	TBA	Right Now, It's Ice Age	Guess It Right Love Scene	Keum Sae-rok, Seol In-ah, Han Ji-hyun, Yeonwoo
