= List of markets in South Korea =

Major cities in South Korea typically have several traditional markets, each with vendors selling a wide variety of goods including fruit, vegetables, meat, fish, breads, clothing, textiles, handicrafts, souvenirs, and Korean traditional medicinal items. The Korean word for market is sijang (Korean: 시장) and traditional street markets are called jaerae sijang (Korean: 재래시장) or jeontong sijang (Korean: 전통시장). The market space commonly includes permanent restaurants, pop-up restaurants and food stalls (pojangmacha, Korean: 포장마차, lit. 'covered wagon') that sell traditional Korean cuisine and street food. The Small Enterprise and Market Service (Korean: 소상공인시장진흥공단; previously the Agency for Traditional Market Administration) is responsible for improving the condition of the country's traditional markets with the goal of developing them into prominent tourist attractions.

== List ==
The following is a list of retail and wholesale markets in South Korea. The list can contain many different types of markets including street markets, fish markets, farmers' markets, flea markets, and antique markets.

Name	Hangul	Image	City	Coordinates	Type	Notes
Bangsan Market	방산시장		Seoul	37.567°N 126.999°E	Street market	
Busan Cooperative Fish Market	부산공동어시장		Busan	35.088°N 129.025°E	Fish market	
Busanjin Market	부산진시장		Busan	35.1364°N 129.0587°E	Indoor market	
Daemyeong Market	대명시장		Seoul	37.455°N 126.902°E	Street market	
Daesong Agricultural Market	대송농수산물시장		Ulsan	35.499°N 129.421°E	Street market	
Dongdaemun Market	동대문시장		Seoul	37.570°N 127.009°E	Street market	Previously named: Baeugaejang (배우개장) then Gwangjang Market (광장시장)
Dongmyo Flea Market	동묘벼룩시장		Seoul		Flea market	
Eonyang Market	언양시장		Ulsan	35.564°N 129.126°E	Street market	
Garak Market	가락시장		Seoul	37.494°N 127.113°E	Fish market	
Gukje Market	국제시장		Busan	35.101°N 129.028°E	Street market	Also called Nampodong International Market
Gwangjang Market	광장시장		Seoul	37.570°N 126.999°E	Street market	Previously named Dongdaemun Market (동대문시장)
Gyeongdong Market	경동시장		Seoul	37.581°N 127.037°E	Traditional medicine	
Hwanghak-dong Flea Market	황학동 벼룩시장		Seoul	37.569°N 127.018°E	Flea market	Also called Dokkaebi Market (도깨비시장)
Jagalchi Market	자갈치시장		Busan	35.097°N 129.030°E	Fish market	
Jeju Dongmun Traditional Market	제주 동문재래시장		Jeju City	33.5122°N 126.5267°E	Street market	Oldest and largest in Jeju.
Namdaemun Market	남대문시장		Seoul	37.559°N 126.977°E	Street market	The oldest and largest street market in South Korea
Noryangjin Fisheries Wholesale Market	노량진수산시장		Seoul	37.515°N 126.941°E	Fish market	Previously named Gyeongseong Susan (경성수산)
Seogwipo Maeil Olle Market	서귀포매일올레시장		Seogwipo		Street market	Largest in Seogwipo
Seogwipo Rural Five-Day Market	서귀포시 향토 오일장		Seogwipo		Indoor market	Once every five days
Seomun Market	서문시장		Daegu	35.869°N 128.580°E	Street market	Largest street market in Daegu
Seongdong Market	성동시장		Gyeongju	35.845°N 129.216°E	Street market	Largest street market in Gyeongju
Sinjeong Market	신정시장		Ulsan	35.542°N 129.310°E	Street market	
Suam Market	수암시장		Ulsan	35.528°N 129.320°E	Street market	
Taehwa Comprehensive Market	태화종합시장		Ulsan	35.551°N 129.294°E	Street market	
Ulsan Central Market	울산중앙시장		Ulsan	35.554°N 129.323°E	Street market	Largest street market in Ulsan
Ulsan Lightning Market	울산번개시장		Ulsan	35.521°N 129.336°E	Street market	
Ulsan Wholesale Agricultural and Fish Market	울산 농수산물 도매시장		Ulsan	35.539°N 129.343°E	Fish & Produce market	
Wolbong Market	월봉시장		Ulsan	35.495°N 129.425°E	Street market	
Yaeum Market	야음시장		Ulsan	35.524°N 129.332°E	Street market	

== See also ==
- List of South Korean tourist attractions
- List of South Korean retail companies
- List of Korean dishes
