= Daesung (disambiguation) =

Daesung is a South Korean singer.

Daesung or Daeseong (Korean: 대성) may also refer to:

- Daesung Group, major South Korean industrial chaebol
- Daesong Bank, North Korean bank
- Dae-sung (name), Korean given name

== Geography ==
- Taesong-guyok (Daeseong-guyeok), district of Pyongyang, North Korea
- Daeseong-dong, village in Josan-ri, Gunnae-myeon, Paju, South Korea
- Daeseong-ri Station, train station in Cheongpyeong-myeon, Gapyeong-gun, Gyeonggi-do, South Korea
- Daeseongsan, several mountains of that name

== See also ==
- Daesong Market
