= Seongdong =

Seongdong or 성동 can refer to:

- Seong-dong, Korean-language given name
- Seongdong District, district of Seoul, South Korea
- Seongdong-dong, Gyeongju, former dong of Gyeongju, North Gyeongsang province, South Korea
- Seongdong Market, market in Gyeongju, North Gyeongsang province, South Korea
