= Taehwa Market =

Street market in Ulsan, South Korea

Coordinates: 35.551°N 129.294°E

- Hangul: 태화종합시장
- RR: Taehwa jonghap sijang
- MR: T'aehwa chonghap sijang

Taehwa Market (Korean: 태화종합시장; lit. 'Taehwa Comprehensive Market') is a traditional street market in Jung District, Ulsan, South Korea. The market includes shops that sell fruit, vegetables, meat, fish, breads, clothing, and Korean traditional medicinal items. The market also contains some small restaurants and street-food stalls. In recent years the city government launched an initiative to revive traditional markets, and so in 2011 the market underwent renovations, including the addition of new restroom facilities and parking spaces to provide a more modern feel while still retaining the atmosphere of a traditional market.

== See also ==
- List of markets in South Korea
- List of South Korean tourist attractions
