= Daeseongsan =

Daeseongsan may refer to:

- Daeseongsan (Gangwon) in the counties of Hwacheon and Cheorwon, Gangwon-do, South Korea. 1175 metres.
- Daeseongsan (North Chungcheong/South Chungcheong) in the county of Okcheon, Chungcheongbuk-do, and the county of Geumsan, Chungcheongnam-do. 705 metres.
- Daeseongsan (South Gyeongsang) in the county of Sancheong, Gyeongsangnam-do. 593 metres.
- Taesongsan in Taesong-guyok, Pyongyang, North Korea. 270 metres.
