= Ulsan Wholesale Agricultural and Fish Market =

Wholesale market in Ulsan, South Korea

Coordinates: 35.539°N 129.343°E

- Hangul: 울산 농수산물 도매시장
- RR: Ulsan nongsusanmul domaesijang
- MR: Ulsan nongsusanmul tomaesijang

Ulsan Wholesale Agricultural and Fish Market (Korean: 울산 농수산물 도매시장) is a wholesale market in Nam District, Ulsan, South Korea. The market comprises two structures, a covered area where agricultural products are sold, and a building that houses the fish market and several restaurants that prepare the fish after they are purchased. Prepared dishes include hoe, sannakji, and maeuntang. The market often sells whale meat and whales are sometimes butchered at the exterior of the fish market.

== See also ==
- List of South Korean tourist attractions
- List of markets in South Korea
