= Bangsan Market =

Traditional market in Seoul, South Korea

Coordinates: 37.5674°N 126.9996°E

- Hangul: 방산시장
- RR: Bangsan sijang
- MR: Pangsan sijang

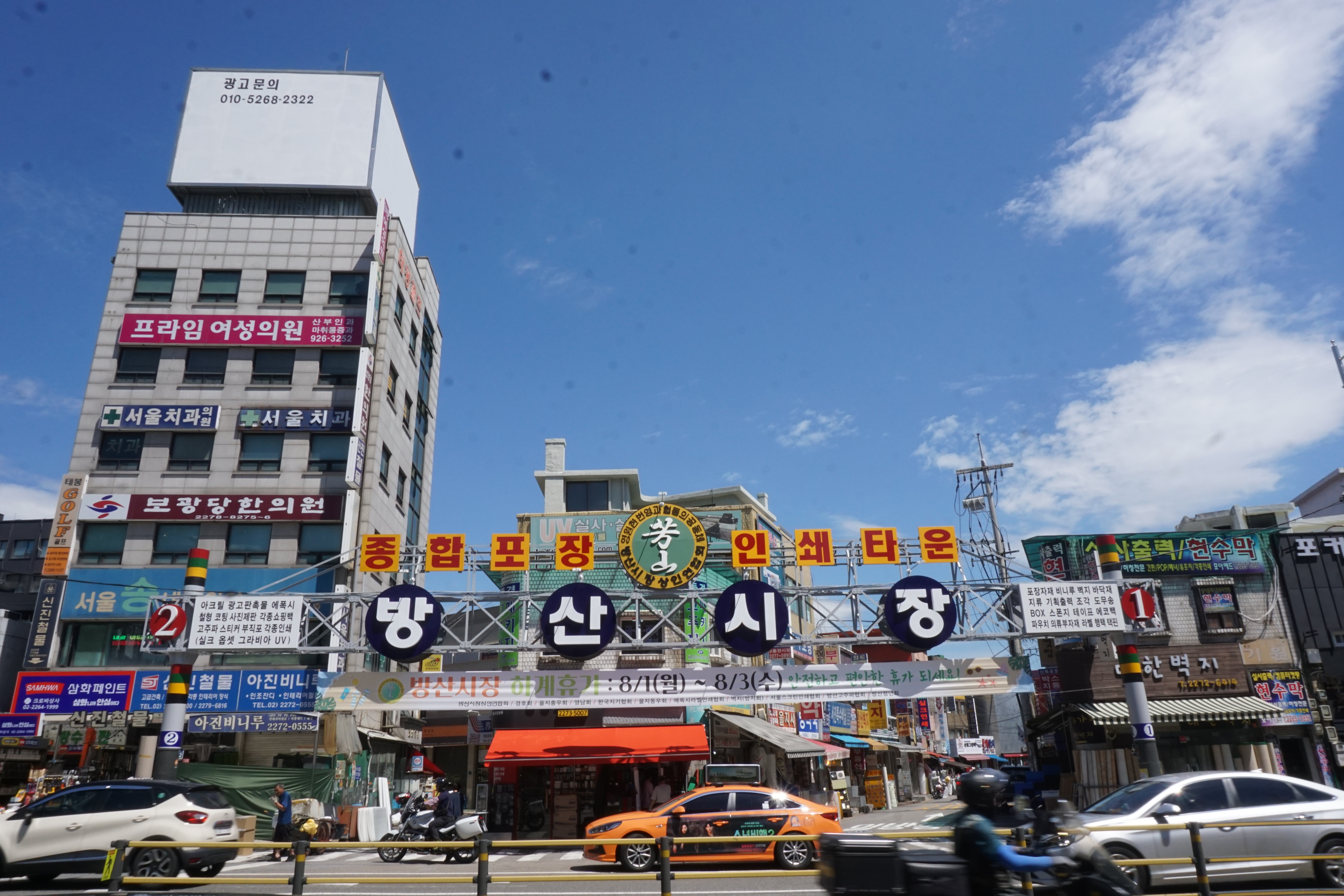
The market entrance

Bangsan Market (Korean: 방산시장) is a traditional market located in the Jugyo-dong neighborhood of Jung District, Seoul, South Korea. The market is famous for its pressed wrapping paper and includes more than 550 stores.

The name of the market comes from the location's former condition during the Joseon Dynasty. At that time the area was not well maintained, and therefore became infamous for its bad smell. People began calling this place Bangsan, bang being Korean for fragrant.

According to the Seoul Metropolitan Government, Bangsan Market has been designated a tourist destination since 2011. The government decided to keep the feel of a natural traditional market rather than modernize it.

== See also ==
- Shopping in Seoul
- List of markets in South Korea
- List of South Korean tourist attractions
