= Ulsan Central Market =

Street market in Ulsan, South Korea

Coordinates: 35.554°N 129.323°E

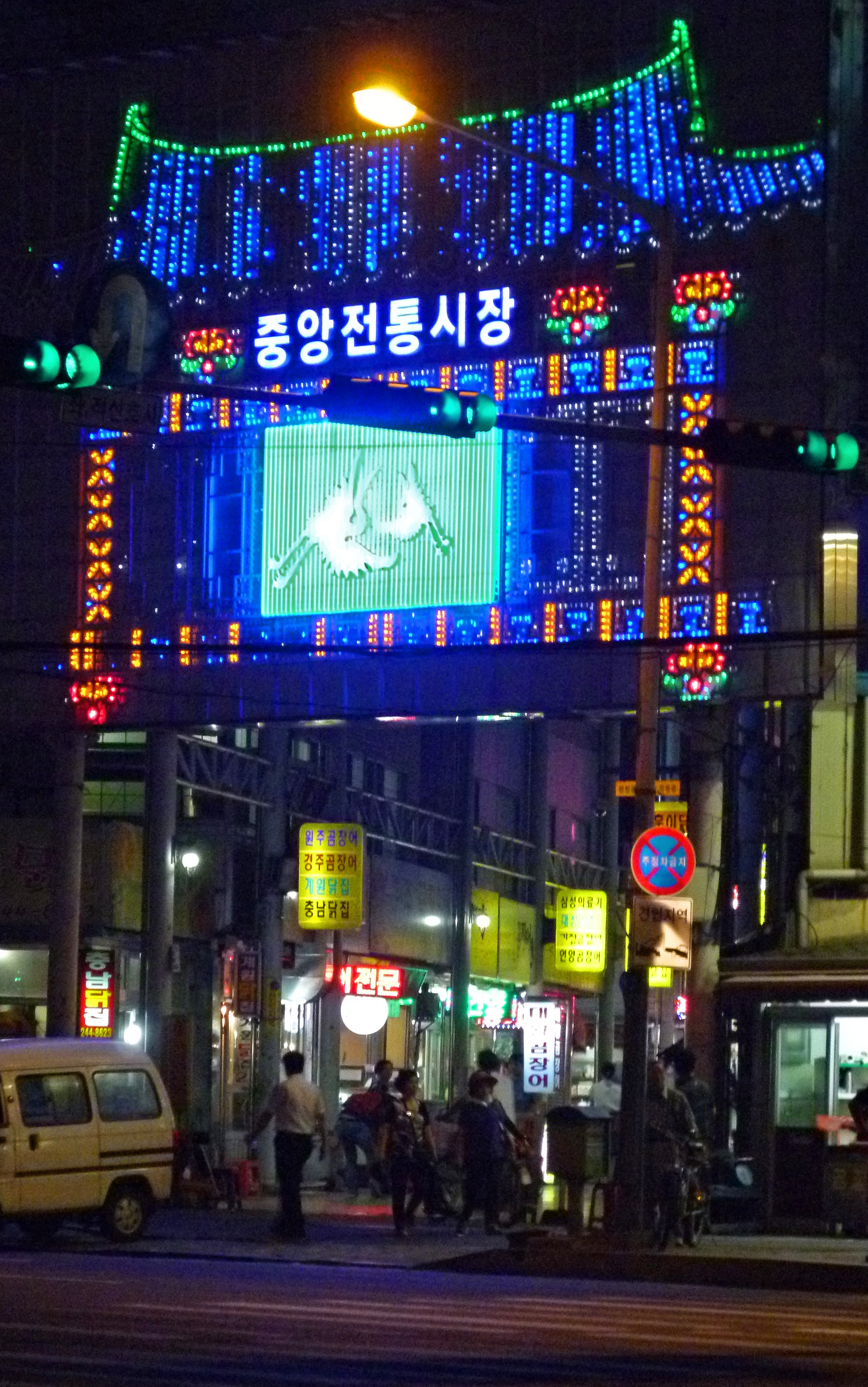
- A market entrance at night (2013)

Korean name
- Hangul: 울산중앙시장
- Hanja: 蔚山中央市場
- RR: Ulsan jungang sijang
- MR: Ulsan chungang sijang

Ulsan Jungang Market or Ulsan Central Market (Korean: 울산중앙시장) is a traditional street market in Jung District, Ulsan, South Korea. It is the largest traditional market in Ulsan. The market contains many shops that sell fruit, vegetables, meat, fish, breads, clothing, and Korean traditional medicinal items. The market also has many small restaurants and street-food stalls. The market is also home to Eel Alley (곰장어 골목; Gomjangeo golmok), which is a street famous for the many restaurants serving fresh barbequed pike eel that can be found there.

== See also ==
- List of markets in South Korea
- List of South Korean tourist attractions
