= Suam Market =

Street market in Ulsan, South Korea

Coordinates: 35.528°N 129.320°E

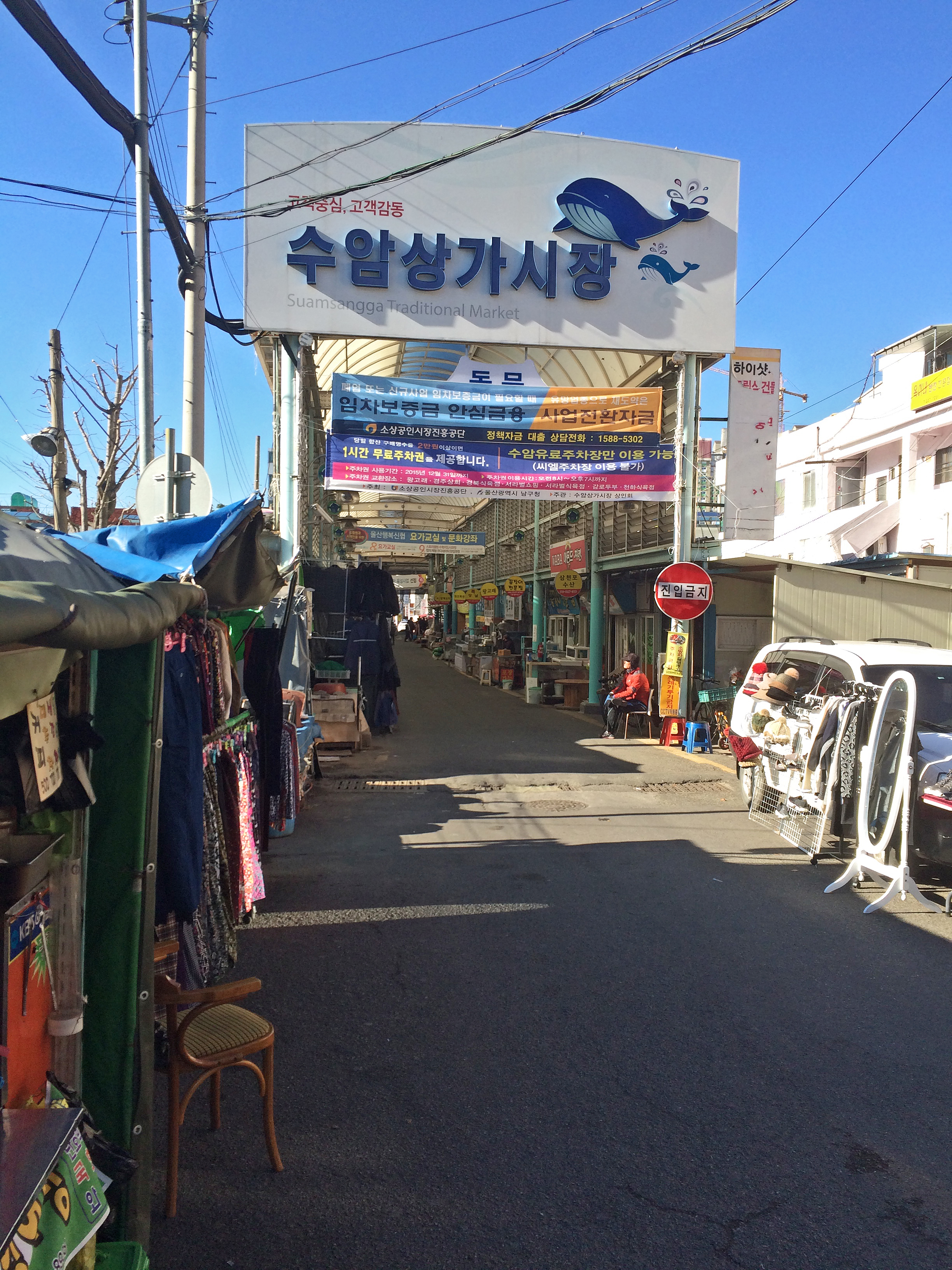
- Entrance to Suam Market

Korean name
- Hangul: 수암상가시장
- Hanja: 秀岩商街市場
- RR: Suam sangga sijang
- MR: Suam sangga sijang

Suam Market (Korean: 수암상가시장; lit. Suam Downtown Market) is a traditional street market in Nam District, Ulsan, South Korea. Established in the early 1970s, today the market has more than 120 shops that sell fruits, vegetables, meat, fish, breads, clothing, and Korean traditional medicinal items. The market is also home to many small restaurants and street food stalls. The market is only about 100 meters from a large Homeplus supermarket, and therefore the market's prices must be competitive in order to keep steady business.

== See also ==
- List of markets in South Korea
- List of South Korean tourist attractions
