= Wolbong Market =

Street market in Ulsan, South Korea

Coordinates: 35.495°N 129.425°E

- Hangul: 월봉시장
- RR: Wolbong sijang
- MR: Wŏlbong sijang

Wolbong Market (Korean: 월봉시장) is a traditional street market in Dong District, Ulsan, South Korea. The market contains many shops that sell fruit, vegetables, meat, fish, breads, clothing, and Korean traditional medicinal items. There are also many small restaurants and street-food stalls. The market is a popular shopping area for both locals and tourists.

== History ==
The market opened in 1980 with an area of 5,748 square metres (61,870 square feet) and 170 stores. Due to the emergence of large discount stores in the area, the city government began a market-revival initiative in the early 2000s to improve the infrastructure around Ulsan's traditional markets, while attempting to maintain their traditional atmosphere. The first set of Wolbong's renovations finished on May 3, 2003, and included the installation of a 140 m long, 4–8 m wide arcade to keep shoppers dry in rainy weather. Also included in the renovations were window-sill replacements, electrical improvements, toilet repair, roof waterproofing, construction reinforcements, the addition of fire-fighting facilities, and other remodeling jobs. The total cost of this renovation was KRW950,000,000 (US$760,000 in 2005). A second renovation was conducted in 2007 and included the installation of new sewer pipes and manhole covers.

== See also ==
- List of markets in South Korea
- List of South Korean tourist attractions
