= Yaeum Market =

Street market in Ulsan, South Korea

Coordinates: 35.524°N 129.332°E

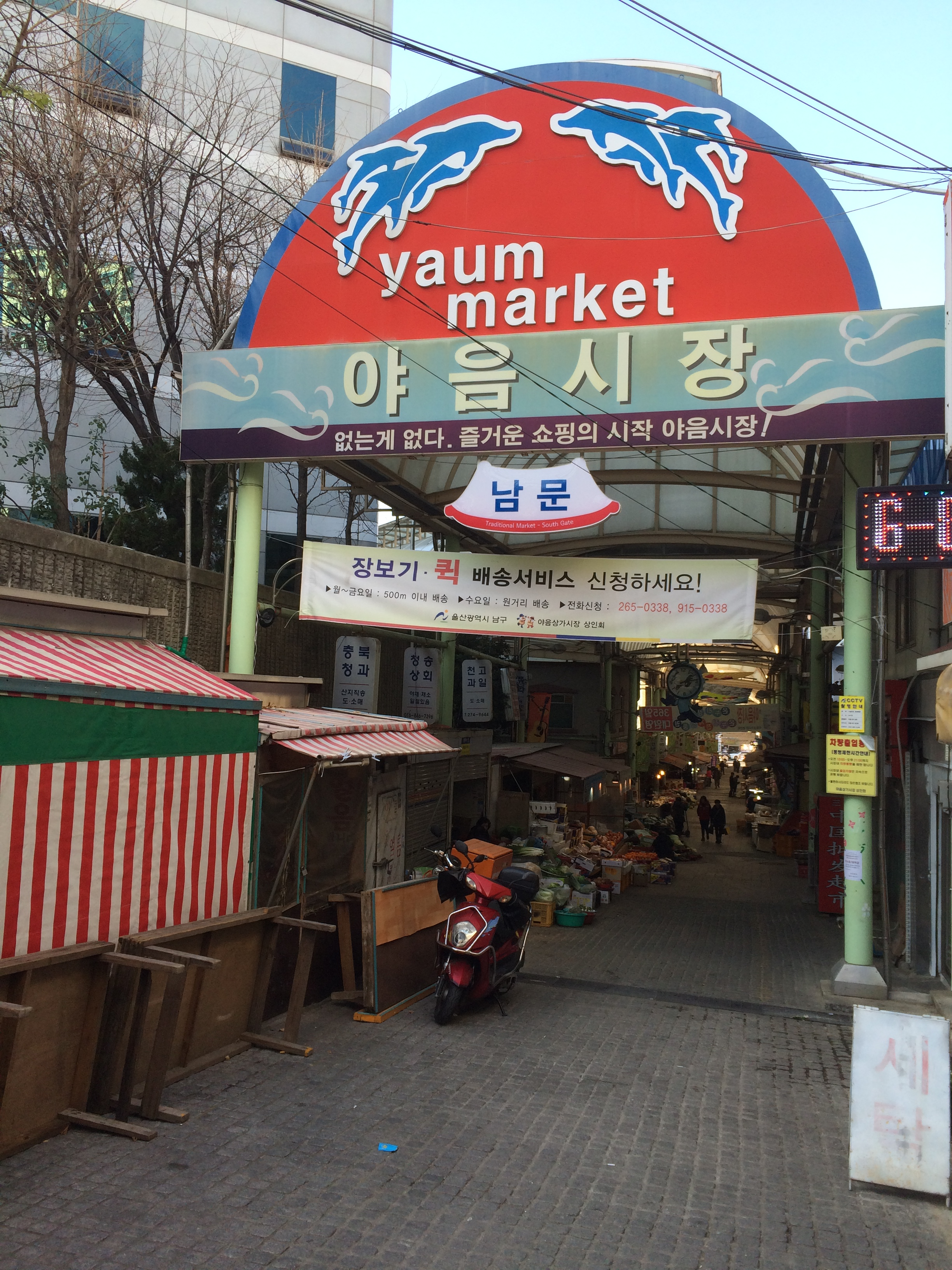
- Entrance to Yaeum Market

Korean name
- Hangul: 야음시장
- Hanja: 也音市場
- RR: Yaeum sijang
- MR: Yaŭm sijang

Yaeum Market (Korean: 야음시장) is a traditional street market in Nam District, Ulsan, South Korea. Established in 1976, today the market has more than 210 shops that sell fruits, vegetables, meat, fish, breads, clothing, and Korean traditional medicinal items. The market is also home to many small restaurants and street food stalls.

== Renovations ==
Due to the emergence of large discount stores in Ulsan, the city government began a market-revival initiative in the mid-2000s to improve the infrastructure around Ulsan's traditional markets, while attempting to maintain their traditional atmosphere. The renovations for Yaeum Market completed in October 2005 and included the installation of a 300-meter long, 8 m wide arcade to keep shoppers dry in rainy weather. The cost of the project was KRW317,000,000 (US$317,000 in 2005).

== See also ==
- List of markets in South Korea
- List of South Korean tourist attractions
