= Eonyang Market =

Street market in Ulsan, South Korea

Coordinates: 35.564°N 129.126°E

- Hangul: 언양시장
- RR: Eonyang sijang
- MR: Ŏnyang sijang

Eonyang Market (Korean: 언양시장) is a traditional street market about 2 km from Ulsan Station in Eonyang, Ulju County, Ulsan, South Korea. The market is spread out over 3386 m^{2} with more than 419 stores including many shops that sell fruit, vegetables, meat, fish, breads, clothing, and Korean traditional medicinal items. The market also has many small restaurants and street-food stalls.

== Renovations ==
Due to the emergence of large discount stores in Ulsan, the city government began a market-revival initiative in the mid-2000s to improve the infrastructure around Ulsan's traditional markets, while attempting to maintain their traditional atmosphere. The renovations for Eonyang Market finished in 2009 and included the installation of a 177-meter long arcade to keep shoppers dry in rainy weather.

== See also ==
- List of markets in South Korea
- List of South Korean tourist attractions
