= Ulsan Beongae Market =

Street market in Ulsan, South Korea

Coordinates: 35.521°N 129.336°E

- Hangul: 울산번개시장
- RR: Ulsan beongaesijang
- MR: Ulsan pŏn'gaesijang

Ulsan Beongae Market (Korean: 울산번개시장; lit. Ulsan Lightning Market) is a traditional street market in Nam District, Ulsan, South Korea. The market contains more than 150 shops that sell fruit, vegetables, meat, fish, breads, clothing, and Korean traditional medicinal items. The market is also home to many small restaurants and street food stalls.

== See also ==
- List of markets in South Korea
- List of South Korean tourist attractions
