= Sinjeong Market =

Street market in Ulsan, South Korea

Coordinates: 35.542°N 129.310°E

- Hangul: 신정시장
- RR: Sinjeong sijang
- MR: Sinjŏng sijang

Sinjeong Market (Korean: 신정시장) is a traditional street market in Nam District, Ulsan, South Korea. Established in 1970, today the market has more than 700 shops that sell fruits, vegetables, meat, fish, breads, clothing, and Korean traditional medicinal items. The market is also home to many small restaurants and street food stalls.

== Renovations ==
Due to the emergence of large discount stores in Ulsan, the city government began a Market-revival initiative in the mid-2000s to improve the infrastructure around Ulsan's traditional markets, while attempting to maintain their traditional atmosphere. The renovations for Sinjeong market completed in 2010 and included a new LED display, bathroom maintenance, installation of fire-fighting equipment and CCTV, and the installation of a 170-meter long arcade to keep shoppers dry in rainy weather.

== See also ==
- List of markets in South Korea
- List of South Korean tourist attractions
