= Daesong Market =

Street market in Ulsan, South Korea

Coordinates: 35.499°N 129.421°E

- Hangul: 대송농수산물시장
- RR: Daesong nongsusanmul sijang
- MR: Taesong nongsusanmul sijang

Daesong Market (Korean: 대송농수산물시장; lit. Daesong Agricultural Market) is a traditional street market in Dong District, Ulsan, South Korea. The market has many shops that sell fruits, vegetables, meat, fish, breads, clothing, and traditional Korean medicine. The market also contains many restaurants and street-food stalls.

== Renovations ==
Due to the emergence of large discount stores in Ulsan, the city government began a market-revival initiative in the mid-2000s to improve the infrastructure around Ulsan's traditional markets, while attempting to maintain their traditional atmosphere. The renovations for Daesong Agricultural Market started in September 2007 and included toilet maintenance, installation of fire-fighting equipment, and the installation of a 362-meter long, 8 m wide arcade to keep shoppers dry in rainy weather.

== See also ==
- List of markets in South Korea
- List of South Korean tourist attractions
