= Feskekôrka =

Building in Gothenburg, Sweden

Coordinates: 57°42′4″N 11°57′28″E

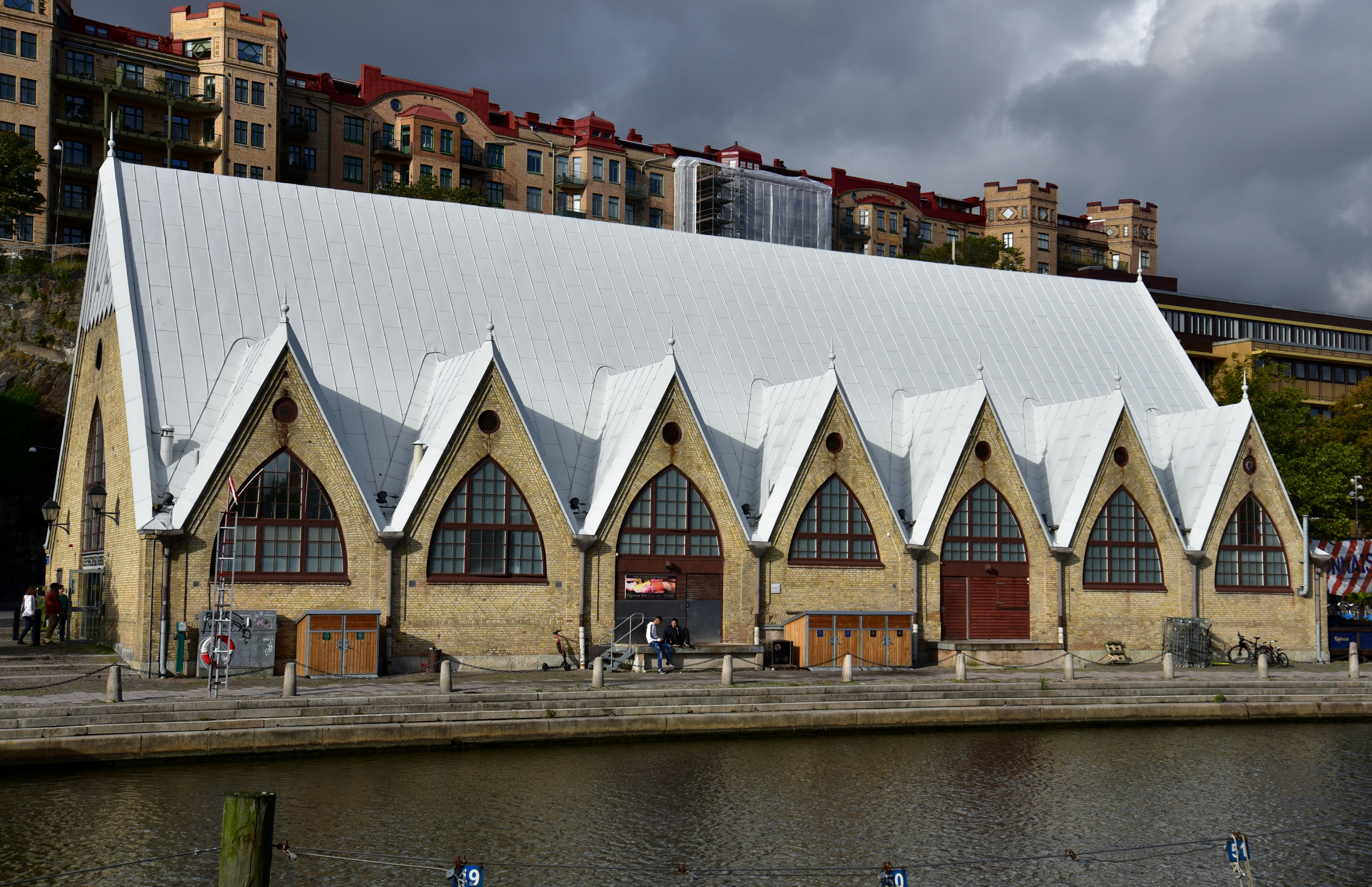
The Fish Church in Gothenburg

Feskekörka (Swedish: [ˈfɛ̂sːkɛˌɕœrːka]; standard: Fiskkyrkan, lit. 'fish church', also Feskekôrka) is a building in Gothenburg, Sweden, that formerly housed an indoor fish market. Its name is based on the building's resemblance to a neo-Gothic church. It opened on 1 November 1874, and was designed by the city architect Victor von Gegerfelt. Feskekörka is an institution in Gothenburg as well as a tourist magnet, housing one of the city's oldest trades, fishing.

Apart from a fish market, there was also a fish and seafood restaurant in the building. Feskekörka underwent a renovation for several years, beginning in 2021. There is now a single occupant of the building operating a restaurant business.

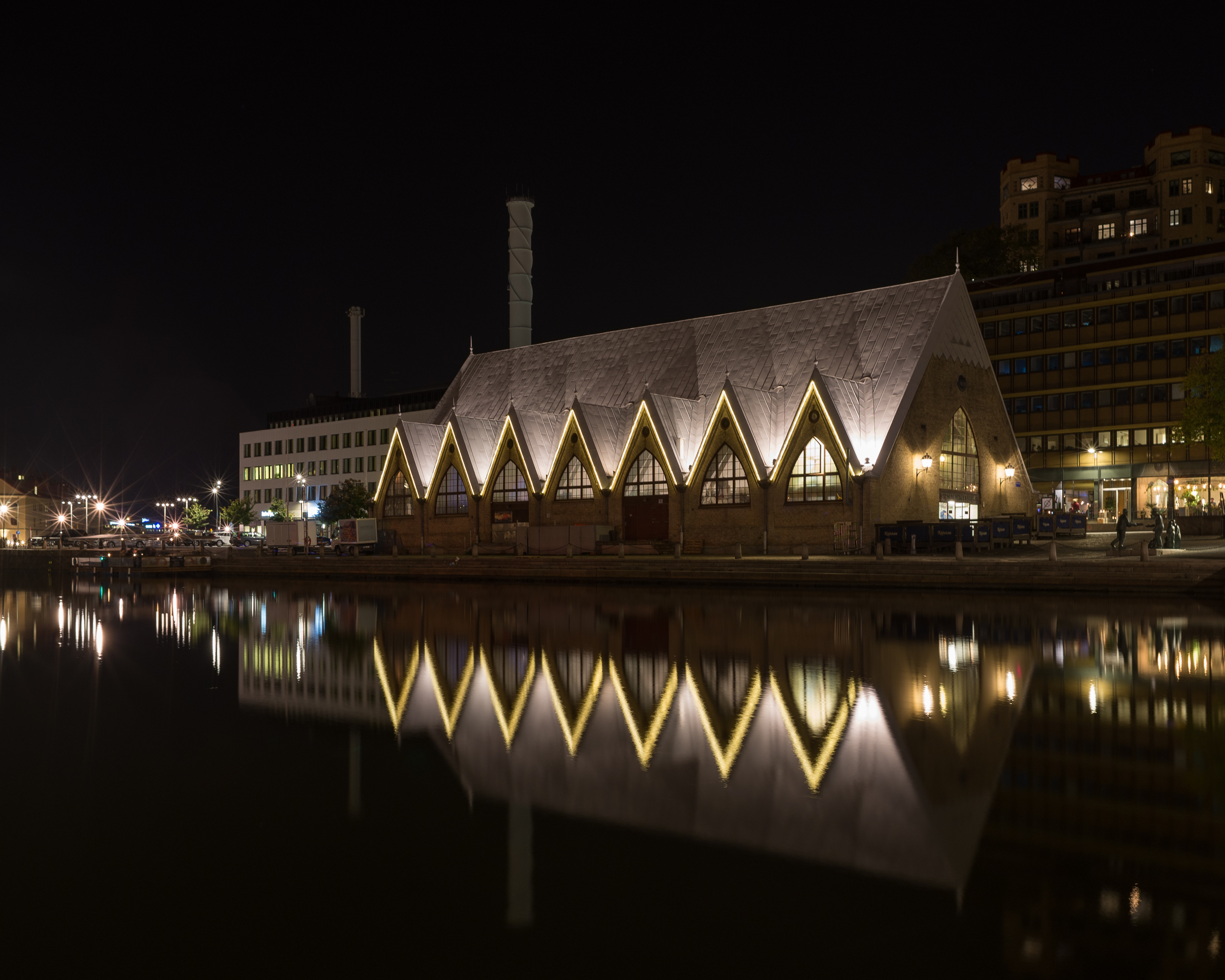
Feskekörka at night, 2016
