= Busan Cooperative Fish Market =

Fish market in Busan, South Korea

Coordinates: 35.0884°N 129.0252°E

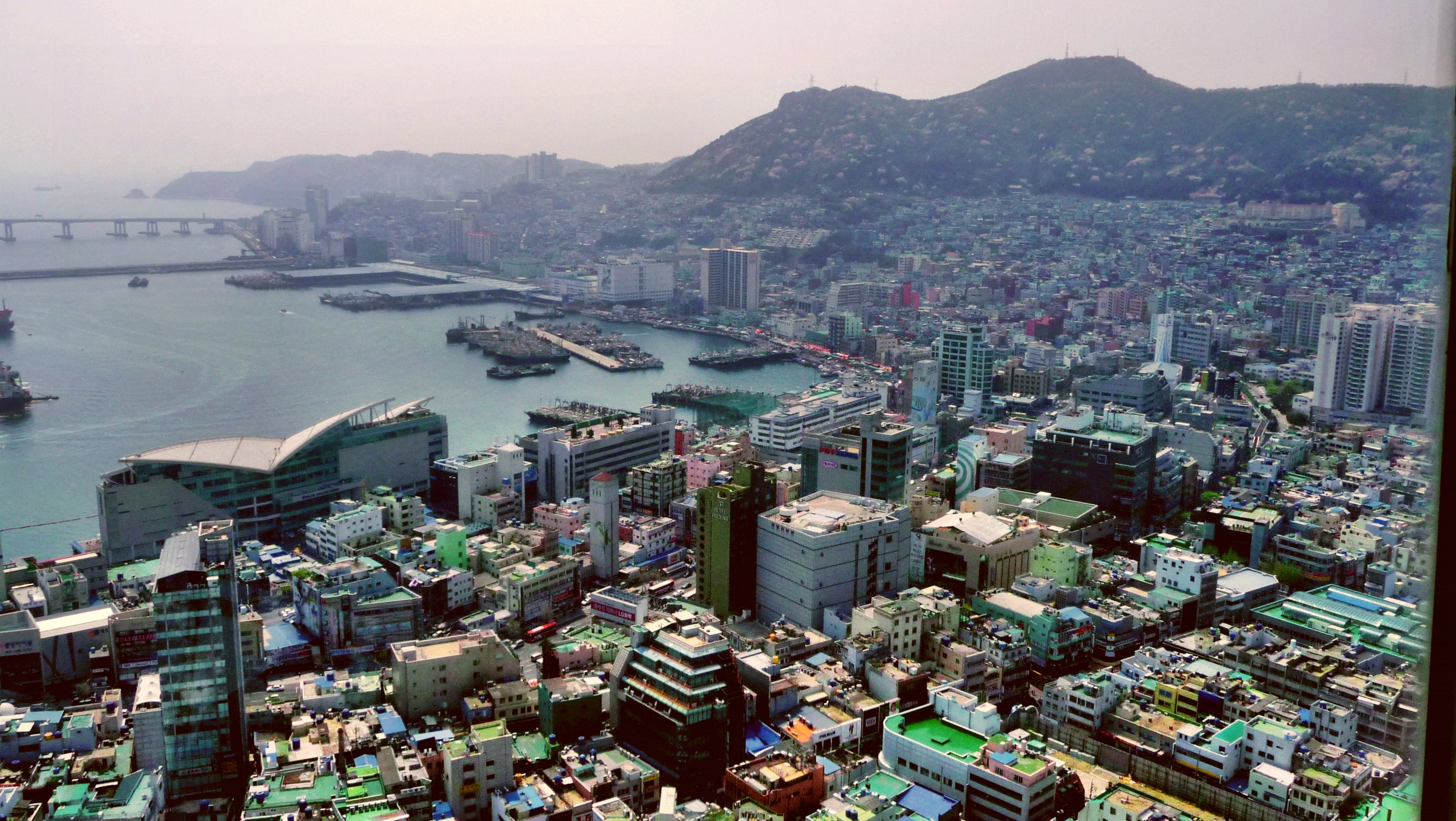
- Busan Cooperative Fish Market in Busan's South Harbor (Nam-hang)

Korean name
- Hangul: 부산공동어시장
- Hanja: 釜山共同魚市場
- RR: Busan gongdong eosijang
- MR: Pusan kongdong ŏsijang

The Busan Cooperative Fish Market (BCFM; Korean: 부산공동어시장) is the largest fish market in South Korea. It adjoins the South Harbor in the city of Busan, and more than 30% of the country's fish production passes through the market. In recent years, a large percentage of the catch has been made up of yellowtail, due to warming waters in the Sea of Japan. The market occupies an area of 166,420 m^{2}, of which about 10% is a refrigerated working area.

The market first opened in 1963 in pier 1 of the Port of Busan. It moved to its present location in January 1973.

== See also ==
- Economy of South Korea
- List of markets in South Korea
- Fishing industry
