= Daeseongsan (Gangwon) =

Mountain in South Korea

Daeseongsan (Gangwon-do)

Geography
- Location: South Korea

Daeseongsan (Korean: 대성산) is a mountain in South Korea. It has an altitude of 1,175 meters.

== See also ==
- List of mountains of Korea
