= Jeju Dongmun Traditional Market =

Traditional market in Jeju, South Korea

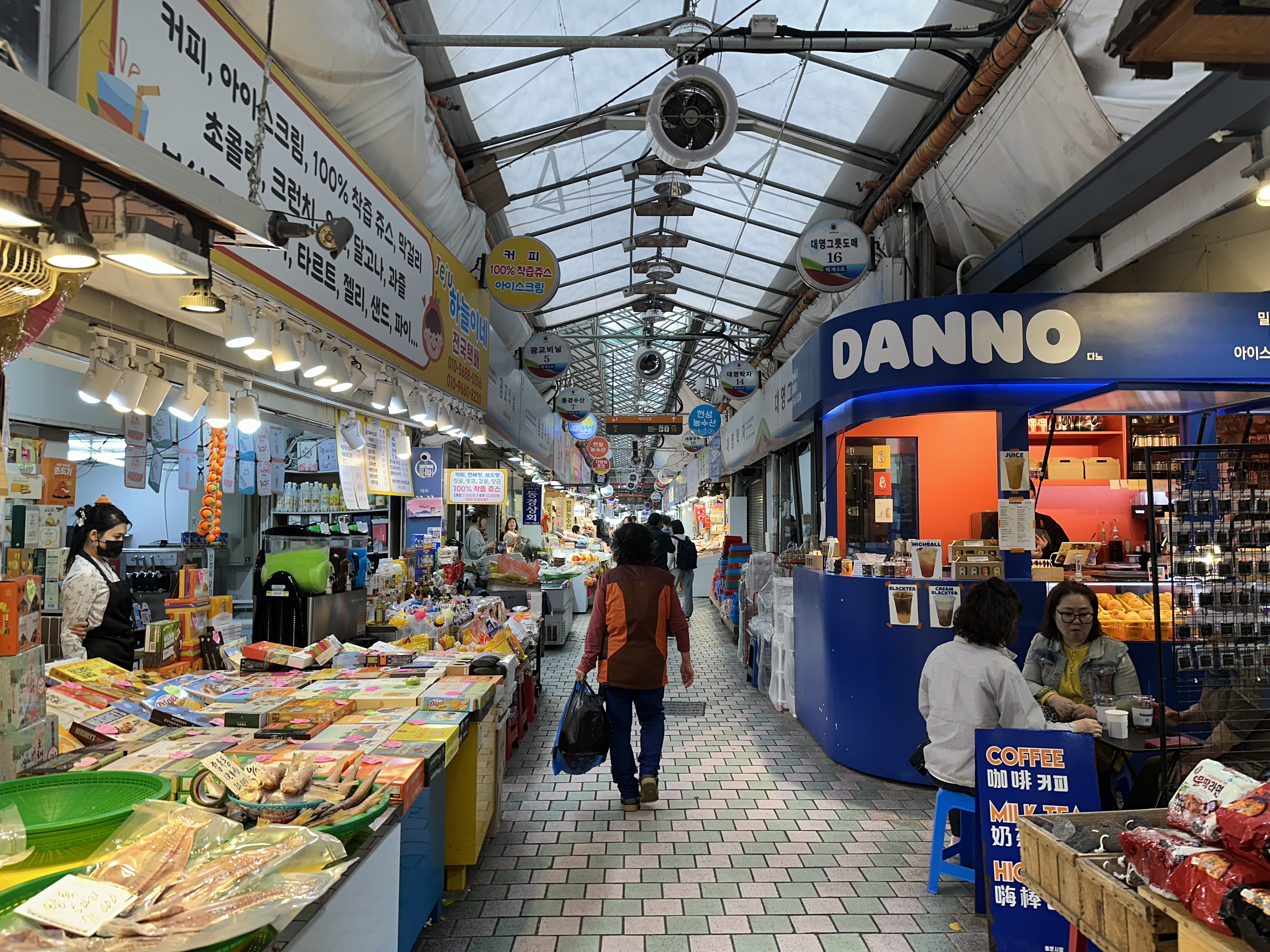
- Inside the market (2026)
- Coordinates: 33.5122°N 126.5267°E
- Address: 20 Gwandeok-ro 14-gil, Jeju City, Jeju Province, South Korea

Jeju Dongmun Traditional Market (Korean: 제주 동문재래시장) is a covered traditional market in Jeju City, Jeju Province, South Korea. It is the largest and oldest extant permanent traditional market in Jeju.

The market was established after the end of the Japanese colonial period. It was destroyed in a fire in March 1954, and rebuilt in its current location under the same name. It is one of the most popular traditional markets in Jeju, and is known for its fresh seafood.

It sells a variety of goods, including street food, souvenirs, hallabong mandarins, and seafood. There is a Dongmun Night Market in the back of the market that has food truck–style vendors.

== Gallery ==
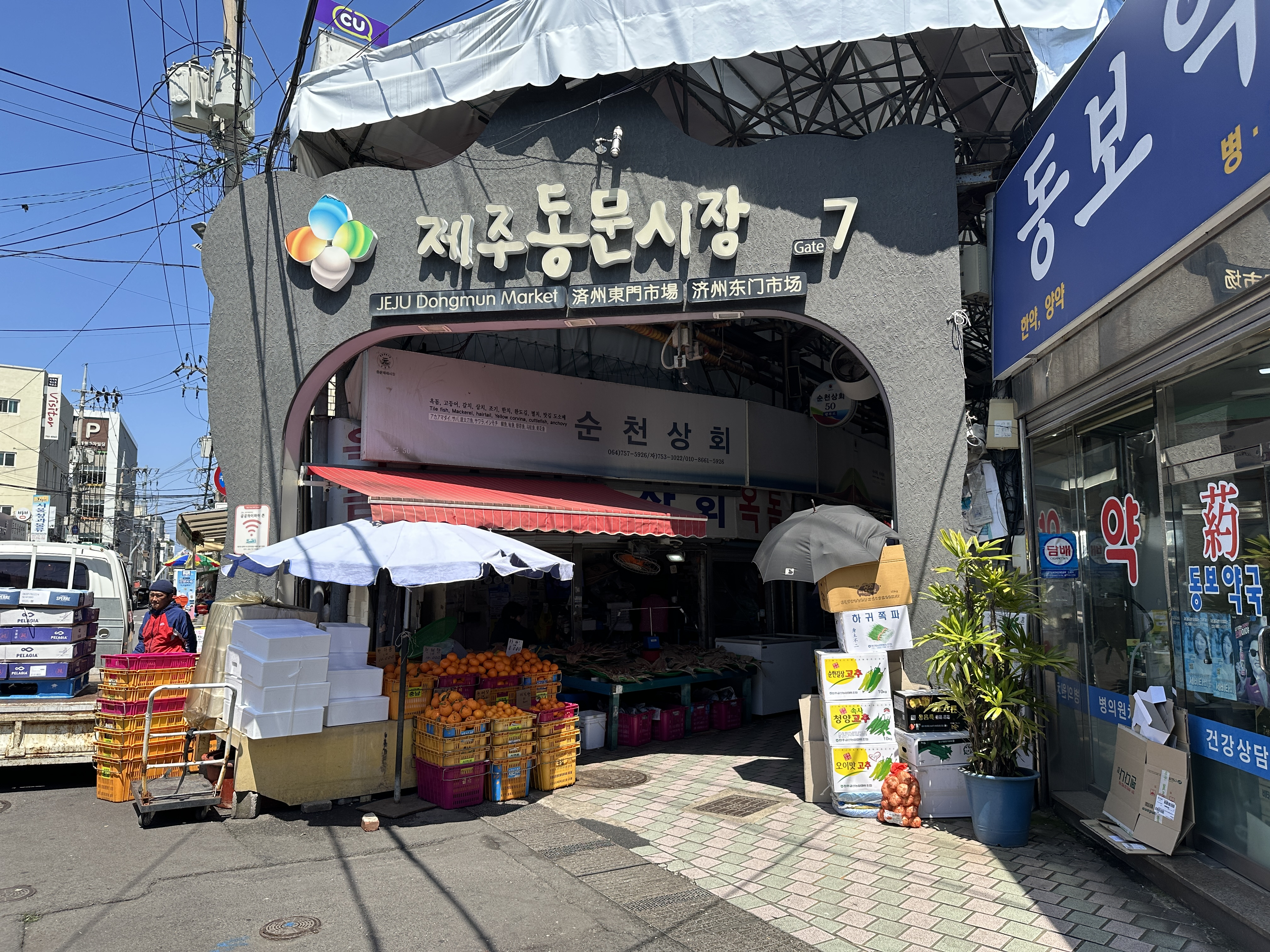
Gate no. 7 into the market (2026)

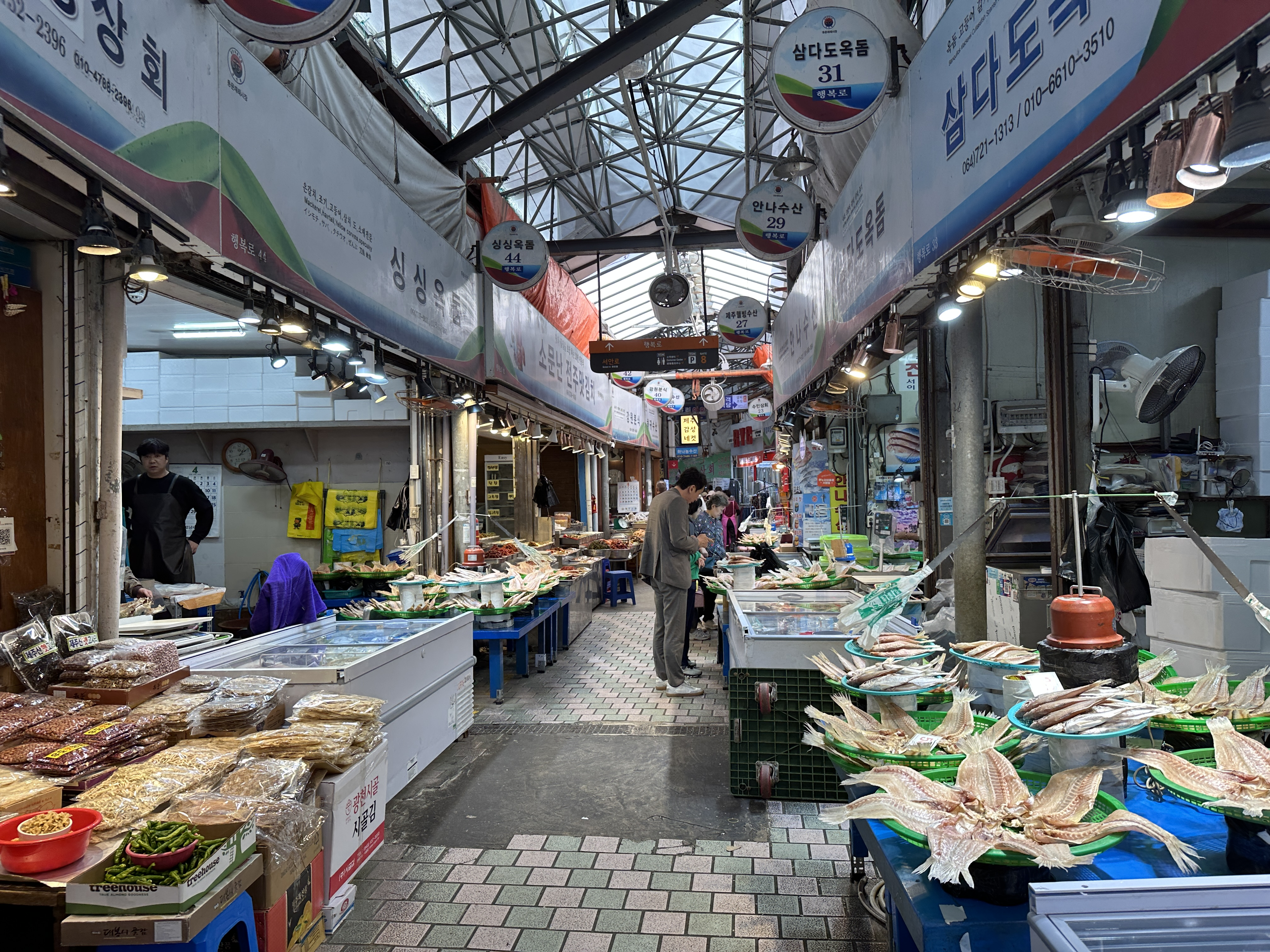
An alleyway in the market (2026)

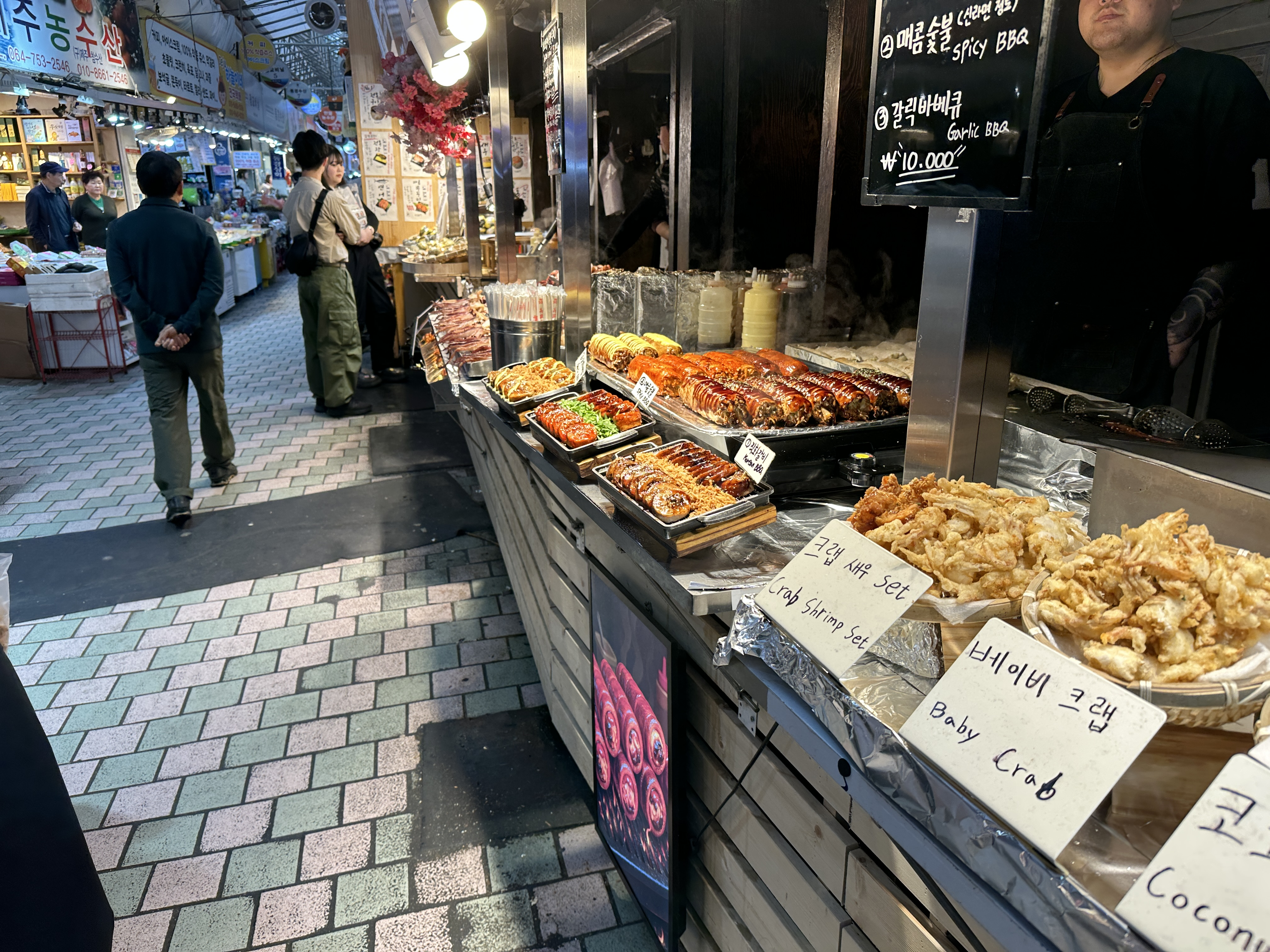
Food sold in the market (2026)

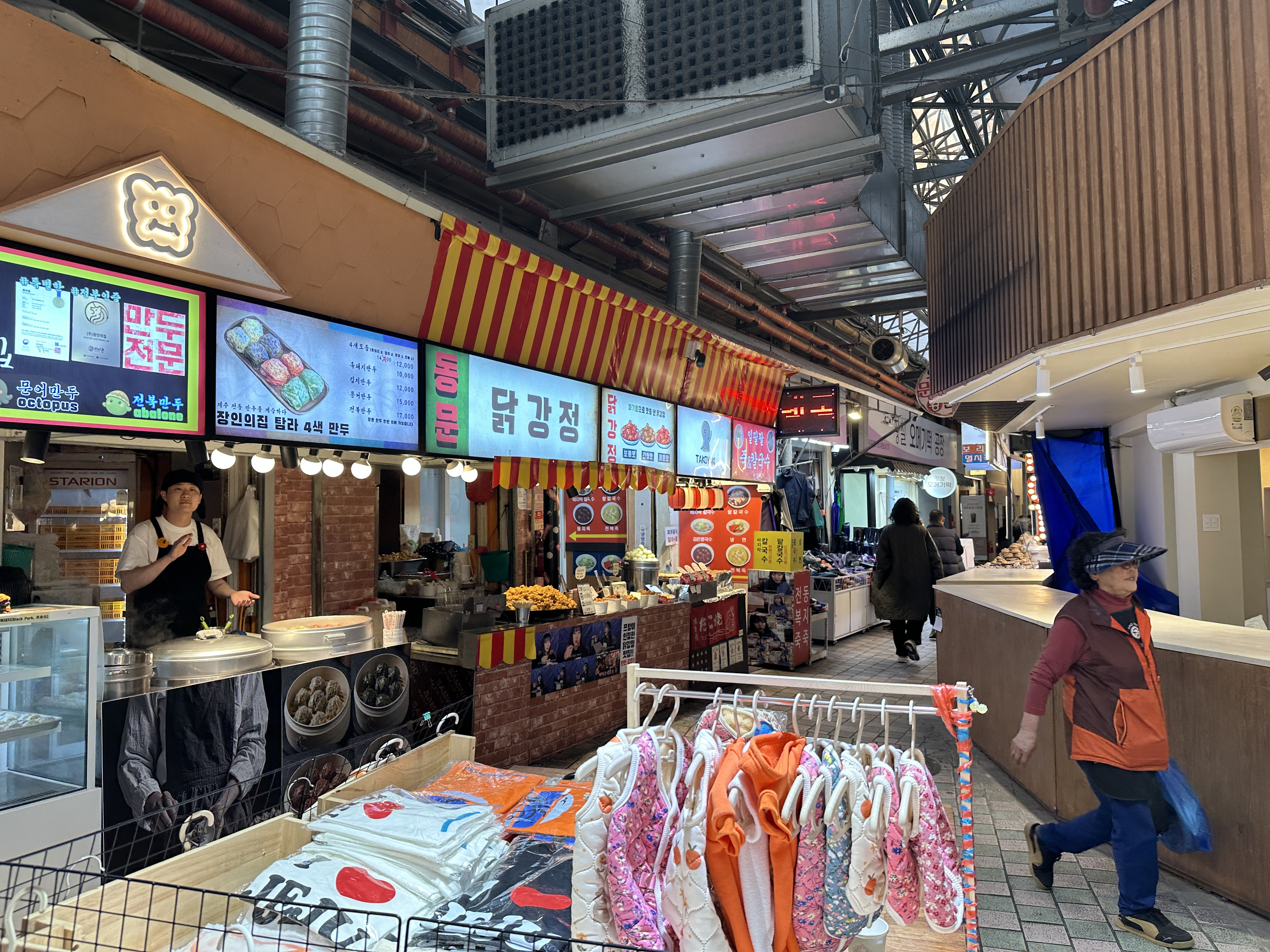
Various stores in the market (2026)

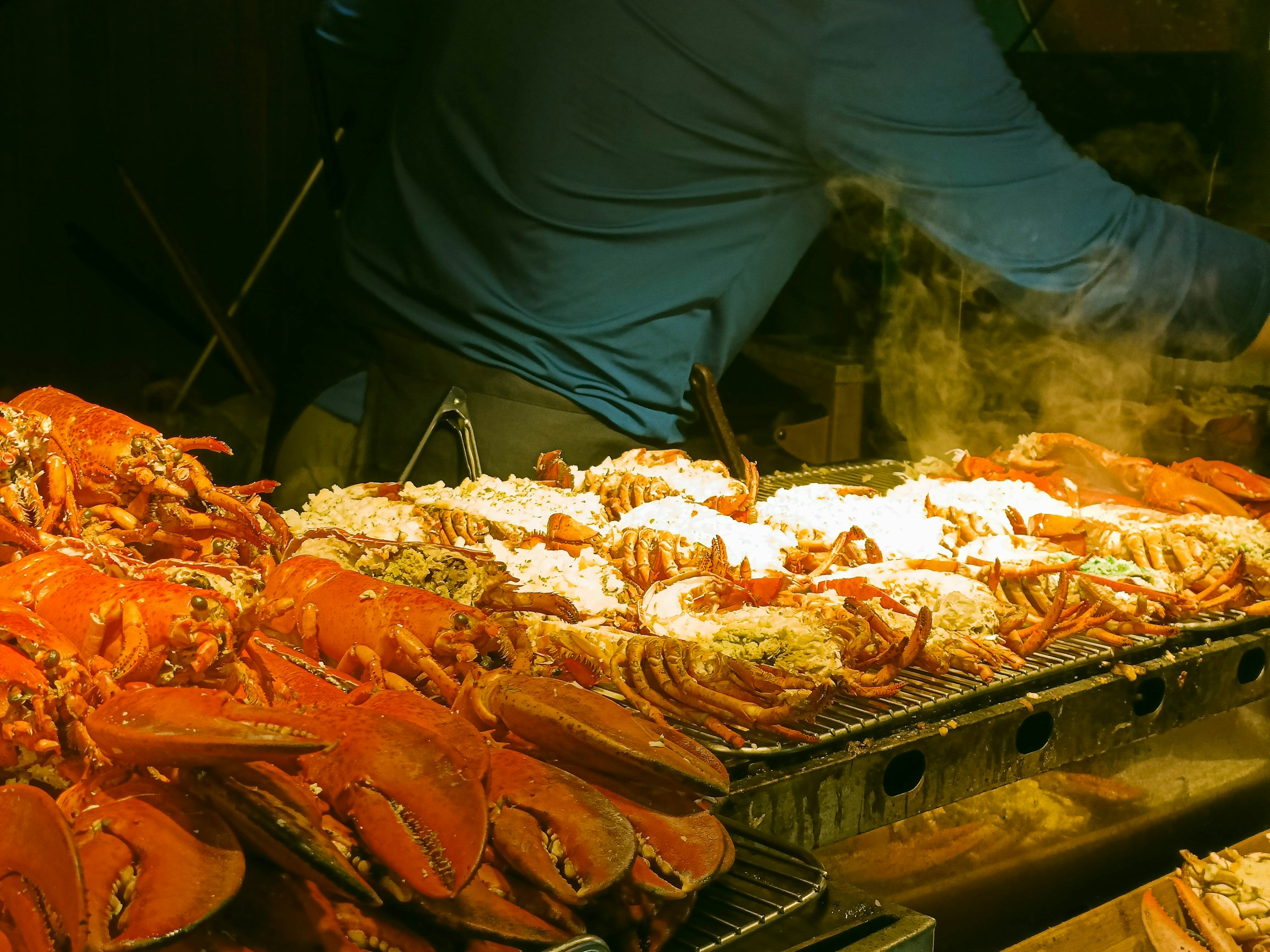
Vendor selling stuffed grilled lobster and crabs (2023)
