= Daeseongsan (South Gyeongsang) =

Mountain in South Korea

Highest point
- Elevation: 593 m (1,946 ft)

Geography
- Location: South Gyeongsang Province, South Korea

Korean name
- Hangul: 대성산
- Hanja: 大聖山
- RR: Daeseongsan
- MR: Taesŏngsan

Daeseongsan (Korean: 대성산) is a mountain of South Gyeongsang Province, southeastern South Korea. It has an elevation of 593 metres.

== See also ==
- List of mountains of Korea
