= Jung District, Ulsan =

Coordinates: 35°34′N 129°20′E

- Autonomous District
- Panoramic view of Jung District

- Flag

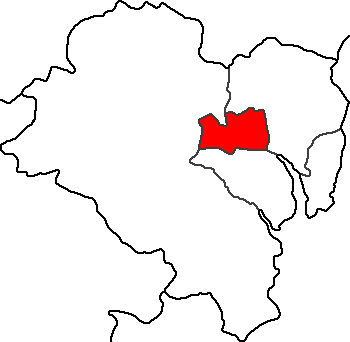
- Location of Jung District in Ulsan
- Country: South Korea
- Region: Yeongnam
- Provincial level: Ulsan
- Administrative divisions: 14 administrative dong

Area
  - Total: 37 km^{2} (14 sq mi)

Population (2025)
  - Total: 204,397
  - Density: 5,500/km^{2} (14,000/sq mi)
  - Dialect: Gyeongsang
- Website: Jung District Office

Korean name
- Hangul: 중구
- Hanja: 中區
- RR: Jung-gu
- MR: Chung-gu

Jung District (Korean: 중구; lit. 'Central District') is a gu (district) in south-central Ulsan, South Korea. Most of the population lives between the southern border of the Taehwa River and Ring Road. The current head of the district is Kim Young-gil.

== Demographics ==
As of July 1, 2024, Jung District had 94,357 households and a population of 208,568, with 105,484 males and 103,084 females.

== Administrative divisions ==
Jung District is organized into the following dong (neighborhoods):

- Bangu 1-dong (반구1동)
- Bangu 2-dong (반구2동)
- Boksan 1-dong (복산1동)
- Boksan 2-dong (복산2동)
- Bukjeong-dong (북정동)
- Byeongyeong 1-dong (병영1동)
- Byeongyeong 2-dong (병영2동)
- Daun-dong (다운동)
- Hakseong-dong (학성동)
- Okgyo-dong (옥교동)
- Seongnam-dong (성남동)
- Taehwa-dong (태화동)
- Ujeong-dong (우정동)
- Yaksa-dong (약사동)

== Local attractions ==
Seongnam-dong in central Jung District is generally regarded as the center of Ulsan. Other local attractions include Dongheon (동헌), an old complex used by the Japanese as a base of government during the occupation of Korea; Hyanggyo (향교), an old Confucian academy; Byeongyeongseong (병영성), remnants of an old hill fortress; Hakseong Park (학성공원), an ancient hilltop stupa that is the only one in South Korea to have the oriental zodiac figures carved around its base; and Ulsan Central Market, the largest traditional market in Ulsan.

== See also ==
- List of districts in South Korea
