= Busanjin Market =

Traditional market in Busan, South Korea

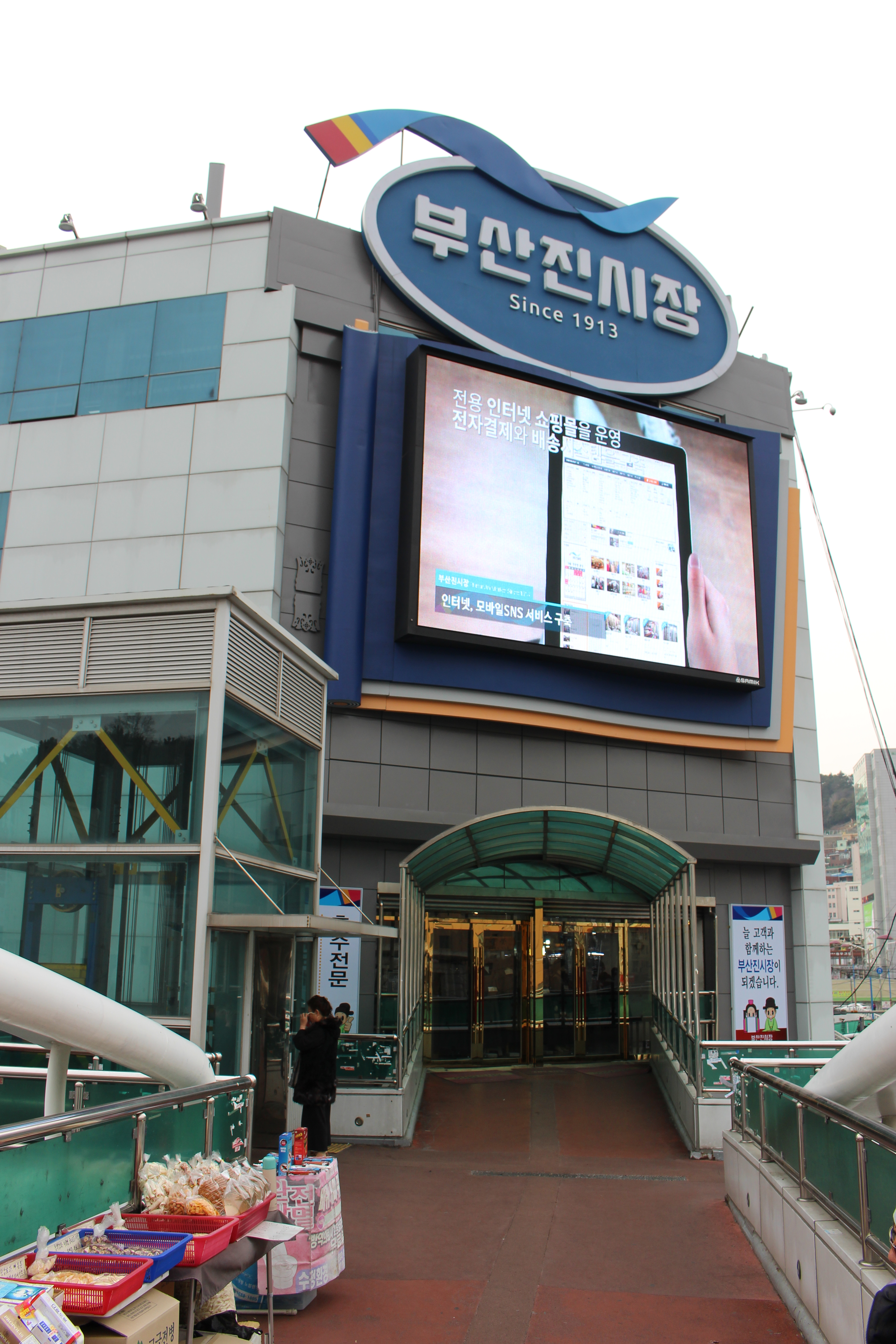
- Market entrance (2018)
- Coordinates: 35.1364°N 129.0587°E
- Address: 24 Jinsijang-ro, Dong District, Busan, South Korea
- No. of floors: 6 (4 above and 2 underground)
- Website: busanjinmart.co.kr (available in English)

Busanjin Market (Korean: 부산진시장; Hanja: 釜山鎭市場) is a traditional market in Beomil-dong, Dong District, Busan, South Korea.

== Description ==
The market currently has two underground and four above-ground floors. In 2012, it had around 1,500 businesses and 2,000 workers. Many stores specialize in clothing and textiles.

== History ==
The market has its origins in an infrequent Joseon-era market that has been attested to in a text from 1770. It was a fish market located outside the west gate of the fortress Busanjinseong.

In September 1913, two tin-roof structures were constructed on this spot, which formalized the location. The market was expanded and renovated several times over the following decades, and eventually became a wooden structure in February 1958.

The market was temporarily relocated elsewhere in the late 1960s, while a more permanent structure was built on the original spot. Construction on the new building began on March 29, 1968, and completed on August 28, 1970. The new building had four above-ground floors and two underground floors, with a floor area of around 29,090 square meters (313,100 sq ft). Shops moved in and began operating by October 8, 1970.

A rooftop parking lot and elevator was constructed in March 1978. An additional elevator was installed in May 1988. In April 1993, a separate building for parking was established, with 700 spaces. The interior was remodeled between 2002 and 2005.

== Gallery ==
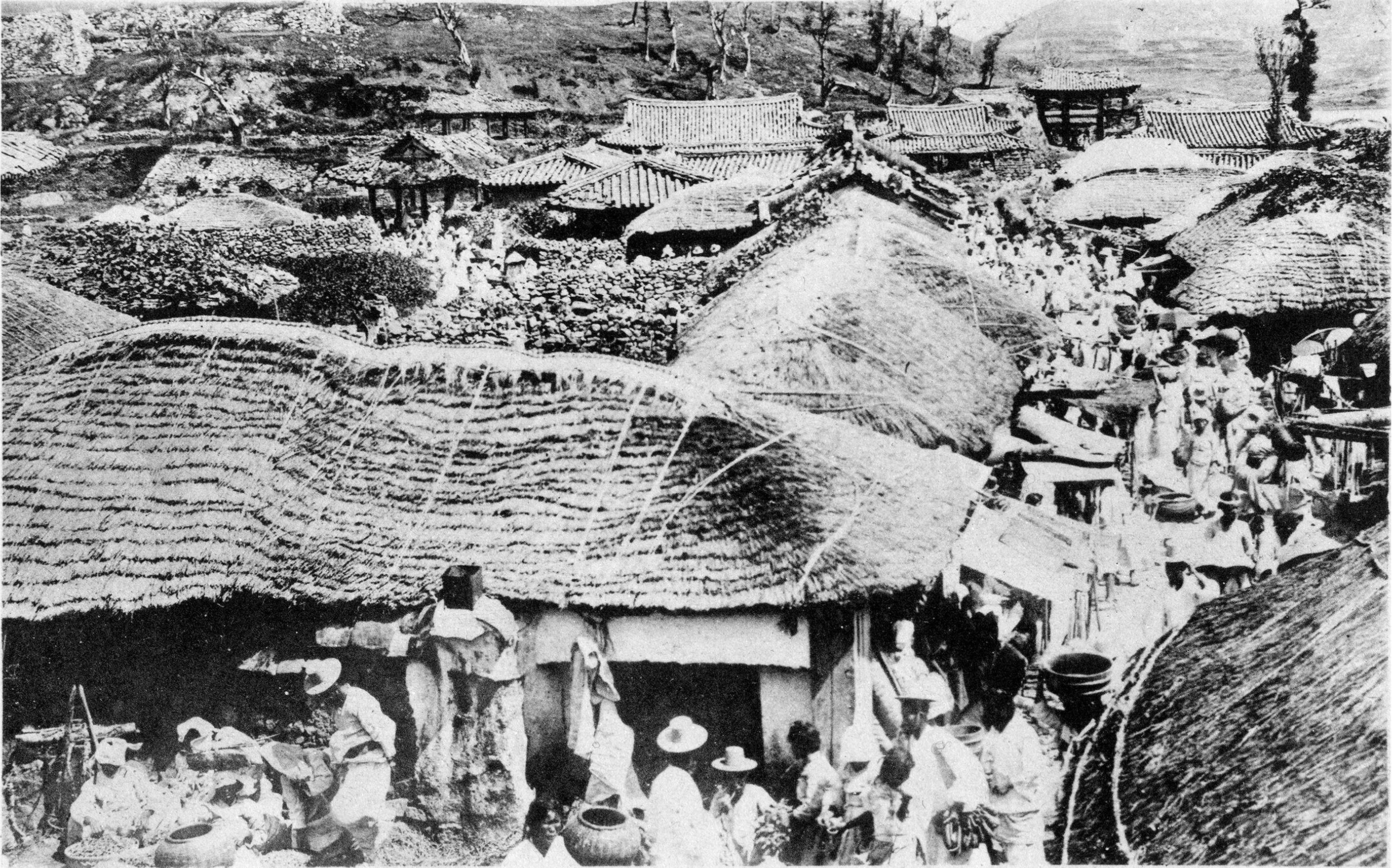
A market roughly in the area of the modern market (1910)

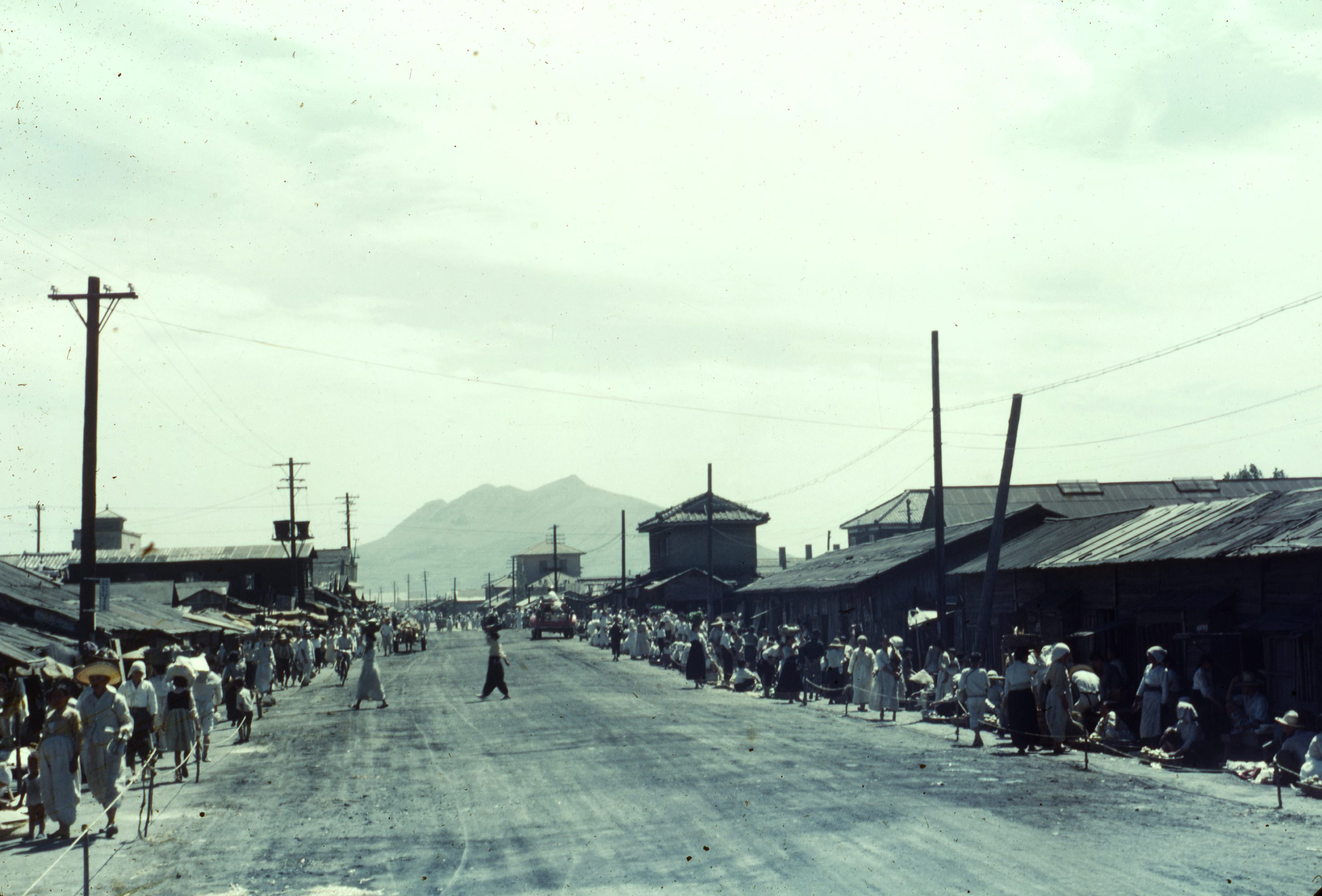
Road next to the market (1950)
