= Seongdong Market =

Market in Gyeongju, South Korea

Coordinates: 35.84549°N 129.21630°E

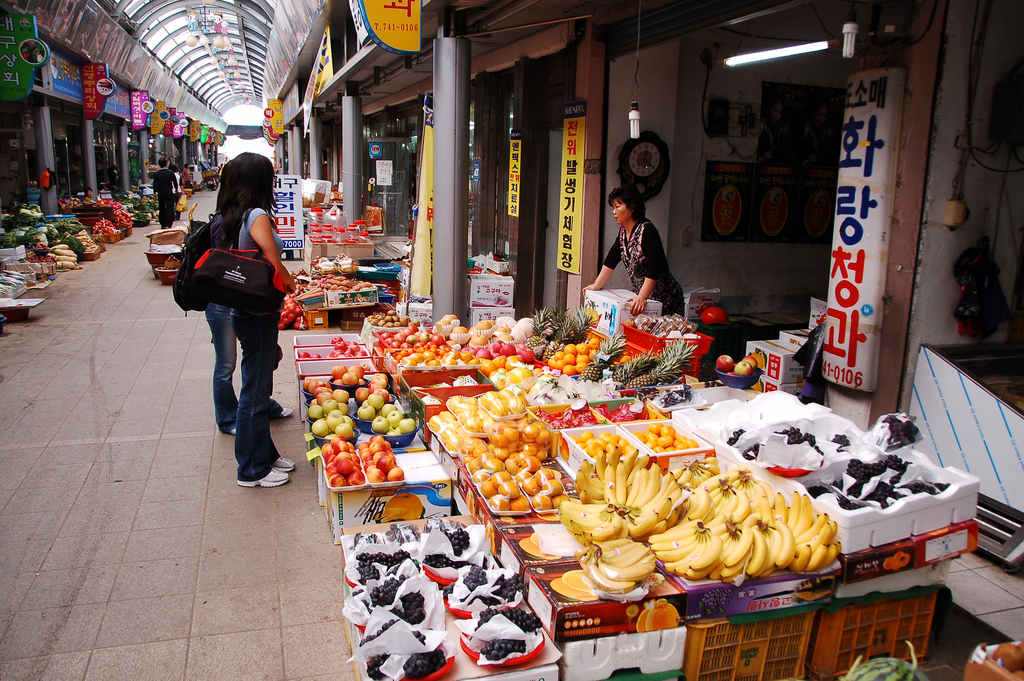

Korean name
- Hangul: 성동시장
- Hanja: 城東市場
- RR: Seongdong sijang
- MR: Sŏngdong sijang

Seongdong market (Korean: 성동시장) is the largest traditional market in Gyeongju, North Gyeongsang province, South Korea. Located on the opposite side of Gyeongju station with an entrance on Wonhwa-ro (street), it provides crops, vegetables, fruits, and seafood produced in Gyeongju and nearby areas. There are also vendors that sell street food such as kimbap, sundae, and tteokbokki. An indoor area composed of ten or so restaurants offer fresh banchan as a buffet-style meal or à la carte. Seongdong Market was established in 1971. The market opens in the early morning.

== See also ==
- List of markets in South Korea
- List of South Korean tourist attractions
