= Dae-sung (name) =

- Hangul: 대성
- RR: Daeseong
- MR: Taesŏng

Dae-sung, also spelled Dae-seong, is a Korean given name.

== People ==
People with this name include:

=== Sportspeople ===
- Lee Dae-Sung (born 1958), Korean-American taekwondo practitioner
- Koo Dae-sung (born 1969), South Korean baseball player
- Kim Dae-sung (footballer) (born 1972), South Korean football player
- Kwak Dae-sung (born 1973), South Korean judoka
- Moon Dae-sung (born 1976), South Korean taekwondo practitioner
- Kim Dae-sung (badminton) (born 1984), South Korean badminton player
- Ha Dae-sung (born 1985), South Korean football player
- Moon Dae-seong (born 1986), South Korean football player
- Hwang Te-song (born 1989), South Korean football player
- Jin Dae-sung (born 1989), South Korean football player

=== Other ===
- Kim Daeseong (700–774), Silla minister
- Kang Daesung (born 1989), South Korean singer, member of boy band Big Bang

== See also ==
- List of Korean given names
