= Seong-dong =

- Hangul: 성동
- RR: Seongdong
- MR: Sŏngdong

Seong-dong or Sung-dong (Korean: 성동) is a Korean given name. Notable people with the name include:

- Baek Sung-dong (born 1991), South Korean football midfielder
- Kim Seong-dong (1947–2022), South Korean author
- Kweon Seong-dong, South Korean lawyer and politician
