= Jugyo-dong =

Neighbourhood in Seoul, South Korea

- Interactive map of Jugyo-dong
- Coordinates: 37°34′5.16″N 126°59′56.4″E
- Country: South Korea

Area
  - Total: 0.07 km^{2} (0.027 sq mi)

Korean name
- Hangul: 주교동
- Hanja: 舟橋洞
- RR: Jugyo-dong
- MR: Chugyo-dong

Jugyo-dong (Korean: 주교동) is a legal dong (neighbourhood) of Jung District, Seoul, South Korea. It is governed by its administrative dong, Euljiro 3, 4, 5ga-dong.

== Geography ==
Most of the area is hilly with a gentle slope. It has been designated as a development restricted area.

The administrative and legal names are the same. Villages include Masanggol, Park Jaegung, Witbaedari, Utmal, and Ijakgol. It is an administrative dong in the northwest of Deogyang District, Goyang, Gyeonggi Province, South Korea.

== History ==
The name jugyo-ri (舟橋) appears for the first time in Goyang Gunji, published during the Joseon Dynasty. It is said that Parkjaegungchon, Lee Inggok, Sageunjeol, and Seongrashinchon lived in the bishop's village, along with the record 'jugyo-ri' village in Wondang-myeon (元堂面) Lee Pa-ri'. In the Local Map of 1872, it is marked as Jugyo-ri in the central part of Goyang-gun. Lee Par-ri was changed to Park Jae-gung, Bishop Sang-ri, Bishop Hari, Sageun-sari, and Sampa-ri due to the reorganization of administrative districts in 1906. In 1914 it was Jugyo-ri, Wondang-myeon, Goyang-gun.

Due to the great flood in 1925, a boat was washed down to this village. Another theory is that this is because the topography of the village is shaped like a ship. Therefore, the name of jugyo-dong can be considered as the Chinese character of Baedari. Currently, there is a natural village called Witbaedari, the bishop's Hangeul place name.

In 1979, it became Jugyo-ri, Wondang-eup, and with the promotion to Goyang-si in 1992, it became an administrative dong that had jurisdiction over Jugyo-dong and Seongsa-dong. The name Jugyo-Dong. Before the construction of the Han River embankment in the early 1930s, a river led to the Han River in front of the village.

In 1996, when relief was implemented, it became the jurisdiction of Deokyang-gu. Since 1914, Wondang-myeon, Wondang-eup, and Wondang-gun have been the center of local administration, and even today, it occupies an important role as the administrative seat of Goyang City.

There are Wonneung Station, Goyang City Hall, and public health center, and transportation is convenient as the Seoul Suburban Railway, National Road 39, Local Road 310, and the Seoul Outer Ring Expressway intersect.

== Statistic ==
- Area 5.62 km^{2}
- Population 2,791 people as of 2009

== See also ==
- Administrative divisions of South Korea
- Jugyo-dong
