= Daeseongsan (North Chungcheong and South Chungcheong) =

Mountain in Okcheon, South Korea

Highest point
- Elevation: 705 m (2,313 ft)

Geography
- Location: South Korea

Korean name
- Hangul: 대성산
- Hanja: 大聖山
- RR: Daeseongsan
- MR: Taesŏngsan

Daeseongsan (Korean: 대성산) is a South Korean mountain in Okcheon County, North Chungcheong Province. It has an elevation of 705 m (2,313 ft).

== See also ==
- List of mountains in Korea
