= Fish market =

Marketplace for fish and fish products

A fish market is a marketplace for selling fish and fish products. It can be dedicated to wholesale trade between fishermen and fish merchants, or to the sale of seafood to individual consumers, or to both. Retail fish markets, a type of wet market, often sell street food as well.

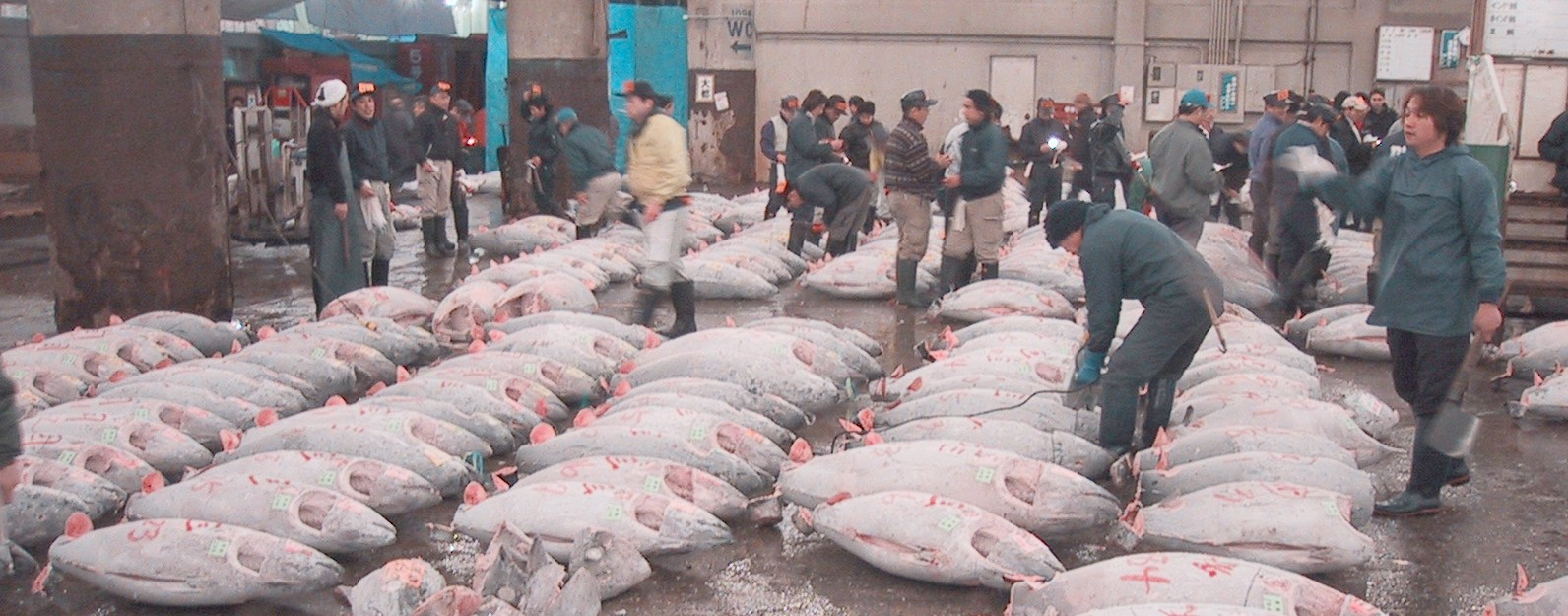
Frozen tuna in the Tsukiji fish market, Tokyo

Fish markets range in size from small fish stalls to large ones such as the great Tsukiji fish market in Tokyo, which turns over about 660,000 tonnes a year. The term fish market can also refer to the process of fish marketing in general, but this article is concerned with physical marketplaces.

== History and development ==
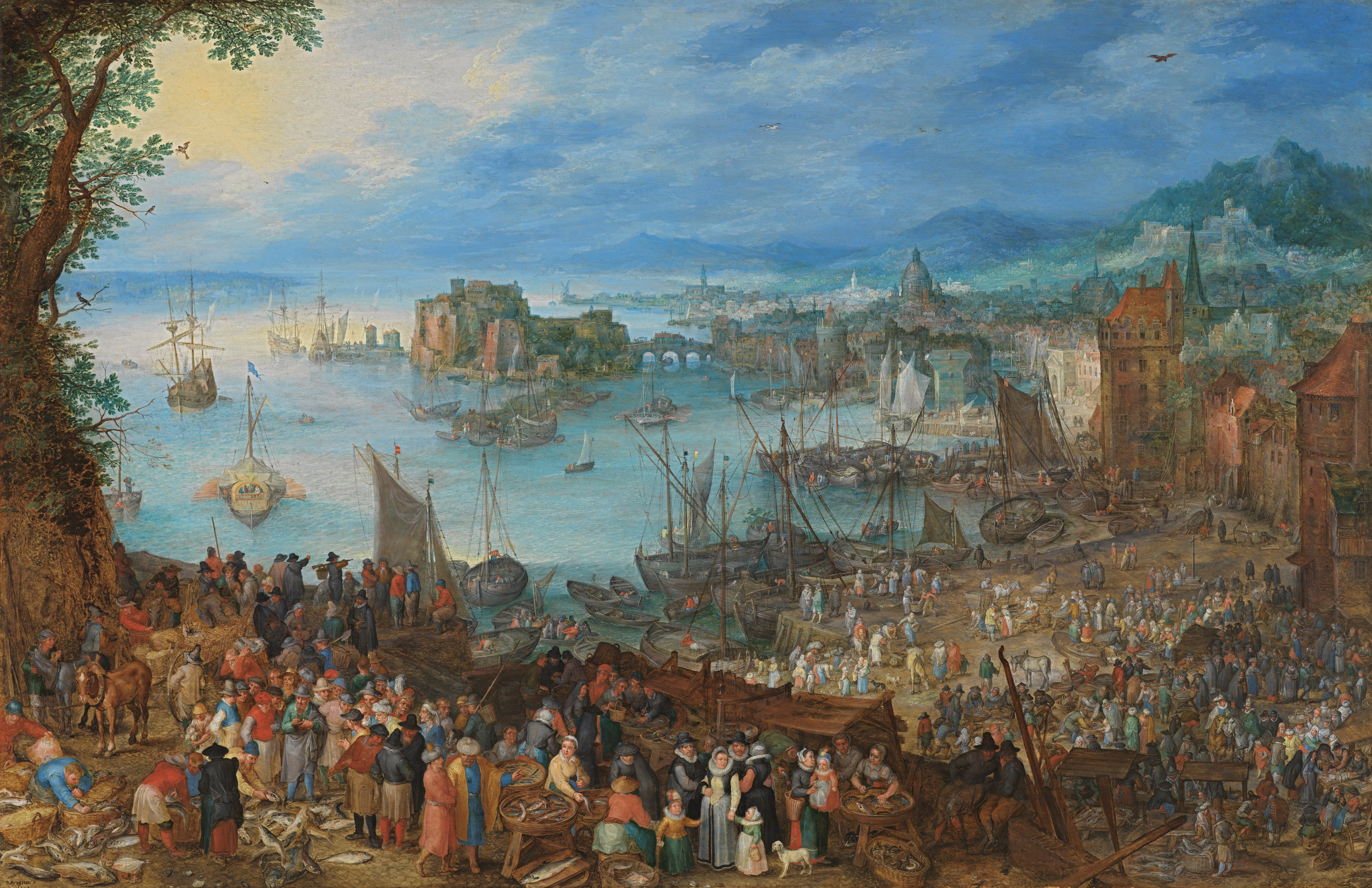
The Great Fish Market, painted by Jan Brueghel the Elder, 1603

Fish markets were known in antiquity. They served as a public space where large numbers of people could gather and discuss current events and local politics. Because seafood is quick to spoil, fish markets are historically most often found in seaside towns. Once ice or other simple cooling methods became available, some were also established in large inland cities that had good trade routes to the coast.

Since refrigeration and rapid transport became available in the 19th and 20th century, fish markets can technically be established at any place. However, because modern trade logistics in general has shifted away from marketplaces and towards retail outlets, such as supermarkets, most seafood worldwide is now sold to consumers through these venues, like most other foodstuffs. Consequently, most major fish markets now mainly deal with wholesale trade, and the existing major fish retail markets continue to operate as much for traditional reasons as for commercial ones. Both types of fish markets are often tourist attractions as well.

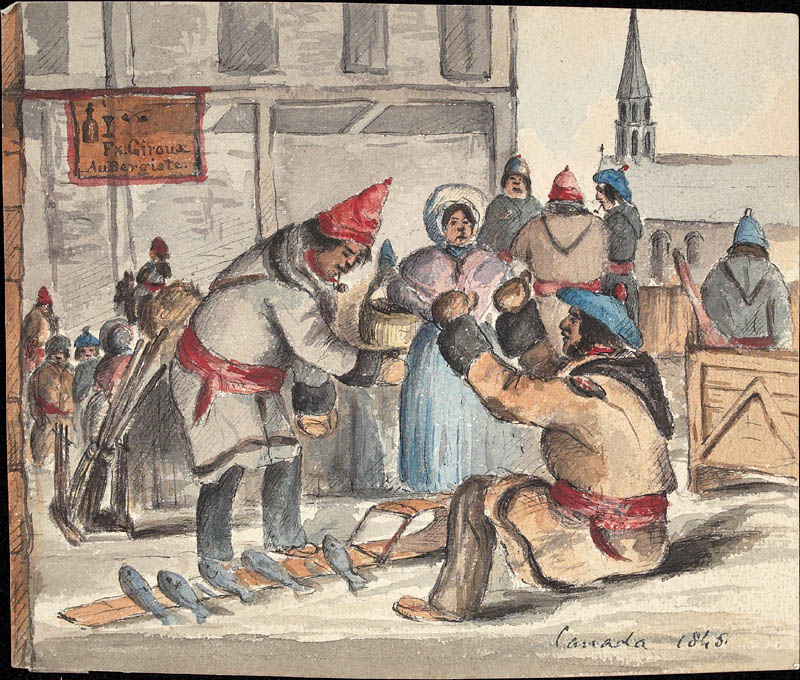
Selling fish in a Quebec Market, c. 1845

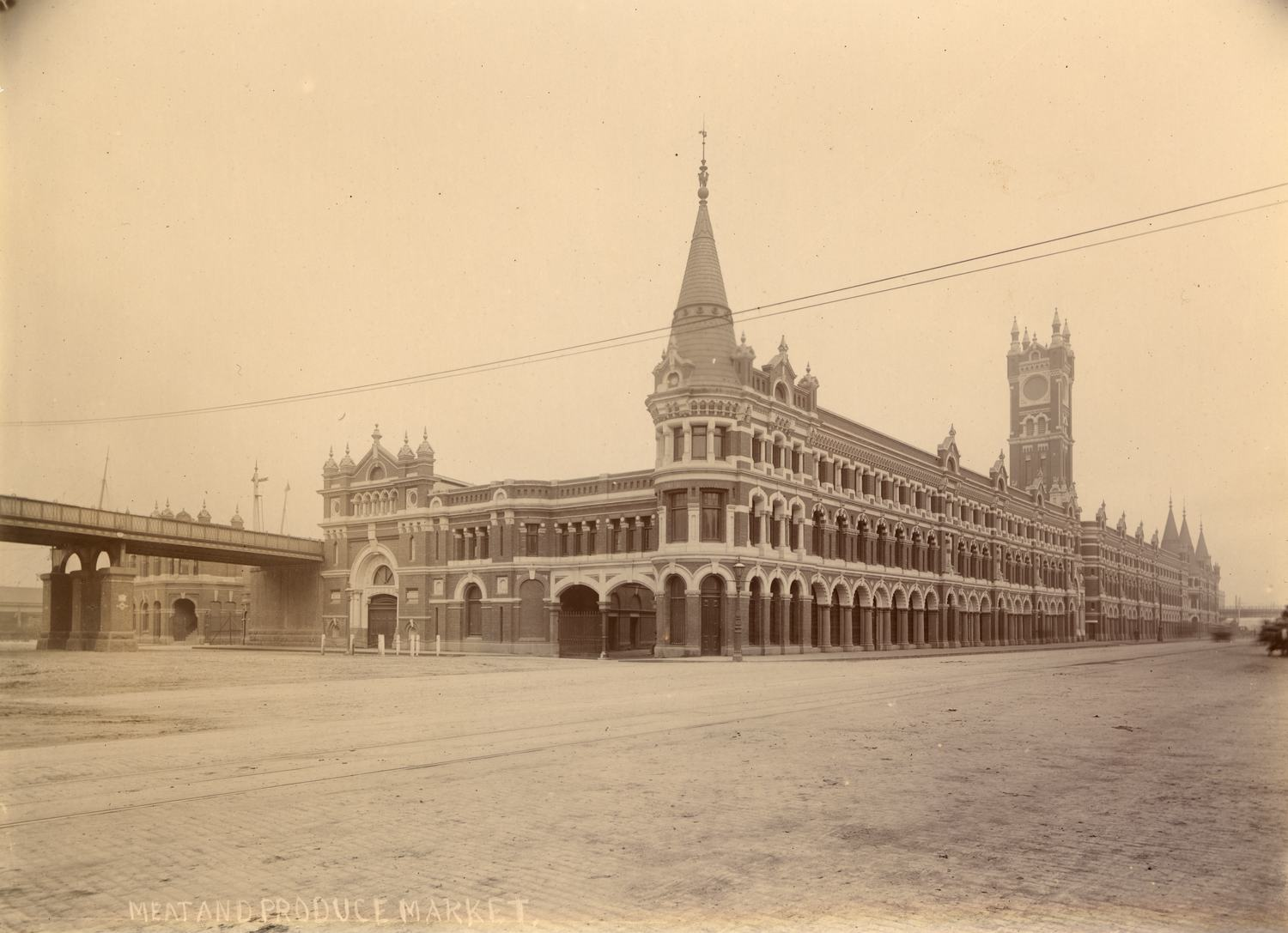
Fish Market, Melbourne, Victoria, Australia, c. 1890

== Notable fish markets ==
The following is an incomplete list of notable fish markets. (See also a list of fish market articles.)

=== Operational markets ===
- Toyosu Market, Tokyo, Japan, the world's largest fish market, replacing the former Tsukiji Market, have at least the same capacity but in up-to-date infrastructure. It opened on 11 October 2018, 5 days after Tsukiji closure (for transfer purpose).
- La Nueva Viga Market, Mexico City, Mexico; the world's second largest fish market. Marketing from 250,000 up to 550,000 tons of seafood a year.
- Sydney Fish Market, Sydney, Australia the world's third largest fish market for volume sold and second largest in terms of variety.
- Mercamadrid, Madrid, Spain; the world's fourth largest fish market, marketing about 220,000 tonnes a year.
- Baltic Herring Market, Helsinki, Finland.
- Billingsgate Fish Market, London, United Kingdom.
- Busan Cooperative Fish Market, Busan, South Korea.
- Feskekôrka, Gothenburg, Sweden.
- Fulton Fish Market, New York, United States.
- Pike Place Fish Market, Seattle, Washington, United States.
- Maine Avenue Fish Market, Washington, D.C., United States.
- Aberdeen Seafood Market, Aberdeen, Hong Kong Island, Hong Kong.
- Taipei Fish Market, Taipei, Taiwan.
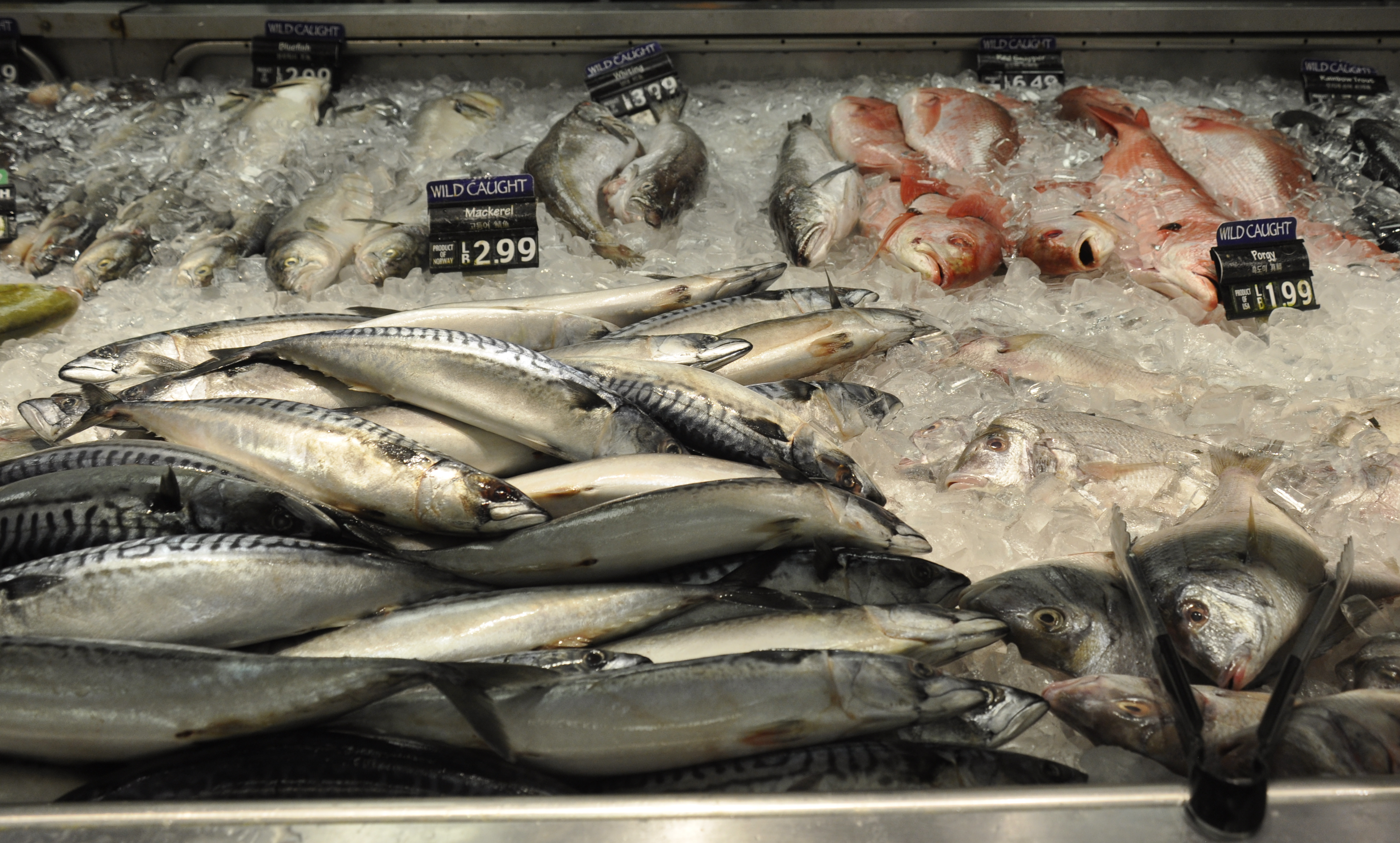
Fish department in H Mart store in Fairfax, Virginia with various types of fish

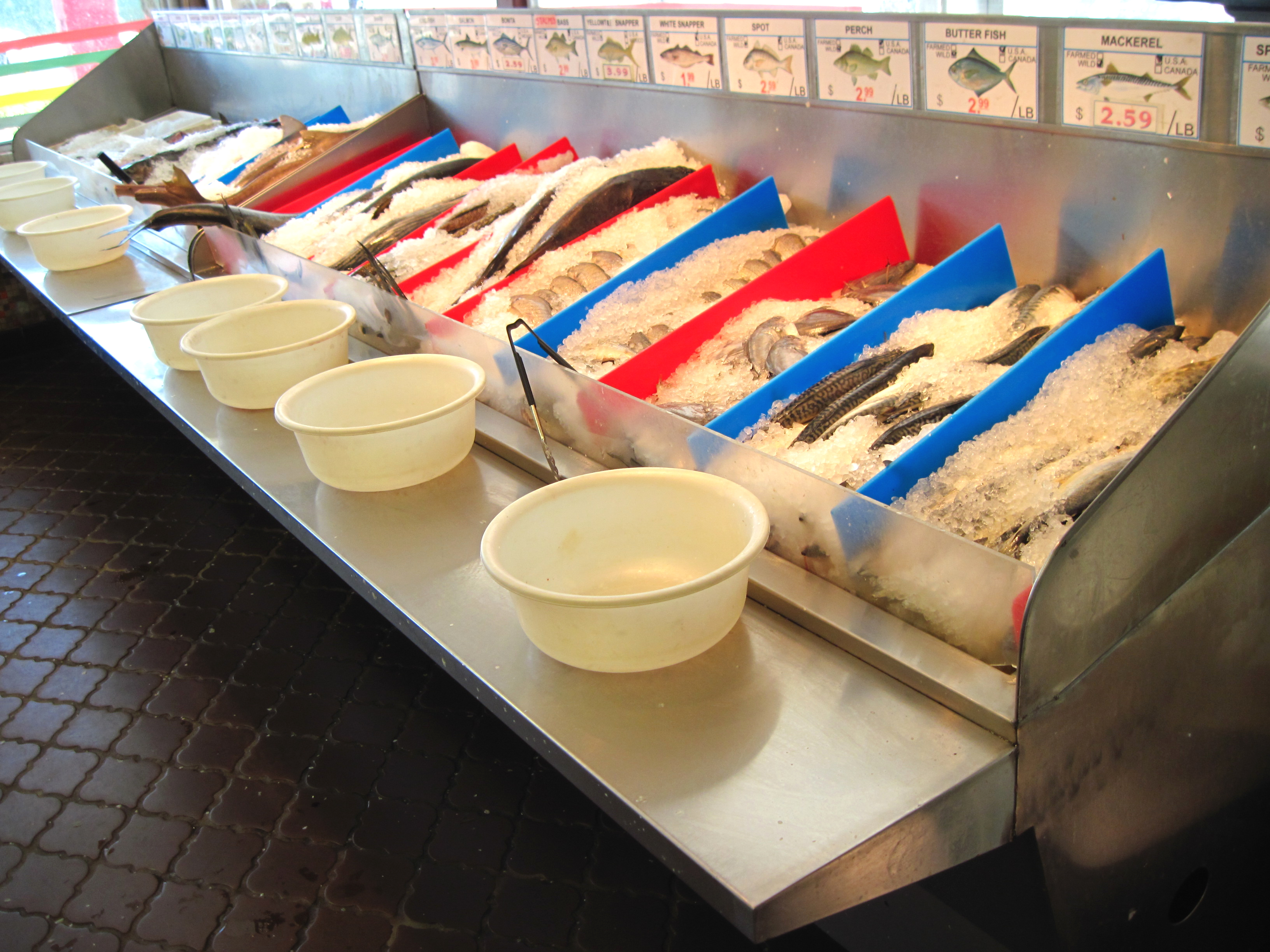
Self-serve display at a New England fish market

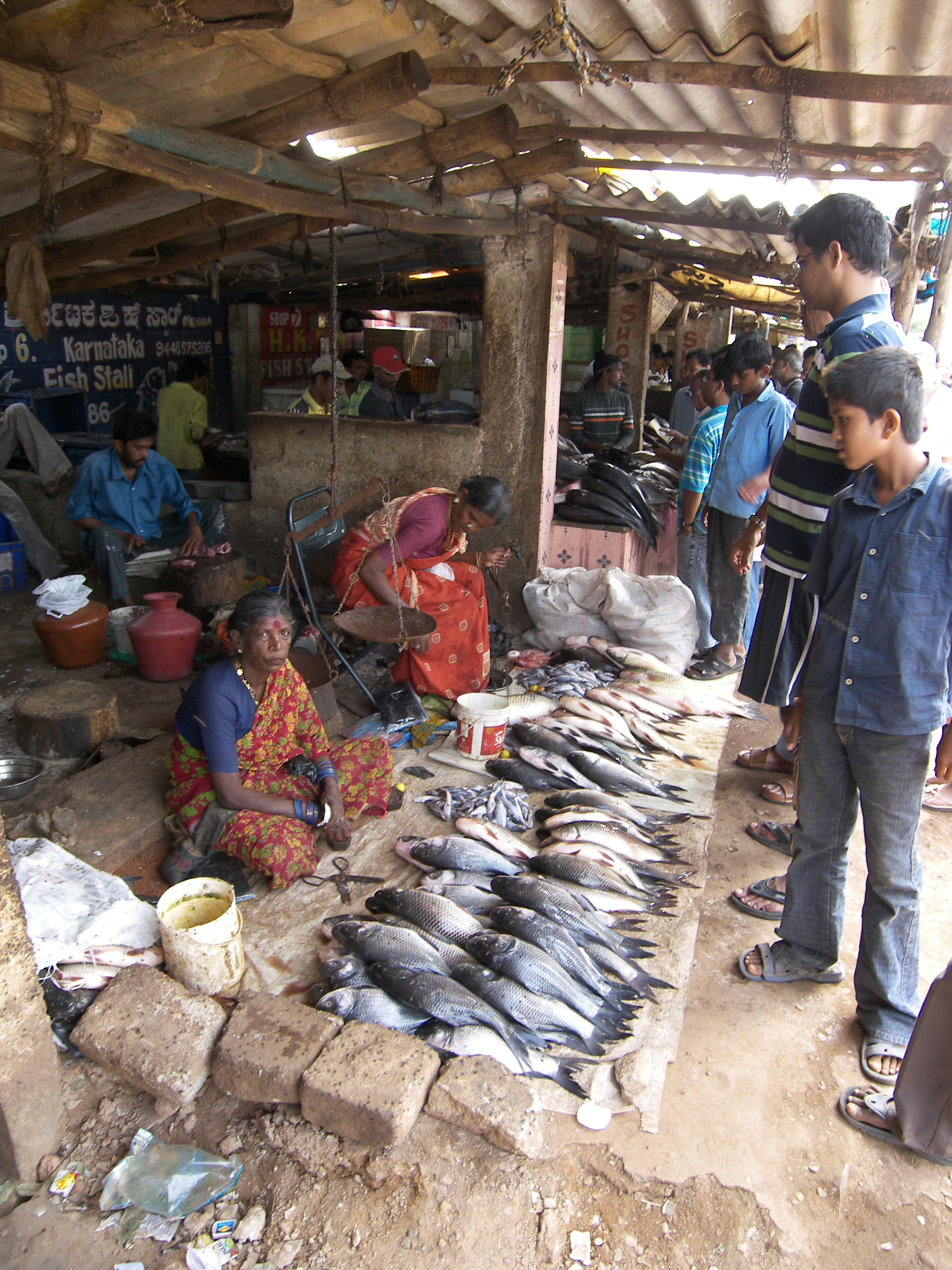
A fish stall in HAL market, Bangalore, India

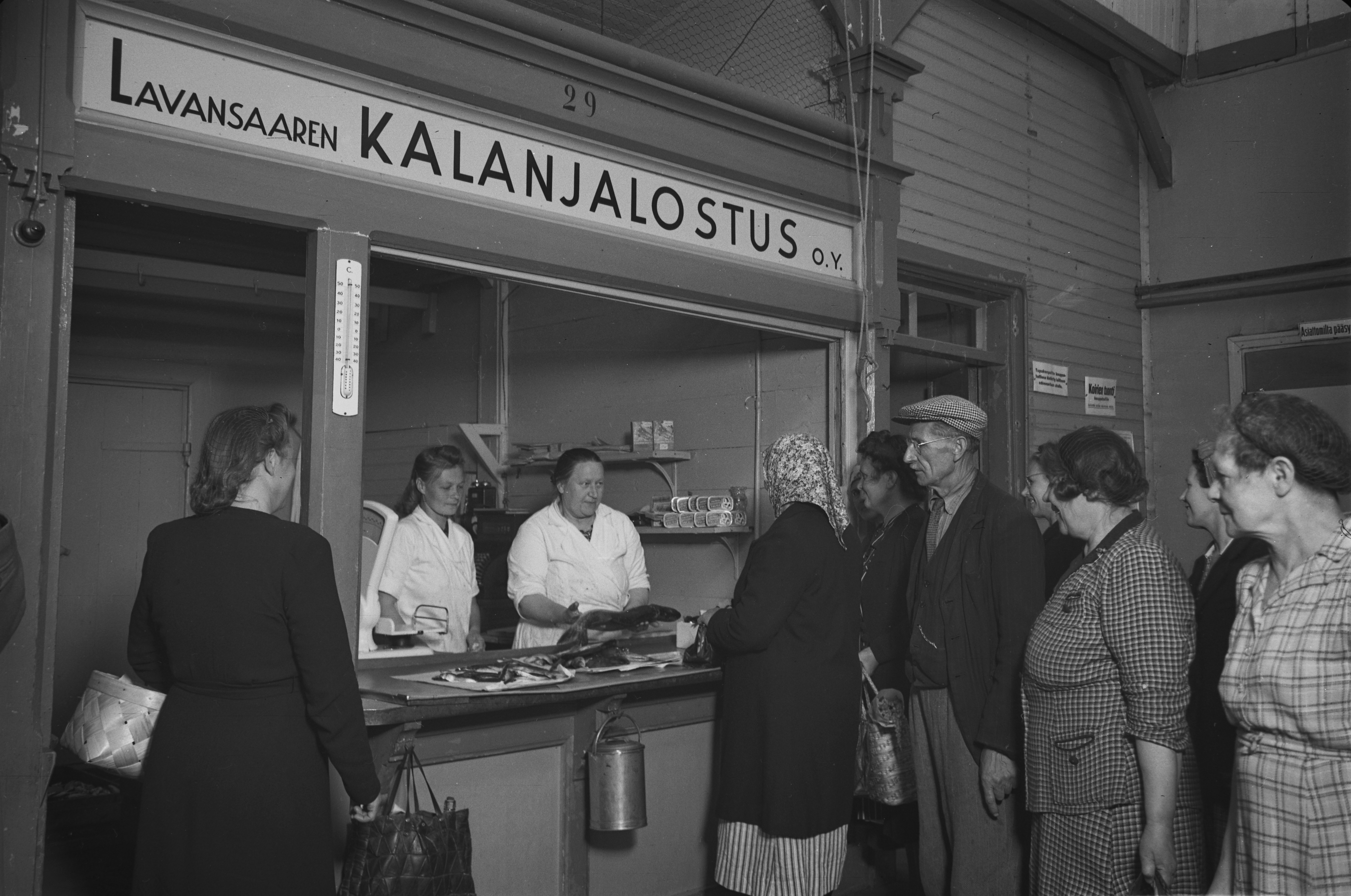
Customers in front of the in the market hall of Kotka, Finland, in 1950s

=== Historical markets ===
- Tsukiji fish market in Tokyo, Japan, was the world's largest fish market, marketing about 660,000 tonnes a year. It closed on 6 October 2018 after 83 years of operation, with most activities moving to the new Toyosu Market.
- Scania Market, a historical annual market at the Falsterbo Peninsula, Sweden
- Huanan Seafood Wholesale Market in Wuhan, China. It closed down on 1 January 2020, when it gained worldwide attention after being identified as a possible point of origin of COVID-19 and the resulting pandemic.

== See also ==
- Commercial fishing
- Fishmonger
- Fishwife
- History of fishing
- List of fish dishes
- Overfishing
- Wild fisheries
