= Street market =

Market in a public outdoor place

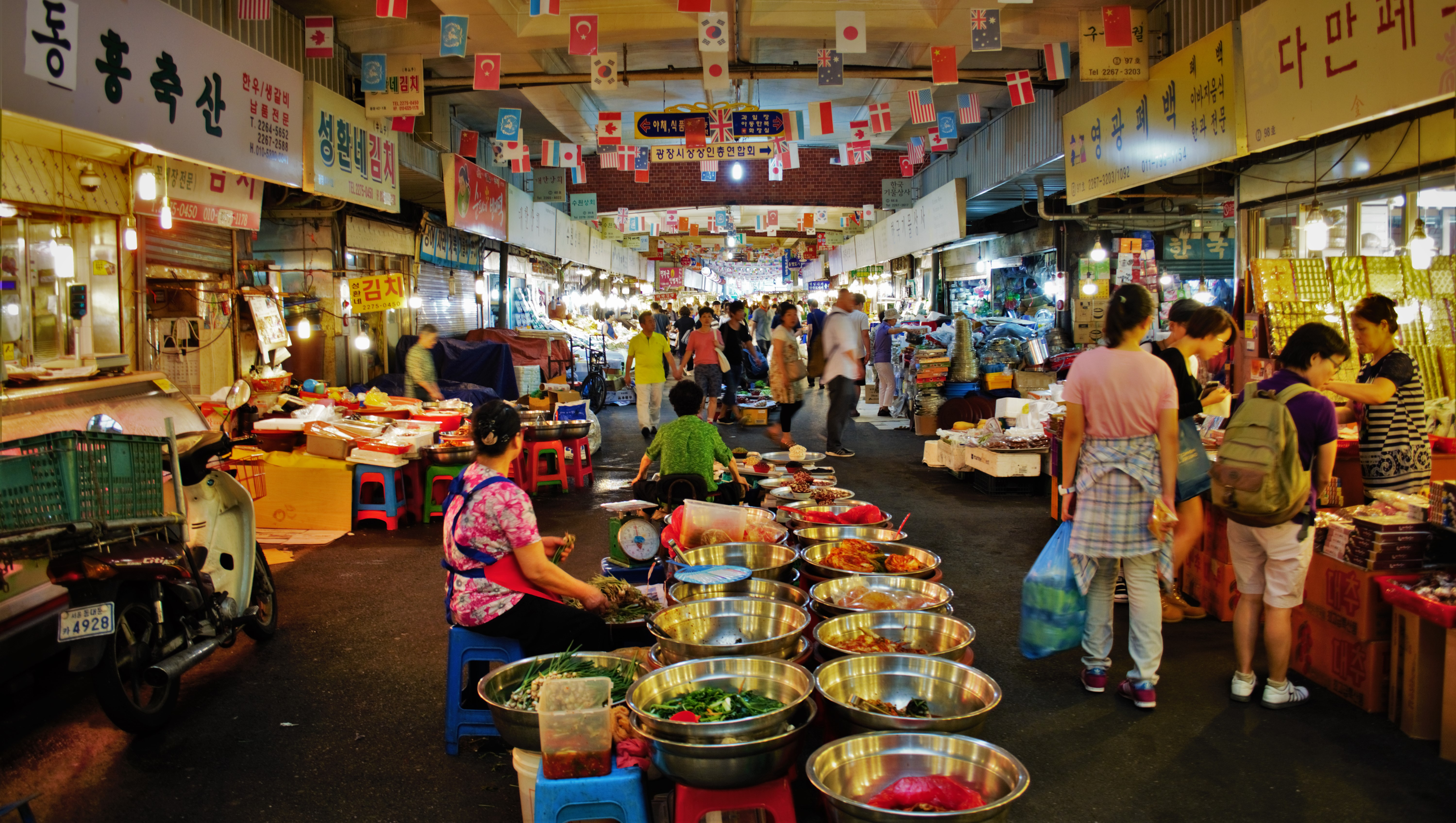
Gwangjang Market in Seoul, Korea

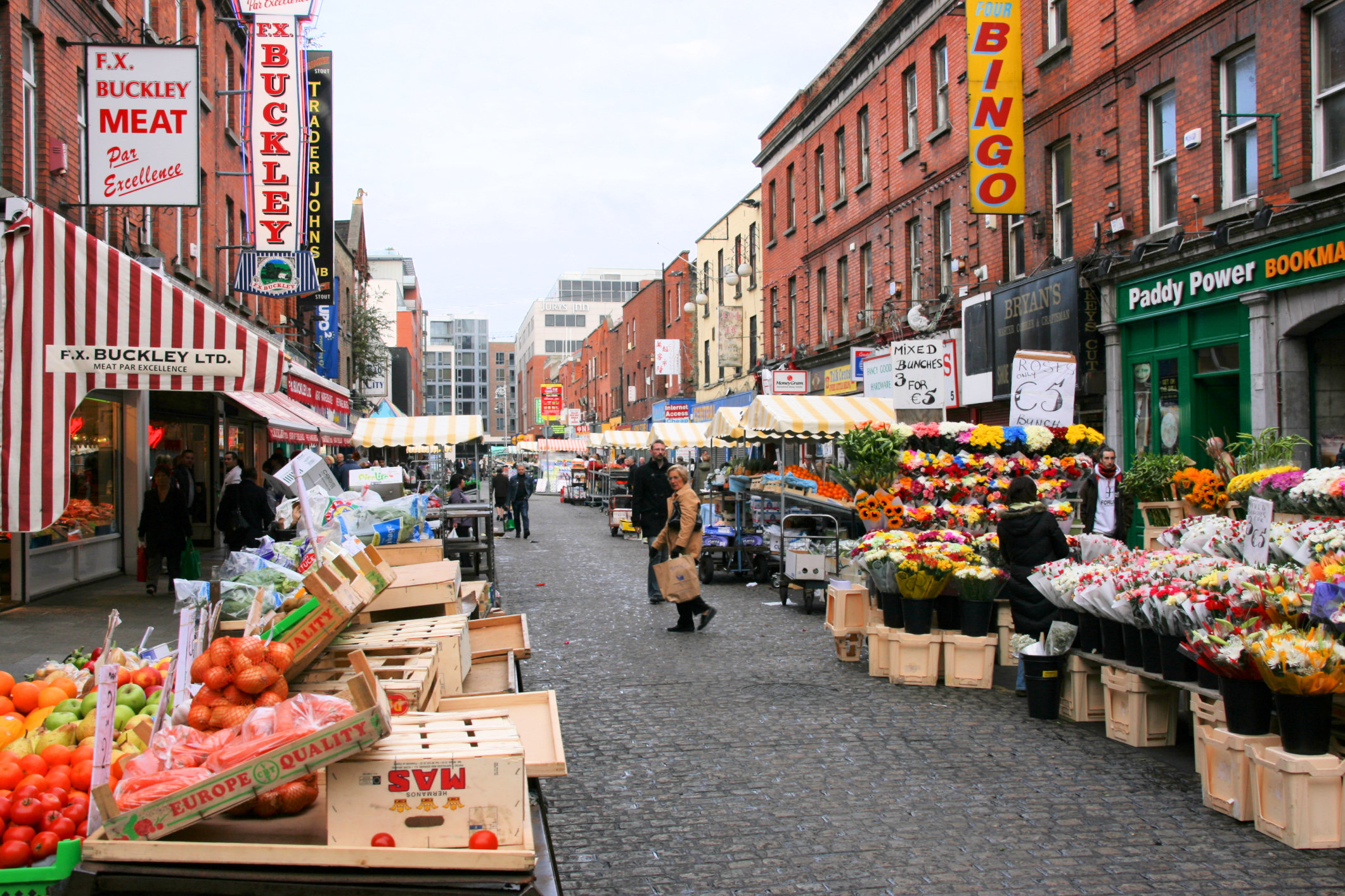
Moore Street market in Dublin, Ireland

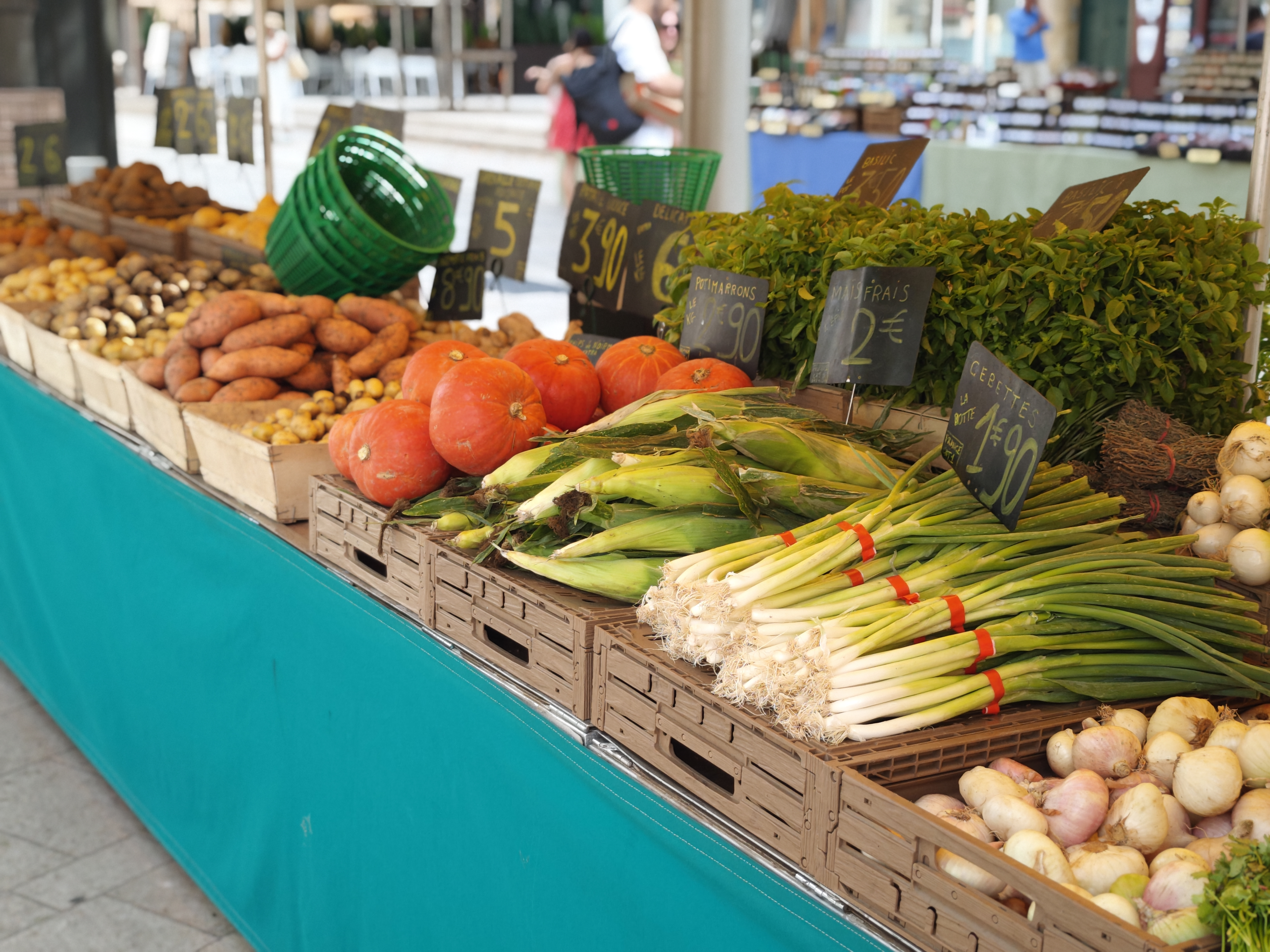
Fresh vegetables displayed for sale at an outdoor market in France.

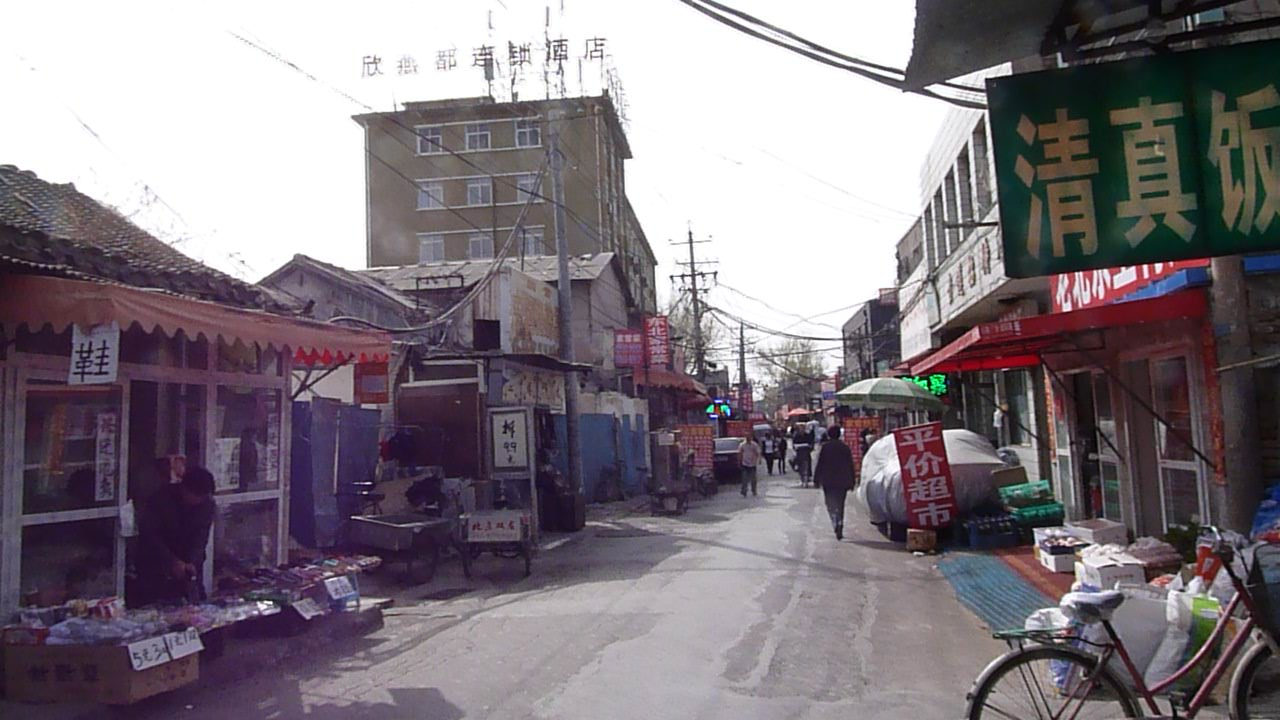
A street market in Beijing.

A street market or open-air market is a market held in an outdoor public space, such as a street, square, avenue, or parking area. Street markets may operate on particular days of the week and are commonly subject to local regulation or licensing.

Street markets vary in their organization, location, and the types of goods and services offered. They may serve local communities through the sale of food, clothing, household goods, and other products, while some have developed into tourist attractions or established commercial destinations.

This type of marketplace, has very different forms around the world, given the great variability of facilities and products offered. According to the 2015 yearbook of La Caixa, in Spain there were officially registered 17,999 street markets.

== Set-up ==
Street markets generally operate from temporary stalls, stands, or other forms of outdoor retail space. Traders may travel between different markets and assemble their stalls at designated pitches before the market opens. The organization of individual markets varies according to local regulations, the available space, the frequency of trading, and the types of goods sold.

== By country ==
=== Americas ===
Farmers' markets are usually held outdoors, in public spaces, where local farmers can sell produce to the public. They are increasing in the United States and Canada.

=== Asia ===
==== Hong Kong ====
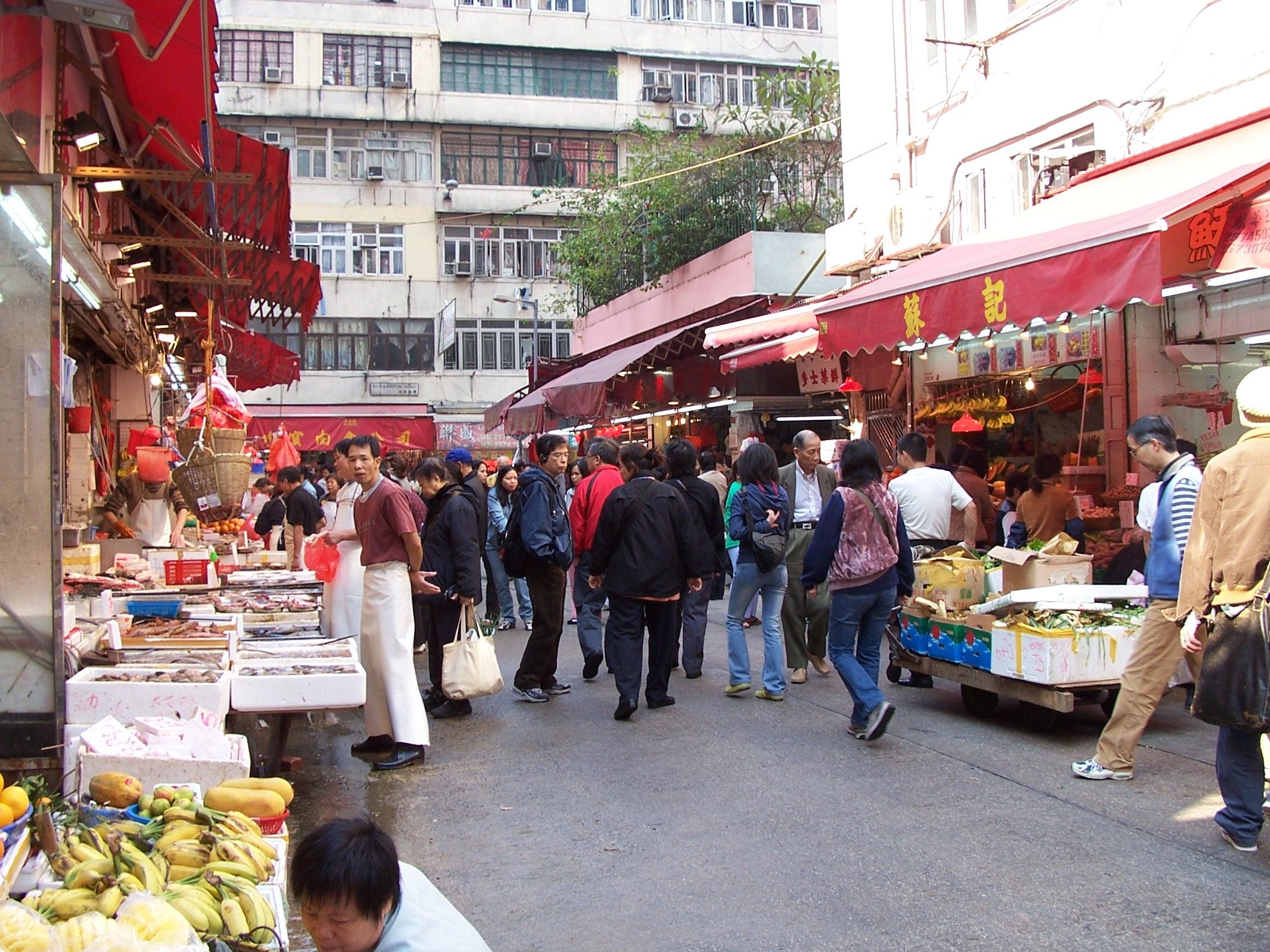
A street market in Hong Kong on Boxing Day 2006

See: markets in Hong Kong

Street markets in Hong Kong are held all the days except few traditional Chinese holidays like Chinese New Year. Stalls opened at two sides of a street were required to have licenses issued by the Hong Kong Government. In Hong Kong there are street markets of various kinds such as fresh foods, clothing, cooked foods, flowers, and even electronics. The earliest form of markets is known as Gaa si. Some of them are gradually being replaced by shopping centres, markets in municipal service buildings, and supermarkets, while some became tourist attractions like Tung Choi Street and Apliu Street.

=== Europe ===
==== Greece ====
Street markets in Greece are called laikes agores (λαϊκές αγορές) in plural, or λαϊκή αγορά (laiki agora) in singular, meaning "people's market". They are very common all over Greece, including the capital, Athens, and its suburbs. Regular (weekly) morning markets sell mostly fresh produce from farming cooperatives - fruit, vegetables, fish and flowers/plants. Some household items and prepared foods are often available.

Annual street markets (panigyri(a)) occur around churches on the day of their patron saint. These take place in the evenings and have a more festive character, often involving attractions and food stalls. The goods sold range from clothing and accessories to household items, furniture, toys and trinkets. Athens also has several bazaars/enclosed markets.

==== Turkey ====
Street markets are called shortly pazar in Turkish and usually named after the name of the day since they are only installed at around 05:00 on that specific day and ended on same day around 18:00, in every week. Every district in Turkey has its own open market where people can choose and buy from a very wide range of products, from fresh fruits and vegetables to clothing, from traditional white cheese (which some people may consider feta-like) to household items. In Istanbul area Wednesday Pazar of Fatih district, Tuesday Pazar of Kadıköy and Friday Pazar of Ortaköy are the most famous and crowded open markets of the city.

Turkey has also some very active closed or half-open markets like Kapalıçarşı or Spice Bazaar.

==== United Kingdom ====
===== Britain's market traders =====
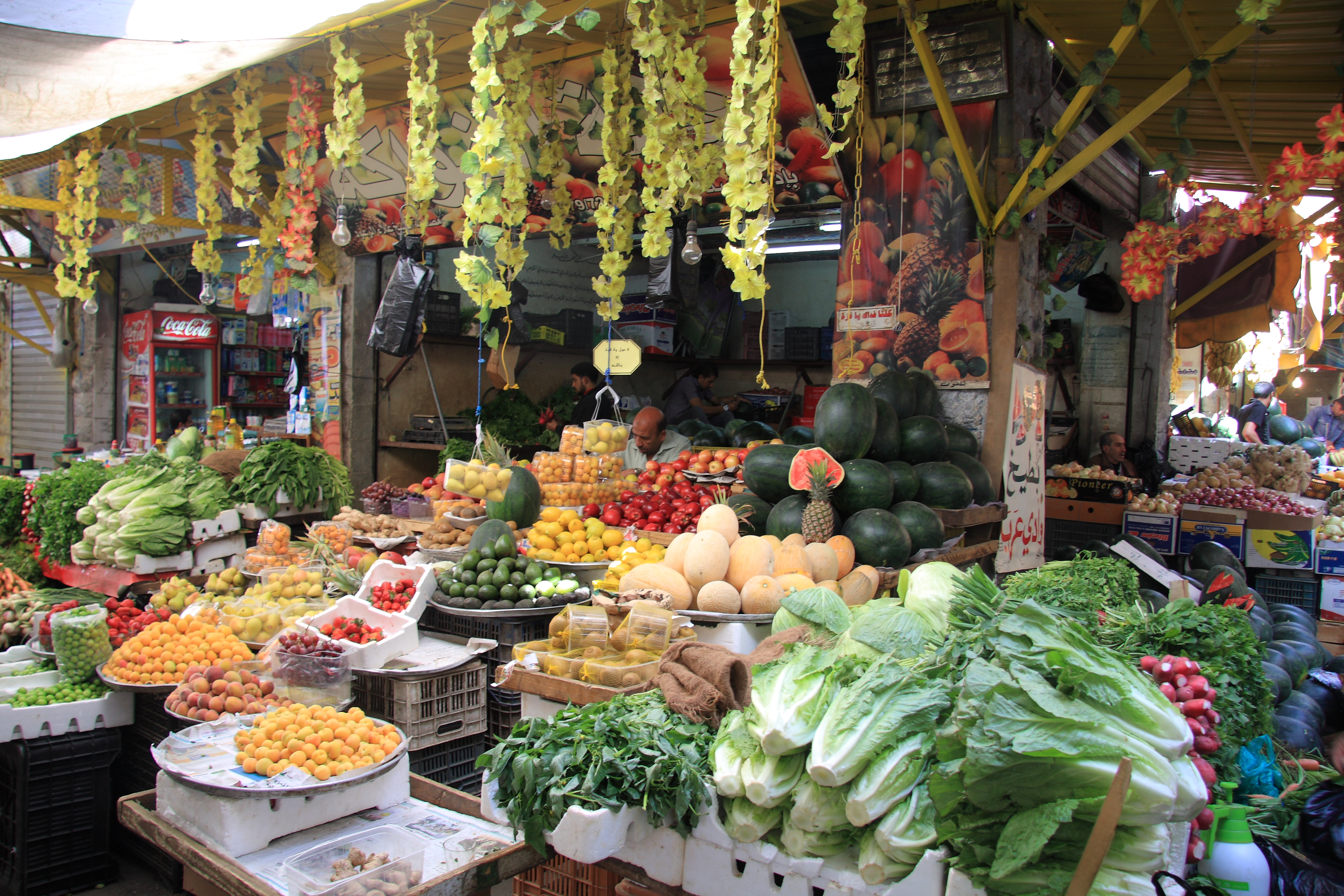
Souq in Amman, Jordan

Street trading has historically formed an important part of retail distribution in Britain. Market traders have operated from temporary stalls and pitches, selling a range of food, clothing, household goods, and other products. The development and regulation of markets varied between local authorities and changed over time as permanent shops, shopping centres, and other forms of retailing expanded.

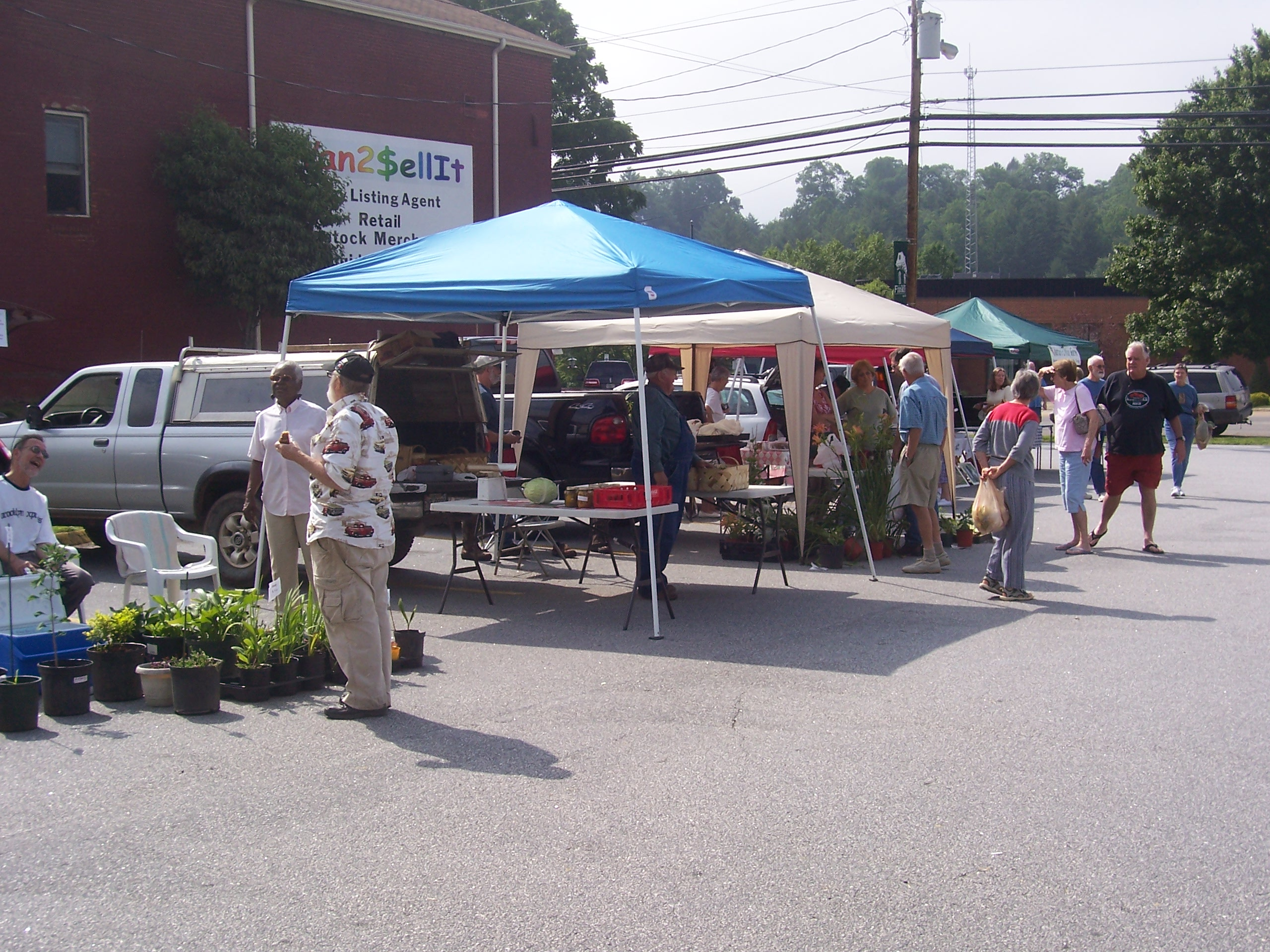
Part of the Franklin Tailgate Market, a farmer's market in Franklin, North Carolina

===== Licensing =====
Traders can be licensed to trade on a single pitch but not at a national level or when trading on private land. This has led to declining confidence in the reputation of markets. A voluntary scheme has been set up by The Market People, backed by the National Association of British Market Authorities (NABMA) to address this. It provides consumers with traceability of traders and goods as well as the ability to rate and contact the traders. A MarketPASS is issued to an operator or Trader once they have provided proof of identity, insurance and, where required, a hygiene certificate.

===== England's chartered markets and fairs =====
Many of the older historic markets carry a "charter" which gives that particular market certain rights and protection. For example, another market can't be held on the same day within a certain distance of a "chartered market". These were awarded by kings to markets and fairs all over England, and to this day are guarded by market traders and showmen.

===== London =====
See: markets in London

Some examples of street markets include Berwick Street Market, Broadway Market, Camden Market, East Street Market, Petticoat Lane and Portobello Road Market. The most popular for food is Borough Market which sell most fresh produce as well as having a bakery.

== See also ==
- Arcade
- Bazaar
- Braderie: a type of grand yearly street fair and market, held mostly in the summer in the Netherlands, Belgium, and northern France.
- Market
- Night market
- Night markets in Taiwan
- Pasar malam: a street market in Indonesia, Malaysia, and Singapore that opens in the evening, usually in residential neighbourhoods.
- Souk: an open-air marketplace or commercial quarter in Middle Eastern and North African cities.
- Tianguis: open air market that is traditionally held on certain market days in Mexico and Central America.
- Wet market: sells fresh meat, fish and produce. See also dry goods.
