= Yaeum-dong =

Neighborhood in Ulsan, South Korea

Coordinates: 35.525°N 129.333°E

- In 2005
- Interactive map of Yaeum-dong
- Country: South Korea
- Region: Ulsan

Area
  - Total: 1.60 km^{2} (0.62 sq mi)

Korean name
- Hangul: 야음동
- Hanja: 也音洞
- RR: Yaeum-dong
- MR: Yaŭm-dong

Yaeum-dong (Korean: 야음동) was a dong, or neighborhood, of Nam-gu in Ulsan, South Korea. Yaeum-dong was originally subdivided into 3 smaller districts: Yaeum 1-Jangsaengpo-dong, Yaeum 2-dong, and Yaeum 3-dong. In 2007, Yaeum 1-Jangsaengpo-dong was renamed Yaeum-Jangsaengpo-dong, Yaeum 2-dong was renamed Daehyeon-dong, and Yaeum 3-dong was renamed Suam-dong.

== See also ==
- Yaeum market
