= Daehyun Elementary School =

Primary school in Ulsan, South Korea

- 대현초등학교

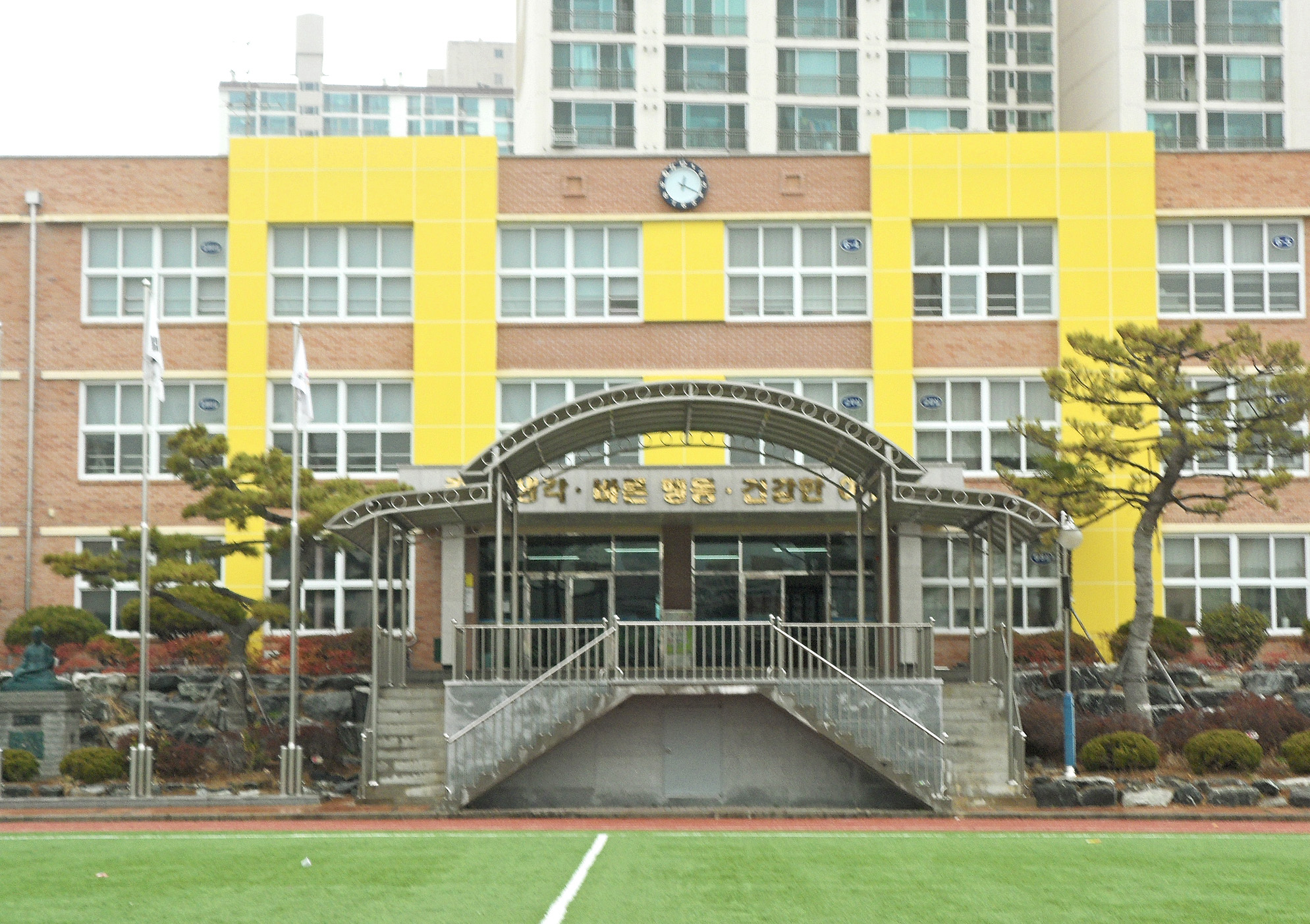
- Front entrance of school

Location
- 687-2 Yaeum-dong (165-3 Suam-ro) Nam-gu; Ulsan; South Korea
- Coordinates: 35.528°N 129.325°E

Information
- School type: Public elementary
- Founded: 8 July 1925
- Status: Open
- School board: Ulsan Metropolitan Office of Education
- Principal: Im Gil-yeop (임길엽)
- Faculty: 78
- Teaching staff: 32
- Grades: K to 6
- Enrollment: 962 (2013)
  - Kindergarten: 49
  - Grade 1: 134
  - Grade 2: 144
  - Grade 3: 153
  - Grade 4: 148
  - Grade 5: 139
  - Grade 6: 181
  - Other: 14
- Classes: 39
- Average class size: 26.7
- Student to teacher ratio: ~25:1
- Language: Korean
- Hours in school day: 5.5
- Classrooms: 41
- Area: 17,494 square metres (188,300 sq ft)
- Website: daehyun.es.kr

Daehyun Elementary School (Korean: 대현초등학교; Hanja: 大峴初等學校; RR: Daehyeon chodeung hakgyo) is a public elementary school located in Daehyeon-dong, Nam District, Ulsan, South Korea. There are 962 students from kindergarten to the sixth grade at Daehyun during the 2013–2014 school year. About 80 teachers and other faculty are employed at Daehyun including workers completing their mandatory military service and one native-English-speaking teacher.

Daehyun has also been used as a high school academy after regular class hours. High school students receive credit towards their certificates for completing classes at Daehyun such as math, science, and English. Additionally, high school students work as mentors to elementary school students during summer and winter break to receive additional credit.

The school was founded on 8 July 1925 and was relocated to its current location on 1 March 1973.

== School symbols ==
The school's logo is a check mark inside of a cog wheel and symbolizes wisdom and health.

The school's flower is the chrysanthemum, symbolizing truth, purity, and cleanliness.

The school's tree is the ginkgo tree.

== Academics ==
At Daehyun, students study many subjects, including: Korean, English, Chinese characters, math, social studies, science, computers, art, physical education, music, health, ethics, and home economics.

There are programs to help students with learning disabilities as well as gifted students who need more challenging work.

== Teams and activities ==
Daehyun's baseball team is the only official sports team at the school. The team was created in 1986 and they have won first in three regional tournaments since then. Daehyun is the only elementary school in Ulsan that has a baseball team, and because of this, Daehyun has become a necessary school to attend if a student has hopes of becoming a career player. Some students even commute from outside the city to attend.

Daehyun's unofficial teams include: volleyball, soccer, basketball, badminton, ping-pong, dodge ball, tennis, track & field and jump rope.

After-school activities for Daehyun students include: piano, violin, recorder, danso, dance, cross stitching, reading club, art club, English drama club, Korean drama club, and computer club.

== Special events ==
Every year, Daehyun students participate in special events including sports day in the spring and the Daehyun talent show at the end of the school year.

One day every month, the students are encouraged not to waste any food at lunch, and are given stickers if they can finish all of their food.

Every Thursday is "Delicious Lunch Day" at the school where the students get an extra-delicious lunch at the school cafeteria.

== Notable occasions ==
The gymnasium opened for the first time on 26 October 2004. A new sports field was completed in 2012 and is used by the school's baseball and track & field teams. Baseball teams from other schools and cities come to Daehyun Elementary for tournaments because it is the only school in Ulsan with a baseball team and a quality playing field.

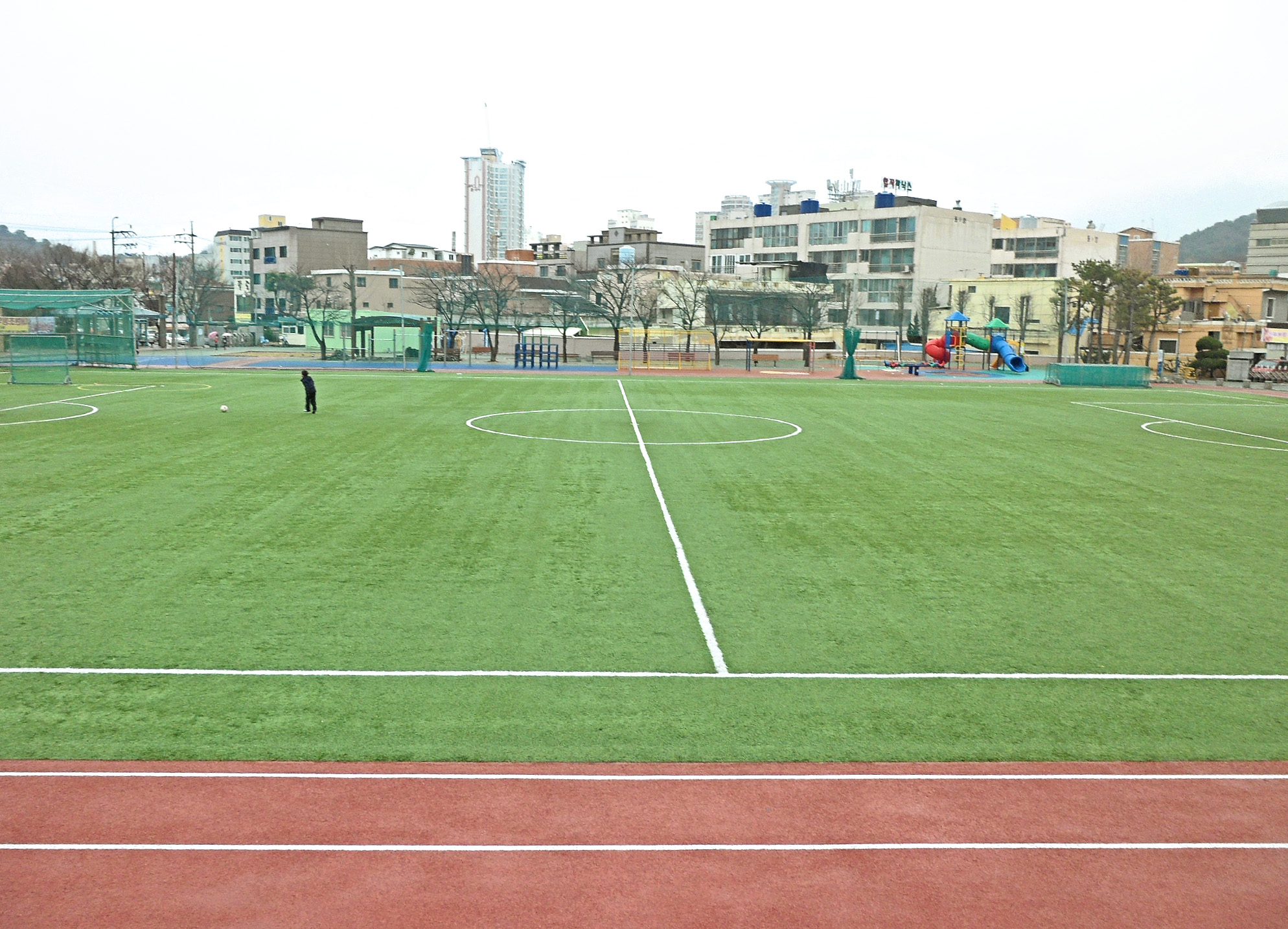
New sports field completed in 2012

== Notable people ==
Bae Eun-hye (배은혜), a physical-education teacher at Daehyun until 2013, won a silver medal in the 2006 Doha Asian Games for the women's 70 kg judo event.

Jeong Ju-hyeon (정주현), a center fielder and second baseman for Sangmu Baseball Team, attended Daehyun Elementary.

Jun Won-tchack (전원책), a South Korean writer and broadcaster, graduated from Daehyun Elementary in 1966.

== See also ==
- Education in South Korea
