= Ulsan Munsu Football Stadium =

Football stadium in Ulsan, South Korea

- Big Crown
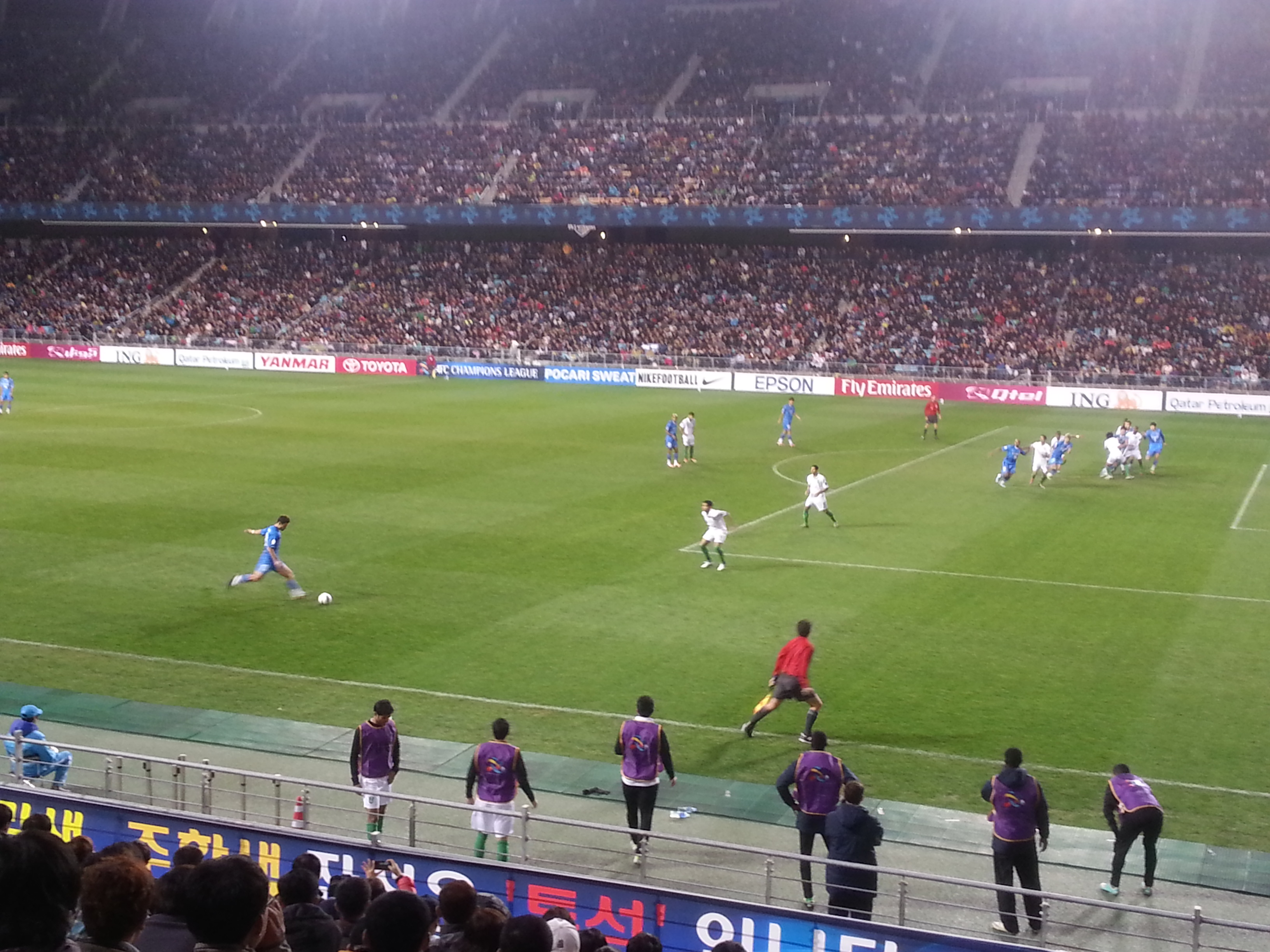
- Ulsan Munsu Football Stadium in 2012
- Interactive map of Ulsan Munsu Football Stadium
- Location: San 5-1, Ok-dong, Nam-gu, Ulsan, South Korea
- Coordinates: 35°32′07″N 129°15′34″E
- Owner: Ulsan Metropolitan City Hall
- Operator: Ulsan Facilities Corporation
- Capacity: 37,897
- Surface: Grass

Construction
- Groundbreaking: 18 December 1998
- Opened: 28 April 2001; 25 years ago
- Cost: ₩151.4 billion

Tenant
- Ulsan HD (2001–present)

The Ulsan Munsu Football Stadium (Korean: 울산문수축구경기장) is a football stadium in Ulsan, South Korea with a capacity for 37,897 spectators. Since its opening in 2001, it has been the home ground of K League 1 team Ulsan HD.

The stadium was built from 18 December 1998 to 28 April 2001 at a total cost of 151.4 billion won (US$116.5 million).

== International matches ==
The venue hosted three matches at the 2002 FIFA World Cup.

Date	Team 1	Result	Team 2	Round	Attendance
1 June 2002	Uruguay	1–2	Denmark	Group A	30,157
3 June 2002	Brazil	2–1	Turkey	Group C	33,842
21 June 2002	Germany	1–0	United States	Quarter-finals	37,337

== See also ==
- List of football stadiums in South Korea
