= Daewangam Park =

Park in Ulsan, South Korea

- Interactive map of Daewangam Park
- Location: Dong-gu, Ulsan, South Korea
- Coordinates: 35.4924°N 129.4395°E
- Website: daewangam.donggu.ulsan.kr

Korean name
- Hangul: 대왕암공원
- Hanja: 大王巖公園
- RR: Daewangam gongwon
- MR: Taewangam kongwŏn

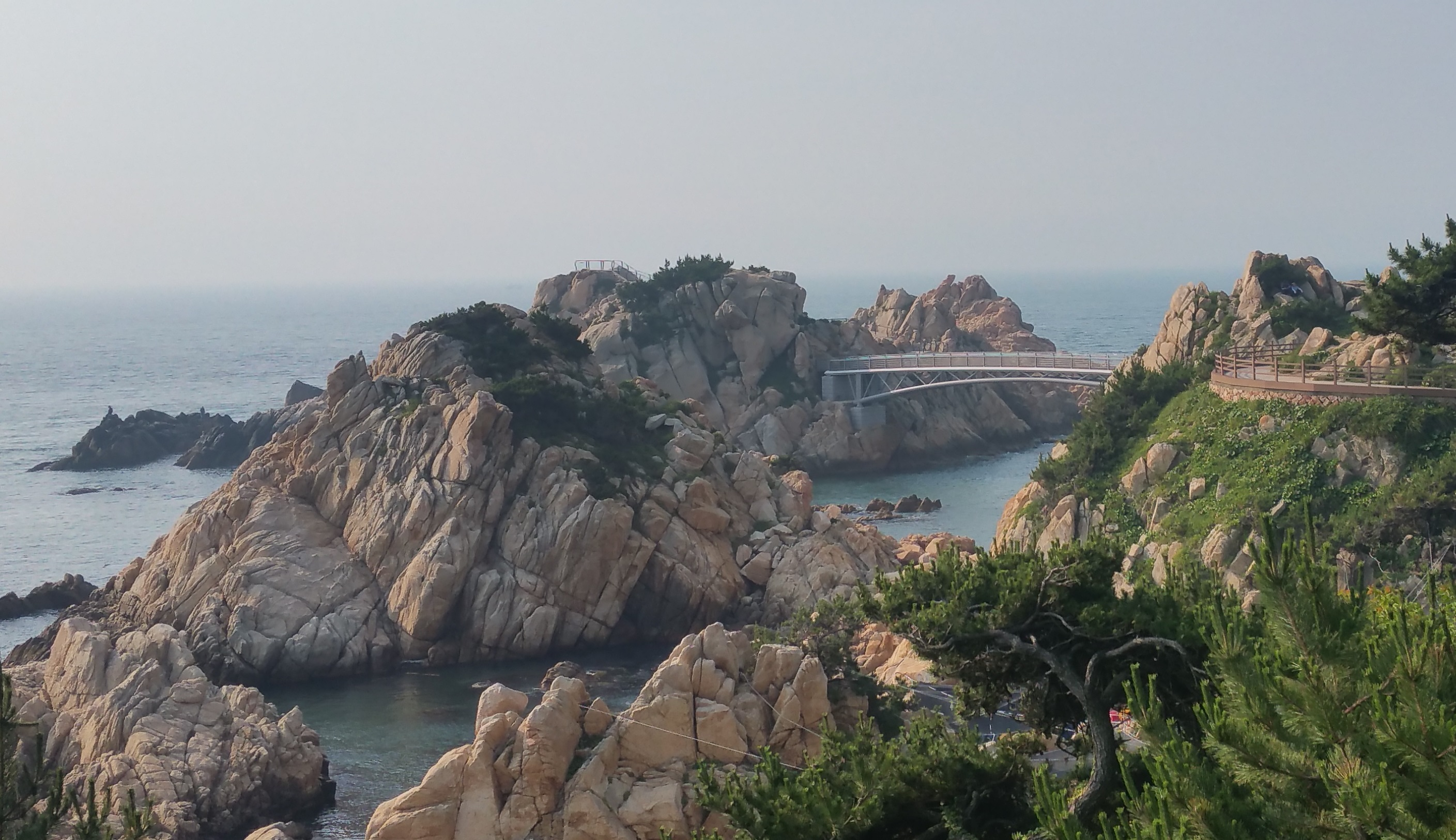
Day view of Daewangam Park

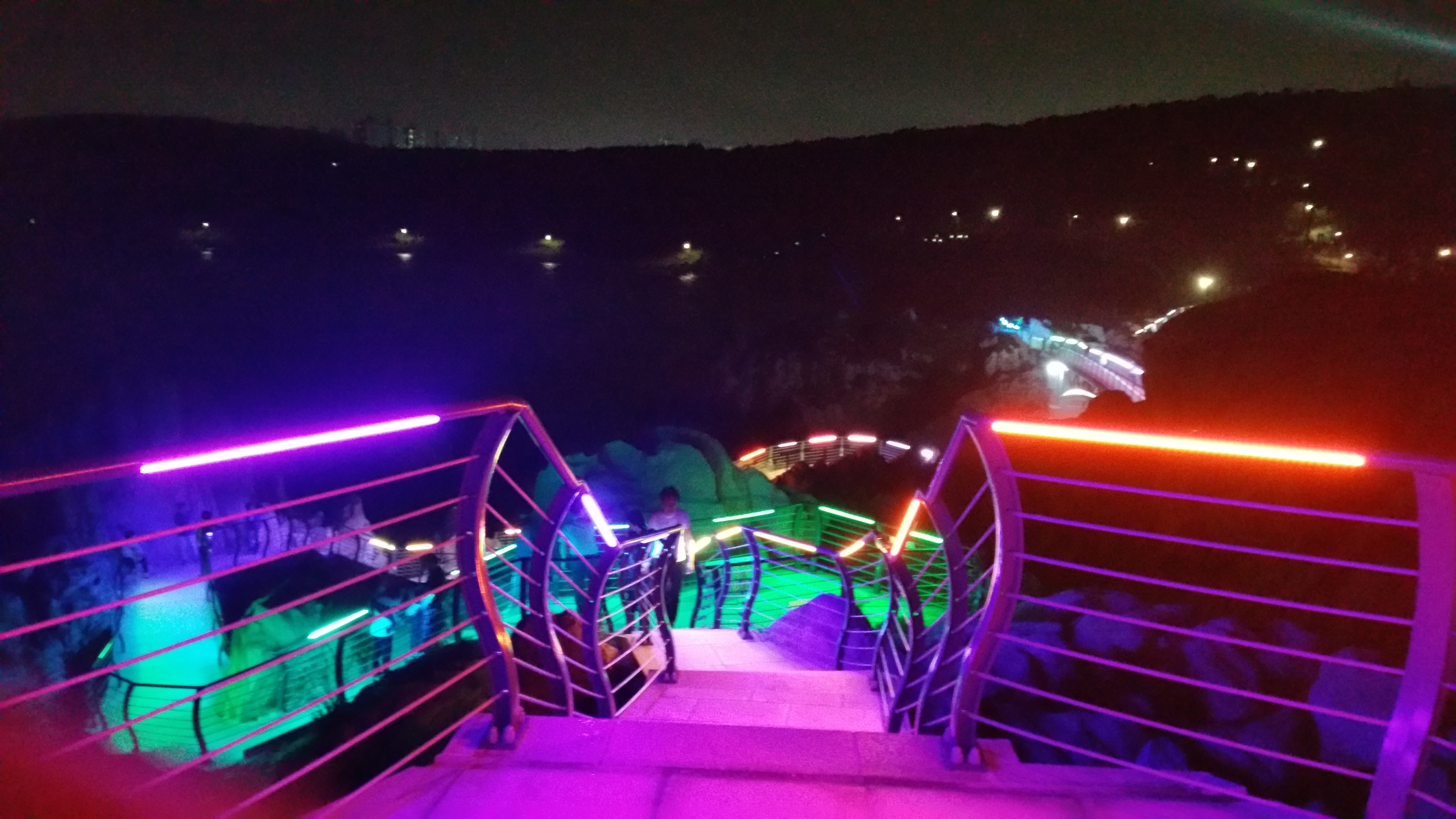
Night view of Daewangam Park

Daewangam Park (Korean: 대왕암공원) is a park in Ilsan, Dong District, Ulsan, South Korea. The total area covers 942,000 square metres (10,140,000 sq ft), and there is a sand field in Ilsan Beach next to the park. Daewangam Park is famous for its lighthouse the guidance of the 'Ulgi'. From the entrance to the park to the lighthouse, there is a 600-meter-long pine forest spanning. On the beaches of Daewangam Park, there are huge boulders of rock formations that look like prehistoric dinosaur fossils are lying down. At the end of the park, there is Daewangam. Daegwanggyo Bridge, which connects land and Daewangam, was built and donated by Hyundai Heavy Industries Co. in 1995.

The Daewangam Moonlight Festival has been held since 2012. This festival is a representative cultural event of Ulsan Dong-gu, which is held every year since 2012. Usually, it opens at Daewangam Park during the evening of September to October. In 2017, the event was titled 'The Hundred Years of Light meets the Thausand Years of Sound.' It is performed various cultural performances such as Si-nangsong, dance, and singing. And after the performances, 'Walking along the moonlight' is proceed. There are about 1000 participants attending the event.

And Daewangam Solbaramgil walking festival has been held in 2017. It is a walking festival hosted by Ulsan Dong-gu, the theme of "Let's be drunk with the scent of pine trees and waves." The walking course is 4.1 km long and walks from Daewangam Park to nearby Ilsan beach. Around 1,300 people attend this walk festival.

== Relevant legends ==
This Daewangam has a legend about the 'Queen of Munmu', the Silla Dynasty. The Queen of Munmu died after her husband (King Munmu)'s death. And she reportedly was lost at sea to become a dragon to protect donghae.

== See also ==
- Yeongnam Alps
- Jangsaengpo Whale museum
- Ulsan Grand Park
- Ganjeolgot
