= Hamwolsan =

Mountain in South Korea

Highest point
- Elevation: 200 m (660 ft)
- Coordinates: 35°30′36″N 129°19′05″E

Geography
- Location: Ulsan, South Korea

Korean name
- Hangul: 함월산
- Hanja: 含月山
- RR: Hamwolsan
- MR: Hamwŏlsan

Hamwolsan (Korean: 함월산) is a mountain bordering Seonam Lake Park in Nam District, Ulsan, South Korea. It has an elevation of 200 m (656 ft).

== See also ==
- Geography of Korea
- List of mountains in Korea
- List of mountains by elevation
