= Ulsan Munsu Baseball Stadium =

South Korean baseball stadium

- Interactive map of Ulsan Munsu Baseball Stadium
- Location: 5 Ok-dong, Nam-gu, Ulsan, South Korea
- Coordinates: 35.53195°N 129.26615°E
- Owner: City of Ulsan
- Capacity: 12,088
- Surface: Artificial turf
- Field size: Left Field – 101 metres (331 ft); Center – 122 metres (400 ft); Right Field – 101 metres (331 ft)

Construction
- Groundbreaking: 28 September 2012
- Opened: 22 March 2014
- Cost: 45 billion won
- Builders: POSCO A&C

Tenants
- Lotte Giants (KBO League) (2014–present) (Part-time); Ulsan Whales (KBO Futures League) (2026–present)

- Ulsan Munsu Baseball Stadium
- Hangul: 울산문수야구장
- Hanja: 蔚山文殊野球場
- RR: Ulsan Munsu yagujang
- MR: Ulsan Munsu yagujang

Ulsan Baseball Stadium (Korean: 울산문수야구장) is a baseball stadium in Ok-dong, Ulsan, South Korea. The stadium has an all-seated capacity of 12,088. It serves as the second home of the Lotte Giants.
