= Ulsan Culture & Arts Center =

Building in Ulsan, South Korea

- Interactive map of Ulsan Culture & Arts Center
- Former names: Jonghap Munhwa Yesul Hoekwan (종합문화예술회관; 1995–1997)
- Location: Dal-dong, Nam-gu, Ulsan, South Korea
- Coordinates: 35.54292°N 129.32730°E

Construction
- Built: 1990–1995
- Opened: 5 October 1995

Website
- ucac.ulsan.go.kr

Korean name
- Hangul: 울산문화예술회관
- Hanja: 蔚山文化藝術會館
- RR: Ulsan munhwa yesul hoegwan
- MR: Ulsan munhwa yesul hoegwan

Ulsan Culture & Arts Center is an arts center located in Dal-dong, Nam-gu, Ulsan, South Korea. Construction of the building began in 1990 and the center opened on 5 October 1995. It was previously named the Jonghap Culture & Arts Center (Korean: 종합문화예술회관) but was renamed in 1997. It is the site of the annual Cheoyong Culture Festival, which accompanies the Ulsan World Music Festival and the Asia Pacific Music Meeting.

== Facilities ==
The center has 3 above-ground floors, and 2 basement floors with a total of 14,567 square metres (156,800 square feet) of floor space.

=== Large theatre ===
The grand theatre has a capacity of 1,484 people. There is an orchestra pit and a revolving stage that can be raised or lowered. It is used for many types of performances, including opera, ballet, musicals and general theatre.

=== Small theatre ===
The small theatre has 472 seats and is used for chamber music performances and theater and dance performances that require only a small, open space.

=== Outdoor theatre ===
There is an outdoor theatre that can seat up to 650 people and is used for traditional art performances and general musical performances.

=== Exhibition hall ===
Four exhibition halls are used to display paintings, sculptures, calligraphy, photography, crafts, and other exhibits.

=== Other facilities ===
There is a crèche for audiences with children, a cafeteria, rehearsal halls and rooms, and an information kiosk to assist with visitor questions. Parking is available on site.

== See also ==
- List of South Korean tourist attractions
