= Ulsan Science Museum =

- Established: 30 March 2011
- Location: Ok-dong, Nam-gu, Ulsan, South Korea
- Coordinates: 35.5396°N 129.2679°E
- Type: Science museum
- Parking: On site
- Website: usm.go.kr

Korean name
- Hangul: 울산 과학 박물관
- Hanja: 蔚山 科學 博物館
- RR: Ulsan gwahak bangmulgwan
- MR: Ulsan kwahak pangmulgwan

Ulsan Science Museum (Korean: 울산과학박물관) is a science museum located in Ok-dong, Nam-gu, Ulsan, South Korea. Established in 2011, the museum has an area of 41,000 square metres (440,000 square feet) spread out over 6 floors. There is space for several exhibitions, a planetarium, and science labs and classrooms for educational courses. The exhibitions are almost entirely in Korean, but there are also English programs available for visiting schools.

== See also ==
- List of museums in South Korea
- List of South Korean tourist attractions
- Jangsaengpo Whale Museum
- Ulsan Museum
