= Seonam Lake Park =

Park in Ulsan, South Korea

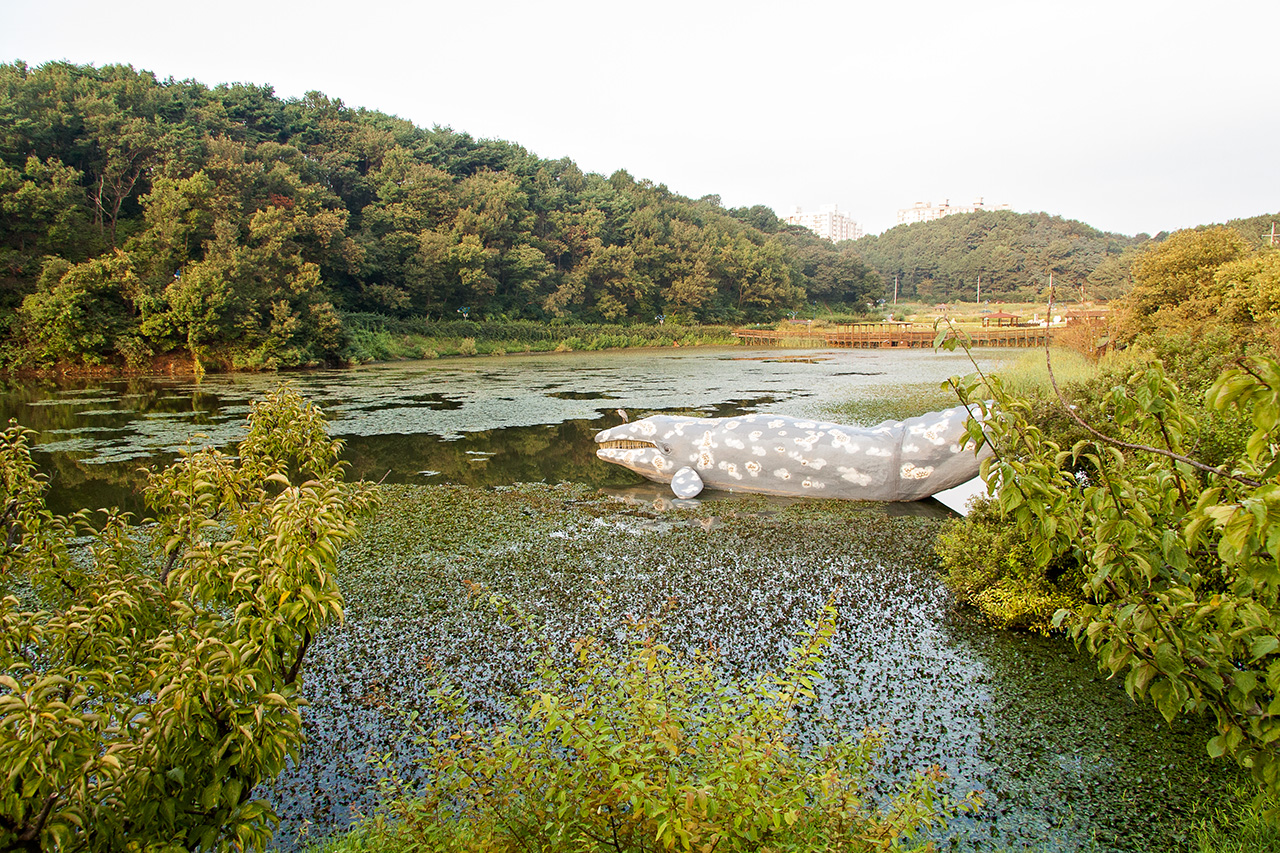
- Seonam Lake
- Interactive map of Seonam Lake Park
- Type: Urban park
- Location: Seonam-dong, Nam-gu, Ulsan, South Korea
- Coordinates: 35.51675°N 129.32648°E
- Created: 2007
- Website: seonamlp.ulsannamgu.go.kr

- Seonam Lake Park
- Hangul: 선암호수공원
- Hanja: 仙岩湖水公園
- RR: Seonam hosu gongwon
- MR: Sŏnam hosu kongwŏn

Seonam Lake Park is an urban park next to Hamwolsan in Seonam-dong, Nam-gu, Ulsan, South Korea. The park was previously named Sunam Dam Park (선암댐공원) because of the large C-shaped dammed lake in the center of the park. There are approximately 4 kilometres (2.5 miles) of walking trails around the lake, a rose garden, a lotus pond, a soccer field, tennis courts, and a survival game field. It takes approximately one hour to walk the trails around the lake. There are additional trails that wind through the mountains that surround the lake. One such trail leads to 3 miniature places of worship, including the 1.8-meter tall "An min temple", the 1.8 m tall "Lake Church", and the 1.5 m tall replica of St. Peter's Basilica.

== History ==
The park was built by the Korean Water Corporation in 1964 to supply water to adjacent industry by extending Seonam Pond. Public access was not allowed until 2007 when the lake was remodeled, and renamed Seonam Lake Park.

== See also ==
- List of South Korean tourist attractions
- Ulsan Grand Park
