= Samsan-dong, Ulsan =

Coordinates: 35.544°N 129.342°E

Samsan-dong
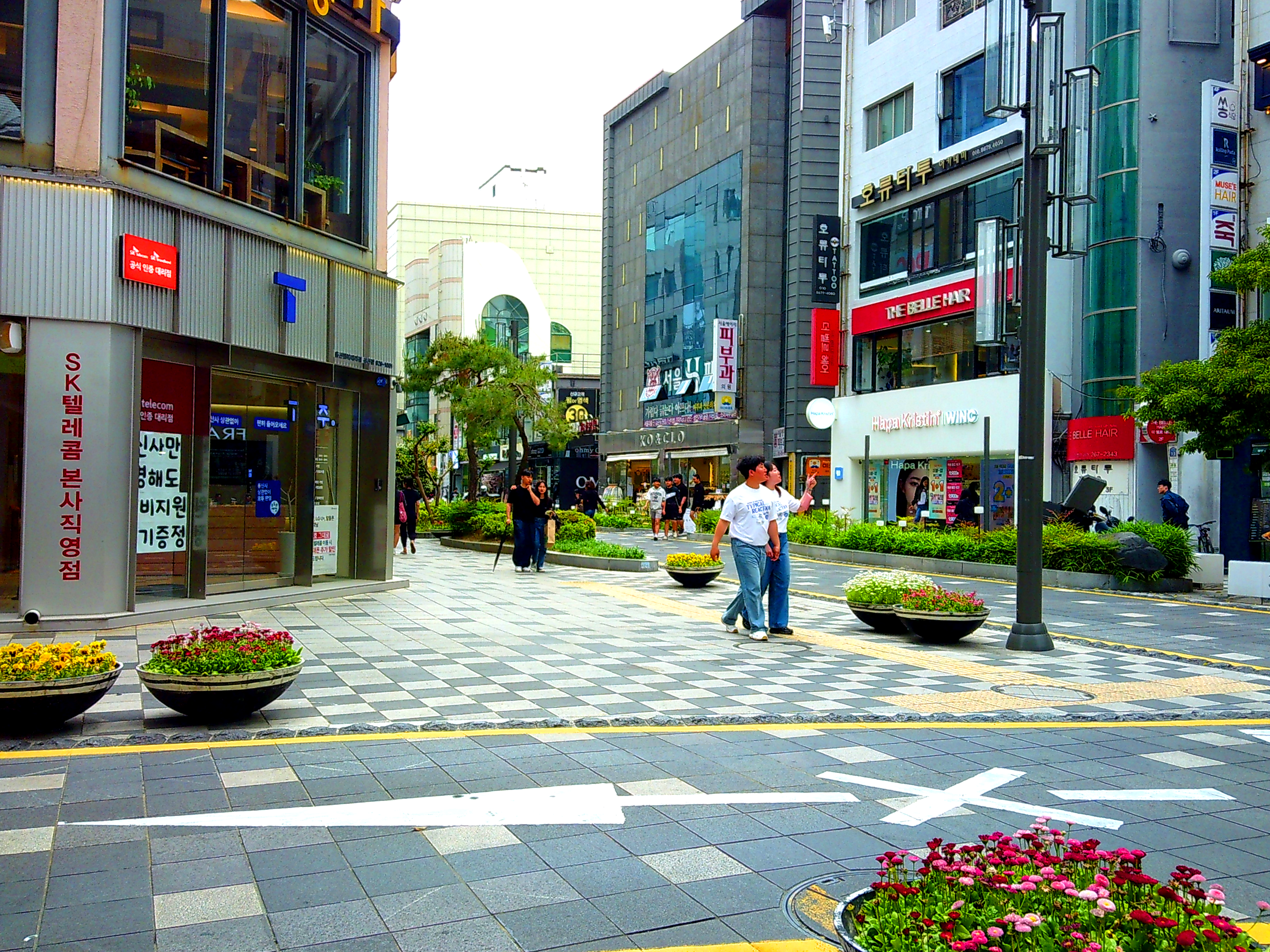
- Interactive map of Samsan-dong
- Country: South Korea
- Region: Ulsan

Area
  - Total: 5.78 km^{2} (2.23 sq mi)

Population
  - Total: 50,542
  - Density: 8,740/km^{2} (22,600/sq mi)

Korean name
- Hangul: 삼산동
- Hanja: 三山洞
- RR: Samsan-dong
- MR: Samsan-dong

Samsan-dong (Korean: 삼산동) is a dong, or neighborhood, of Nam-gu in Ulsan, South Korea. Samsan literally translates as "three mountains". It is Ulsan's downtown area.

== History ==
- 1911 Previously Jungri, Samsan, Shilli, Daehyeon-myeon
- 1914 Renamed to Samsanri-ro, Ulsan-gun
- June 1, 1962 Samsan-dong, Ulsan-si (city promotion in status)
- 1972 Incorporated to Daldong, Ulsan-si
- March 2, 1995 Divided into Samsan-dong, Dal-dong
- July 15, 1997 Samsan-dong, Nam-gu, Ulsan Metropolitan City (promotion in status to metropolitan city)

== Schools ==
Samsan Elementary School
Paekhap Elementary School
Samshin Elementary School
Ulsan Gangnam Middle School
Samsan High School
