= Ulsan Museum =

- 울산 박물관
- Ulsan museum in 2026
- Established: 22 June 2011
- Location: Nam-gu, Ulsan, South Korea
- Coordinates: 35.52724°N 129.30862°E
- Type: History museum
- Parking: On site
- Website: museum.ulsan.go.kr/main/main.jsp

Korean name
- Hangul: 울산 박물관
- Hanja: 蔚山 博物館
- RR: Ulsan bangmulgwan
- MR: Ulsan pangmulgwan

Ulsan Museum (Korean: 울산 박물관) is a history museum located adjacent to Ulsan Grand Park in Nam-gu, Ulsan, South Korea. The museum has a permanent exhibit that details life in Ulsan and the rest of Korea from prehistoric times to the present. Construction of the museum commenced on 2 January 2009 and was completed on 31 January 2011. It opened on 22 June 2011.

== See also ==
- List of museums in South Korea
- List of South Korean tourist attractions
- Jangsaengpo Whale Museum
- Ulsan Science Museum
