= Sinjeong-dong =

Sinjeong-dong may refer to:

- Sinjeong-dong, Mapo District, Seoul
- Sinjeong-dong, Yangcheon District, Seoul
- Sinjeong-dong, Nam District, Ulsan
- Sinjeong-dong, Jeongeup, North Jeolla Province
- Sinjeong-dong, Namwon, North Jeolla Province
- Sinjeong-dong, the former name of Onyang 4-dong, Asan, South Chungcheong Province
