= Samho-dong =

Coordinates: 35.550°N 129.266°E

- Interactive map of Samho-dong
- Country: South Korea
- Region: Ulsan

Area
  - Total: 2.42 km^{2} (0.93 sq mi)

Population (2012)
  - Total: 24,147
  - Density: 9,980/km^{2} (25,800/sq mi)

Korean name
- Hangul: 삼호동
- Hanja: 三呼洞
- RR: Samho-dong
- MR: Samho-dong

Samho-dong (Korean: 삼호동) is a dong, or neighborhood, of Nam-gu in Ulsan, South Korea.
