= Park Joo-hyun =

Park Joo-hyun or Park Ju-hyun (Korean: 박주현) is a Korean name consisting of the family name Park and the given name Joo-hyun. It may refer to:

- Park Ju-hyun (born 1994), South Korean actress
- Park Joo-hyun (footballer) (born 1985), South Korean footballer
- Park Joo-hyun (politician) (born 1963), South Korean politician
