= Ulsan Industrial Center Monument =

울산공업센터 건립 기념탑 蔚山工業Center建立記念塔 Ulsan Industrial Center Monument
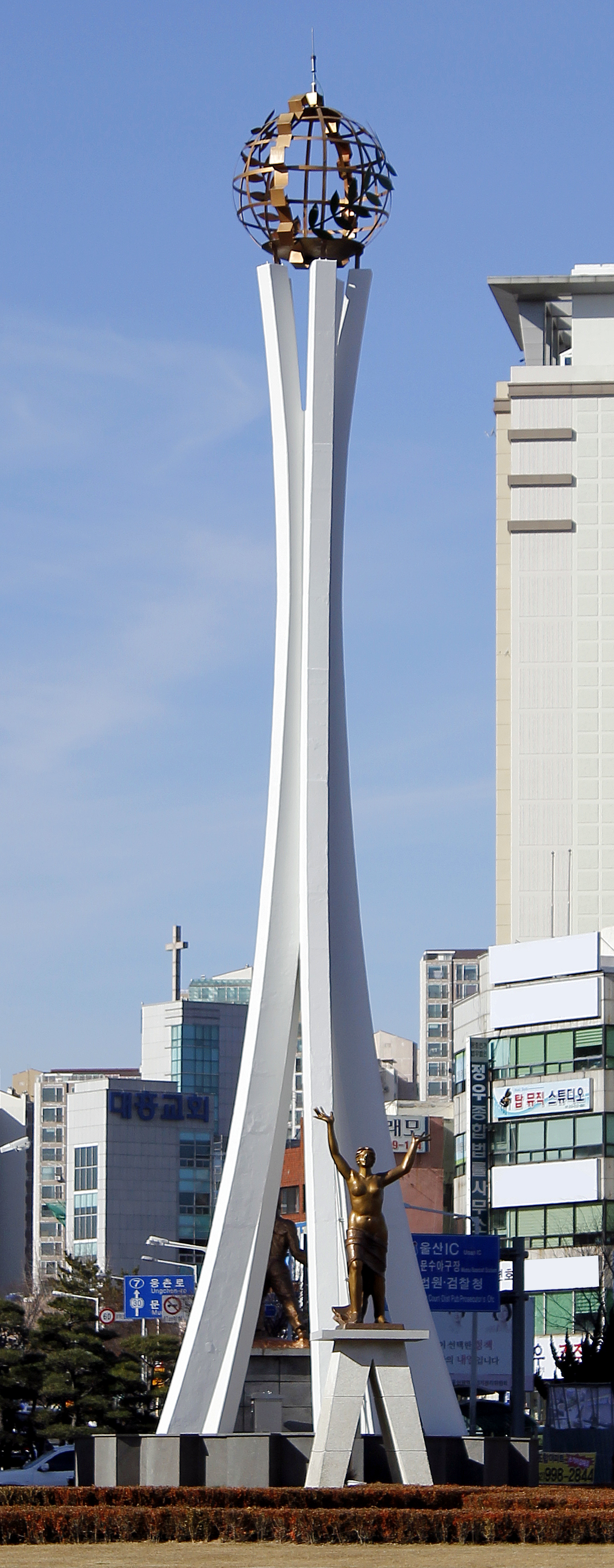
- Gongeoptap, taken from Southeast side

- Location within Ulsan
- Alternative names: 공업탑 (工業塔); Gongeoptap (Industrial Tower, Industry Tower)

General information
- Status: Completed
- Type: Monument, Traffic circle
- Location: Ulsan
- Coordinates: 35°31′56.1″N 129°18′27.1″E
- Construction started: 1962
- Completed: 1967 (Tower); 1974 (Garden)

Ulsan Industrial Center Monument (울산공업센터 건립 기념탑), widely known as Gongeoptap (공업탑, Industrial Tower), is a monumental tower located in Gongeoptap Rotary, Namgu, Ulsan.

== Epigraphy ==
There are 4 epigraphs around the tower: 2 of them are written by dictator and then chairman of Supreme Council for National Reconstruction Park Chung-hee in 1962 and one is written by the monument construct committee in 1967, while the other is written by the city government in 2012.

=== Congratulatory Note On the Groundbreaking Ceremony For Ulsan Industrial Center ===
蔚山工業센타起工式致辭文

四千年貧困의歷史를 씻고 民族宿願의 富貴를마련하기爲하여 우리는이곳蔚山을 찾
아여기에 新工業都市를建設하기로하였읍니다 루르 의奇蹟을超越하고 新羅의榮盛을
再現하려는이民族的 慾求을 이곳蔚山에서實現하려는것이니 이것은民族再興의 터전
을 닦는것이고 國家百年大計의寶庫를 마련하는것이며 子孫萬代의繁榮을約束하는
民族的蹶起인것입니다 第2次産業의 우렁찬建設의 수레소리가 東海를震動하고 工
業生産의 검은煙氣가 大氣속에 뻗어나가는 그날엔國家民族의 希望과發展이 눈앞
에 到來하였음을 알수있는것임니다 貧困에허덕이는 겨레여러분 5.16革命 眞
意는 어떤政權에對한 노욕이나 政体의變造에도 그目的이 있었던것은 아니었으며
오로지이겨레로부터 貧困을驅逐하고 子孫萬代를위한永遠한 繁榮과 福祉를 마
련할 經濟再建을成就하여야 되겠다는 숭고한 사명감에서 蹶起했던것입니다 이蔚山
工業都市의 建設이야말로 革命政府의 總力을다 할 象徵的雄圖이며 基成敗는 民族貧富의
판가름이될것이니 온民族은 새로운覺醒과奮發 그리고 協同으로서 이世紀的 課業의
成功的 完遂를爲하여 奮起努力해주시기바라 마지않읍니다.

1962年 2月 3日

國家再建最高會議議長 陸軍大將 朴 正 熙

Congratulatory Note On the Groundbreaking Ceremony For Ulsan Industrial Center

We have gathered here in Ulsan to build a new industrial city through which we aspire to end the 4,000-year history of poverty
in our nation and achieve long-hoped-for national wealth.
We are determined to make our dreams of transcending the miracle of Ruhr and reviving the glory of Silla become reality in Ulsan
based on our firm commitment to establishing the foundation for national rehabilitation,
devising and pursuing long-range national projects, and realizing the promise of prosperity through the generations.
The day when the roaring of the wheels of construction resonates across the nation and the smoke from the chimneys of industrial production sites whirls
through the air is the day our national hope for development has been realized.
My fellow citizens in hardship, The May 16 Revolution was not for any political greed or change in political beliefs
but solely for the lofty mission of ending poverty and achieving economic rehabilitation towards national prosperity and eternal social welfare.
The construction of an industrial city in Ulsan is, in itself, a symbol of the revolutionary government’s determination to do its utmost to achieve this mission.
This government’s success or failure will decide the economic status of the nation, and it is my sincere hope that the Korean people, in this knowledge,
will do their best for the successful completion of this task of the century by channeling patriotism, pursuing aspirations, and embracing cooperation.

— February 3, 1962, Army general, Chung-Hee Park, Chairman of the Supreme Council for National Reconstruction

=== Declaration Of the Designation Of Ulsan Industrial District ===
蔚山工業센타指定宣言文

大韓民國政府는 第一次 經濟開
發五個年計劃을 實踐함에 있어서
綜合製鐵工場 肥料工場 精油工
場및 其他關聯産業을 建設하기爲
하여 慶尙南道蔚山郡의 蔚山邑
方漁津靣 大峴面 下厢靣 靑艮
面의 斗旺里 凡西靣의 無去里
茶雲里및 農所靣의 蕐峰里 松亭
里를 蔚山工業地區로 設定함을
이에宣言한다

1962年2月3日

國家再建最高會議議長
陸軍大將 朴 正 熙

Declaration Of the Designation Of Ulsan Industrial District

The Korean government, to advance with its “First Five-Year Economic Development Plan,”
hereby declares the designation of Ulsan-eup, Bangeojin-eup,
Daehyeon-myeon, and Hasang-myeon in Ulsan-gun;
Cheongnyang-myeon, Dowang-ri, Mugeo-ri and Daun-ri in Beomseo-myeon;
and Hwabong-ri and Songjeong-ri in Nongso-myeon
in Gyeongsangnam-do as the Ulsan Industrial District
in which integrated steelworks, fertilizer plants, oil refineries,
and other related industrial facilities shall be built.

— February 3, 1962, Army general, Chung-Hee Park, Chairman of the Supreme Council for National Reconstruction

=== Note On the Purpose Of Constructing the Monument ===
기념탑건립취지문

아시아 태평양시대로 힘차게 뻗어
나가는 동해바다의 검 푸른 물결
을 바라보면서 조국근대화의 고동
소리도 우렁차게 메아리치는 이고
장울산 공업입국에 앞장선지도
어느듯 여섯해가되었읍니다
한줌의 흙 한그루나무에도 신라
천년의 슬기로운 역사가 담겨져
있는 이터전에 맥을 잡고 삽을
내리니 숙명처럼 되풀이해온 나라
와 겨레의 가난과 슬픔은 새역사
와 더불어 윤택의 기쁨으로 그모
습을 바꾸어 가고 있읍니다
그래서 이 기쁨과 자랑을 길이
기념하고 보다더 알찬 앞날을
다짐하기 위하여 겨레의 승리와
번영을 상징하는 기념탑을 세우고
선언문과 치사문을 수록하여
땀흘려 이룩한 민족중흥의 교훈을
기리 후세에 전하고저 합니다

1967. 4. 20.

울산공업센타기념탑건립위원회

A Note On the Purpose Of Constructing the Monument

It has already been six years since Ulsan undertook initiatives to reposition Korea, through which the East Sea flows,
as a modern, industrialized nation in the Asia-Pacific region.
Ulsan, a region steeped in the wisdom of Silla with a thousand years of history, is now opening a new chapter in history
by freeing Korea from the chains of sorrow and poverty
so that it may embrace the freedom of joyous prosperity.
We are here to commemorate this joy and pride as well as the promise of a better future
through the erection of this tower—
which will stand both as a symbol of national victory and prosperity,
and as a historical record of national restoration for future generations.

— April 20, 1967, Committee for the Erection of the Ulsan Industrial Center Commemorative Tower

=== Second Declaration For the Leap Of Ulsan ===
울산도약 제2선언문
- 새로운 백년, 영광을 위하여 -

울산은 겨레의 아침을 연 영광의 터전이다.

웅혼한 백두대간이 동해를 만나 가지산과 신불산으로 솟았고, 풍요로운 대지는 영원한 축복이었다.
그 너른 품을 적신 태화강은 반구대문화를 낳아 천년 신라를 꽃피웠고, 대대로 풍요와 기회가
넘치는 겨레의 곳간이 되었다.
한 때 우리나라는 근대화에 뒤져 빈곤의 나락에 처하기도 했으나,
1962년, 울산은 불굴의 기상으로 산업의 불꽃을 지피며 민족중흥의 초석을 다졌다.

그로부터 반세기!
울산은 눈부신 성장을 거듭하면서 조국 근대화의 메카역을 다해 왔고, 이제 한국경제의 중심에
우뚝 섬으로써 산업수도로서의 위상을 확고히 했으며, 세계에서 가장 가난했던 이 나라를 세계 10위권의
경제대국으로 견인하였다.
오늘, 역사적인 울산공업센터 지정 50주년을 맞아 울산이 국부의 원천임을 자부하며, 울산의
무궁한 번영을 위해, 통일 조국의 새로운 100년 영광을 위해 다시 한 번 힘찬 도약을 다짐한다.

사람과 자연을 근본으로 삼아, 노동의 가치를 존중하고 기업가 정신을 고양하여 울산을 세계에 우뚝한
친환경 산업수도로 만든다.
자율과 창의로 문화와 예술을 꽃피우고, 모든 시민이 더 많은 기회를 가지는 정의로운 문화 복지
도시로 만든다.

이를 115만 울산광역시민의 이름으로 천명하며 우리의 지표로 삼는다.

2012. 1. 27.

울산광역시

The Second Declaration For the Leap Of Ulsan
- For New Centennial, For the New Glory -

— January 27, 2012, Ulsan Metropolitan City

== Gongeoptap Rotary ==
Gongeoptap Rotary (공업탑 로터리, Industrial Tower Rotary Intersection) is a traffic circle that the monument is located. Like the monument's number of pillars, it contains 5 exits (from North and counterclockwise Bongwol-ro, Munsu-ro, Duwang-ro, Suam-ro, Samsan-ro) and is egg-like asymmetric because of this. As it is the most 'rushing' intersection in Ulsan, the rotary has been functioning as de facto bus transfer center, which is in fact not available in the city yet.

=== List of bus stops named after Gongeoptap ===
There are 4 city bus stops and 2 intercity bus stops which use 'Gongeoptap' name around the rotary, listed in Bus Information System. The stops are:

- Samsan-ro
  - 공업탑 (BIS No. 40401, Google Maps) - East bound, incorrectly informed as 'route to Taehwagang station' but actually buses do not go straight through.
  - 공업탑 (BIS No. 40403, Google Maps) - East bound, no description but the actual bus stop for buses route to Taehwagang station.
  - 공업탑 (BIS No. 40402, Google Maps) - West bound, informed as 'route to Gongeoptop' and in reality buses turn the rotary.
  - 공업탑 (BIS No. 40404, Google Maps) - West bound, no description but for buses that go directly Bongwol-ro or Munsu-ro.
  - 공업탑 (Google Maps): East bound, intercity/Express unload only.
- Munsu-ro
  - 공업탑 시외정류소 (Google Maps): West bound, intercity load only; there was a city bus stop with the same name and location but removed in 2015.
