= Mugeo-dong =

Coordinates: 35.546°N 129.263°E

- Interactive map of Mugeo-dong
- Country: South Korea
- Region: Ulsan

Area
  - Total: 3.48 km^{2} (1.34 sq mi)

Population (2012)
  - Total: 38,225
  - Density: 11,000/km^{2} (28,400/sq mi)

Korean name
- Hangul: 무거동
- Hanja: 無去洞
- RR: Mugeo-dong
- MR: Mugŏ-dong

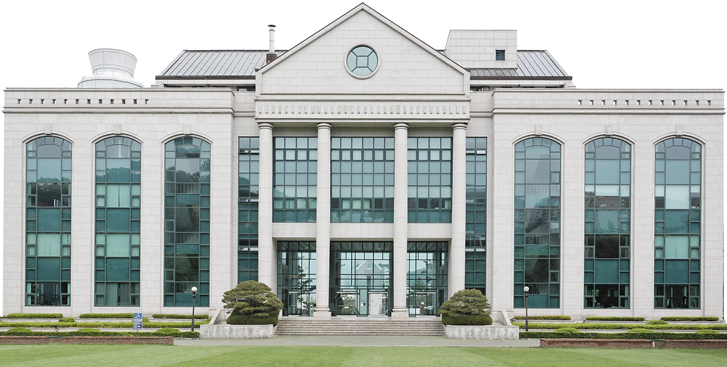
The University of Ulsan in Mugeo-dong

Mugeo-dong (Korean: 무거동) is a dong, or neighborhood, of Nam-gu in Ulsan, South Korea.

== Geography ==
The eastern part of Mugeo-dong borders Ok-dong, to the west it borders Beomseo-eup and Cheongnyang-eup, and to the north it borders Daun-dong and Taehwa-dong in Jung-gu.
