= Jun Won-tchack =

South Korean lawyer, writer and broadcaster

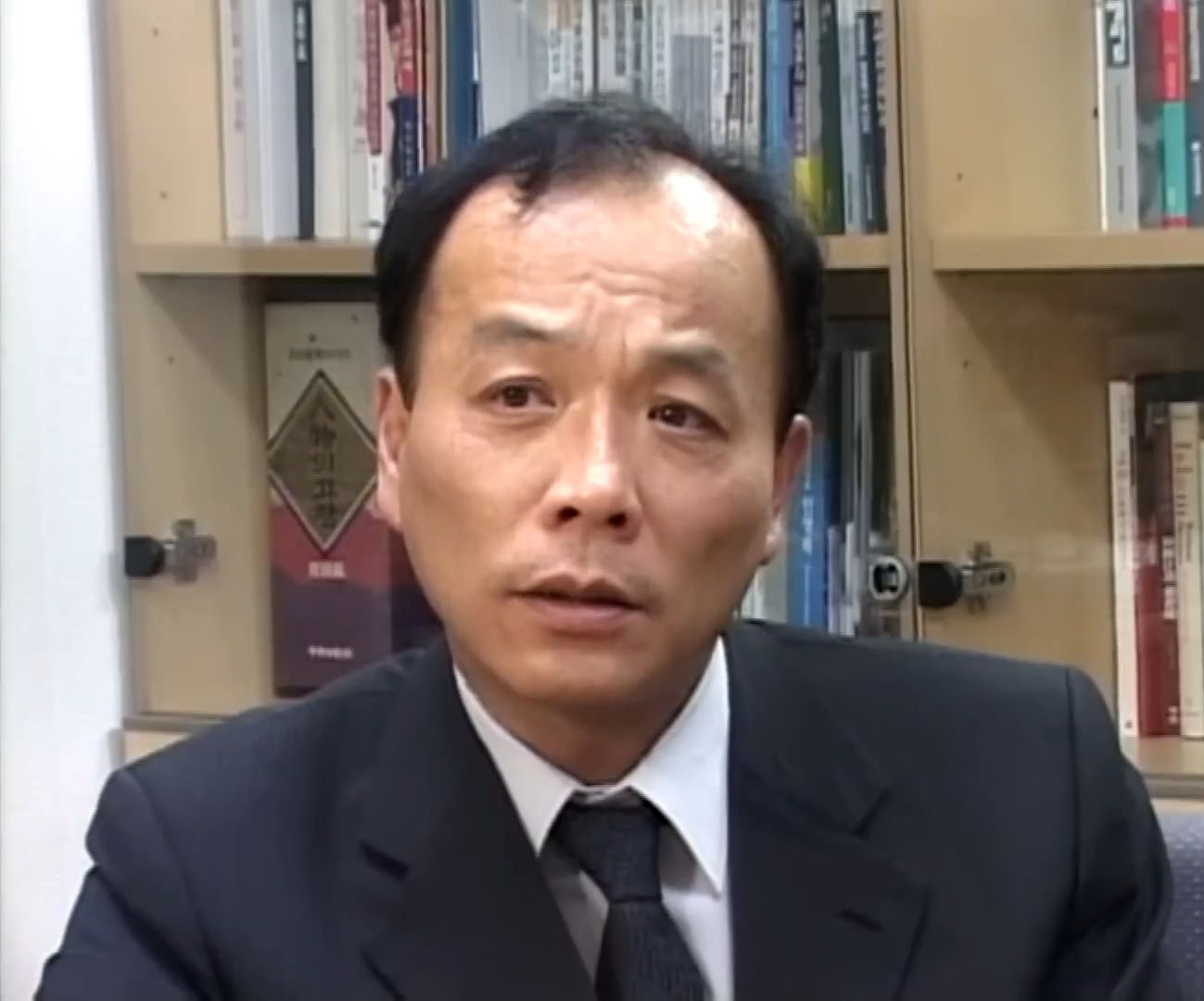
- Born: January 8, 1955 (age 71); Ulsan, South Korea
- Other names: Jeon Geo-seong (전거성)
- Education: Kyung Hee University, college of law
- Occupations: Lawyer; writer; broadcaster
- Spouse: Gim Seong-eun (김성은)
- Parent(s): Jeon Seong-hak (전성학), Gim Tae-seon (김태선)

Korean name
- Hangul: 전원책
- Hanja: 全元策
- RR: Jeon Wonchaek
- MR: Chŏn Wŏnch'aek
- Website: www.junwontchack.com

Jun Won-tchack (Korean: 전원책; born January 8, 1955) is a South Korean lawyer, writer and broadcaster. He is well known for holding right-wing political views. He was born in Ulsan, South Korea. He served in the military as a lawyer and was discharged as a colonel.

== Education ==
- 1966 Graduated from Daehyun elementary school in Ulsan
- 1969 Graduated from Busan middle school
- 1972 Graduated from Busan high school
- 1979 Graduated from the Kyung Hee University college of law
