= Jung Ju-hyeon =

South Korean baseball player (born 1990)

Jeong Ju-hyeon

LG Twins – No. 7
- Center fielder, Second baseman
- Born: October 13, 1990 (age 35); Ulsan
- Bats: Right Throws: Right

debut
- 2009, for the LG Twins
- Stats at Baseball Reference

Teams
- LG Twins (2009–2013); Sangmu Baseball Team (2014–2018); LG Twins (2019–2023(release)

- Jung Ju-hyeon
- Hangul: 정주현
- Hanja: 鄭周賢
- RR: Jeong Juhyeon
- MR: Chŏng Chuhyŏn

Jeong Ju-hyeon (Korean: 정주현; born October 13, 1990), is a center fielder and second baseman for the LG Twins. He began his career when he was recruited as a left fielder for the LG Twins in 2009 and stayed with the team until 2013 when he joined Sangmu Baseball Team for his military service. He returned from Military Service in 2015 and has been with the LG Twins since.

== Education ==
- Daehyun Elementary School, Ulsan
- Gyeongsang Middle School, Daegu
- Daegu High School, Daegu
