= Jangsaengpo =

Port in Ulsan, South Korea

Coordinates: 34°52′N 128°43′E

Jangsaengpo (Korean: 장생포) is a port located in Nam District, Ulsan, South Korea. It was famous of the hottest whaling place of Korean Peninsula before banning commercial whaling by IWC. Now, Jangsaengpo is a rising tourist attraction with Jangsaengpo whale museum, Whale ecological Experience Hall, and Ulsan whale cruise.

== History ==
The Jangsaengpo whaling originates from the establishment of the Pacific Fisheries Co., Ltd. by the Russian Emperor, Nicholas II in 1891.

However, as Japan monopolized the whaling business after the victory of the Russo-Japanese War and overhauled whaling stations nationwide, Jangsaengpo drew attention as the center of the whaling business. After liberation, Korean people jointly took over the Japanese-run company and changed its name to Joseon Whaling Co., Ltd. This was the start of the history of Korean whaling. In the late 1970s when the whaling was at its zenith, Jangsaengpo held 20 whaling ships, with 10,000 residents.

However, careless whaling reduced the catch and some species were even in danger of extinction by 1980. These drawbacks led the International Whaling Commission (IWC) to decide to ban commercial whaling in 1986, and eventually, the whaling industry was stopped. Then, as industrial complexes were created in the vicinity of Jangsaengpo and most of the residents moved away, the decline of Jangsaengpo resulted.

== Tourist attractions ==
- Jangsaengpo Whale Museum & Whale Ecological Experience Hall: As the only whale museum in Korea, Jangsaengpo Whale Museum collects, maintains and displays whaling-related artifacts, which have been disappearing since 1986 when whaling was prohibited. It also provides a variety of information related to whales and marine ecosystems and is a space for education, research and experience.
- Whale Cruise: Encounter whales in their natural environment when you take to the seas along a whale migration route. Since dolphins also migrate in groups, a chance of watching them could add to the unforgettable experience. The possibility for seeing whales is highest between June and August. Whale cruise reservations are available via internet only.
