= Joo-hyun =

- Hangul: 주현
- RR: Juhyeon
- MR: Chuhyŏn

Joo-hyun (Korean: 주현), also spelled Joo-hyeon or Ju-hyun, is a Korean given name.

== People ==
People with this name include:

=== Entertainers ===
- Roh Joo-hyun (born Noh Un-young, 1946), South Korean actor
- Ock Joo-hyun (born 1980), South Korean musical theatre actress and singer, member of girl group Fin.K.L
- Kim Joo-hyun (actress) (born 1987), South Korean actress
- Seohyun (born Seo Joo-hyun, 1991), South Korean singer, member of girl group Girls' Generation
- Irene (singer) (born Bae Joo-hyun, 1991), South Korean singer, member of girl group Red Velvet

=== Sportspeople ===
- Oh Ju-hyun (born 1987), South Korean football player
- Jung Ju-hyeon (born 1990), South Korean baseball player
- Lee Joo-hyun (born 1974), South Korean-born American badminton player

== See also ==
- List of Korean given names
