= Suam-dong, Ulsan =

Coordinates: 35.524°N 129.318°E

Suam-dong
- Interactive map of Suam-dong
- Country: South Korea
- Region: Ulsan

Area
  - Total: 0.52 km^{2} (0.20 sq mi)

Population (2012)
  - Total: 18,322
  - Density: 35,000/km^{2} (91,000/sq mi)

Korean name
- Hangul: 수암동
- Hanja: 秀岩洞
- RR: Suam-dong
- MR: Suam-dong

Suam-dong (Korean: 수암동) is a dong, or neighborhood, of Nam-gu in Ulsan, South Korea.

Originally Yaeum 3-dong, the neighborhood was renamed in 2007.
