= Seonam-dong =

Coordinates: 35.513°N 129.335°E

- Interactive map of Seonam-dong
- Country: South Korea
- Region: Ulsan

Area
  - Total: 26.62 km^{2} (10.28 sq mi)

Population (2012)
  - Total: 17,264
  - Density: 648.5/km^{2} (1,680/sq mi)

Korean name
- Hangul: 선암동
- Hanja: 仙岩洞
- RR: Seonam-dong
- MR: Sŏnam-dong

Seonam-dong (Korean: 선암동) is a dong, or neighborhood, of Nam-gu in Ulsan, South Korea.
