= Dong District, Ulsan =

Coordinates: 35°30′N 129°25′E

Dong
- Autonomous District
- View of the Ilsan Beach in Dong District

- Flag

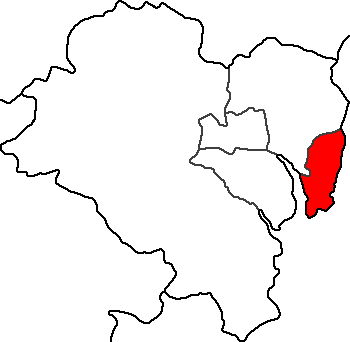
- Country: South Korea
- Region: Yeongnam
- Provincial level: Ulsan

Government
  - Mayor: Cheon Ki-ok (천기옥)

Area
  - Total: 36 km^{2} (14 sq mi)

Population (2024)
  - Total: 151,067
  - Density: 4,200/km^{2} (11,000/sq mi)
  - Dialect: Gyeongsang
- Website: Dong District Office

Korean name
- Hangul: 동구
- Hanja: 東區
- RR: Dong-gu
- MR: Tong-gu

Dong District (Korean: 동구; lit. 'East District') is a gu, or district, in central Ulsan, South Korea.

== Administrative divisions ==
Dong district is further divided into these neighborhoods:

- Bangeo-dong (방어동)
- Daesong-dong (대송동)
- Hwajeong-dong (화정동)
- Ilsan-dong (일산동)
- Jeonha 1-dong (전하1동)
- Jeonha 2-dong (전하2동)
- Nammok 1-dong (남목1동)
- Nammok 2-dong (남목2동)
- Nammok 3-dong (남목3동)

== Economy ==
Key subsidiaries of the Hyundai Group, HD Hyundai Heavy Industries and HD Hyundai Mipo Dockyard, are located in Dong District.

However, since the mid-2010s, the shipbuilding industry has faced a severe downturn, leading to the spin-off of some divisions of Hyundai Heavy Industries and the relocation of certain facilities to other regions. This has resulted in a population decline and a slight drop in average income. Nevertheless, the area still ranks within the top 20 nationwide in terms of economic standing. Starting in the 2020s, the recovery of the shipbuilding industry has shown signs of revival, with rising real estate prices signaling a potential rebound.

== Education ==
=== University ===
- Ulsan College (East Campus)

=== High School ===
- Hyundai High School
- Bangeojin High School
- Hyundai Technical High School
- Hyundai Chungun High School

== Tourism ==
- Ilsan Beach, A beach located in Ilsan-dong, Dong District, Ulsan Metropolitan City, along the East Coast.
- Daewangam Park, A park located at 100 Deungdae-ro, Ilsan-dong, Dong District, Ulsan Metropolitan City.This is said to be the place where Queen Jaui, the wife of King Munmu, was buried beneath the rocky islet, vowing to become a dragon to protect the nation even after her death.

== See also ==
List of districts in South Korea
