= Yaeum-Jangsaengpo-dong =

Neighborhood in Ulsan, South Korea

Coordinates: 35.519°N 129.363°E

- Interactive map of Yaeum-Jangsaengpo-dong
- Country: South Korea
- Region: Ulsan

Area
  - Total: 13.20 km^{2} (5.10 sq mi)

Population (2012)
  - Total: 13,959
  - Density: 1,057/km^{2} (2,739/sq mi)

Korean name
- Hangul: 야음장생포동
- Hanja: 也音長生浦洞
- RR: Yaeumjangsaengpo-dong
- MR: Yaŭmjangsaengp'o-dong

Yaeum-Jangsaengpo-dong (Korean: 야음장생포동) is a dong, or neighborhood, of Nam-gu in Ulsan, South Korea.

Originally Yaeum 1-Jangsaengpo-dong, the neighborhood was renamed in 2007.

== See also ==
- Yaeum market
