= Sinjeong-dong, Ulsan =

Coordinates: 35.541°N 129.307°E

- Hangul: 신정동
- Hanja: 新停洞
- RR: Sinjeong-dong
- MR: Sinjŏng-dong

Sinjeong-1-dong
- Interactive map of Sinjeong-1-dong
- Country: South Korea
- Region: Ulsan

Area
  - Total: 1.80 km^{2} (0.69 sq mi)

Population (2012)
  - Total: 19,896
  - Density: 11,100/km^{2} (28,600/sq mi)

Sinjeong-2-dong
- Interactive map of Sinjeong-2-dong

Area
  - Total: 2.67 km^{2} (1.03 sq mi)

Population (2012)
  - Total: 22,609
  - Density: 8,470/km^{2} (21,900/sq mi)
- Website: Sinjeong-2-dong community center (in Korean)

Sinjeong-3-dong
- Interactive map of Sinjeong-3-dong

Area
  - Total: 1.12 km^{2} (0.43 sq mi)

Population (2012)
  - Total: 13,109
  - Density: 11,700/km^{2} (30,300/sq mi)
- Website: Sinjeong-3-dong community center (in Korean)

Sinjeong-4-dong
- Interactive map of Sinjeong-4-dong

Area
  - Total: 0.81 km^{2} (0.31 sq mi)

Population (2012)
  - Total: 25,758
  - Density: 32,000/km^{2} (82,000/sq mi)
- Website: Sinjeong-4-dong community center (in Korean)

Sinjeong-5-dong
- Interactive map of Sinjeong-5-dong

Area
  - Total: 0.60 km^{2} (0.23 sq mi)

Population (2012)
  - Total: 8,987
  - Density: 15,000/km^{2} (39,000/sq mi)
- Website: Sinjeong-5-dong community center (in Korean)

Sinjeong-dong (Korean: 신정동) is a dong, or neighborhood, of Nam-gu in Ulsan, South Korea. Sinjeong-dong is further divided into five subdivisions: Sinjeong-1-dong, Sinjeong-2-dong, Sinjeong-3-dong, Sinjeong-4-dong, and Sinjeong-5-dong.
