= Daehyeon-dong, Ulsan =

Coordinates: 35.53°N 129.33°E

Daehyeon-dong
- Interactive map of Daehyeon-dong
- Country: South Korea
- Region: Ulsan

Area
  - Total: 1.08 km^{2} (0.42 sq mi)

Population 2012
  - Total: 31,552
  - Density: 29,200/km^{2} (75,700/sq mi)

Korean name
- Hangul: 대현동
- Hanja: 大峴洞
- RR: Daehyeon-dong
- MR: Taehyŏn-dong

Daehyeon-dong (Korean: 대현동) is a dong (neighborhood) of Nam District, Ulsan, South Korea.

Originally Yaeum 2-dong, the neighborhood was renamed in 2007.

== Education ==
The following schools are located in Daehyeon-dong:

=== Elementary schools ===
- Daehyun elementary school (대현초학교)
- Dosan elementary school (도산초등학교)
- Ulsan Nambu elementary school (울산남부초등학교)
- Ya-eum elementary school (야음초등학교)
- Yeocheon elementary school (여천초등학교)
- Yong-yeon elementary school (용연초등학교)

=== Middle schools ===
- Taehwa middle school (태화중학교)
- Ya-eum middle school (야음중학교)

=== High schools ===
- Daehyeon high school (대현고등학교)
- Sinseon girls' high school (신선여자고등학교)
