= Dal-dong =

Coordinates: 35.537°N 129.326°E

- Interactive map of Dal-dong
- Country: South Korea
- Region: Ulsan

Area
  - Total: 1.22 km^{2} (0.47 sq mi)

Population (2012)
  - Total: 30,666
  - Density: 25,100/km^{2} (65,100/sq mi)

Korean name
- Hangul: 달동
- Hanja: 達洞
- RR: Dal-dong
- MR: Tal-tong

Dal-dong (Korean: 달동) is a dong, or neighborhood, of Nam District, Ulsan, South Korea.
