= Ulsan Grand Park =

Urban park in Ulsan, South Korea

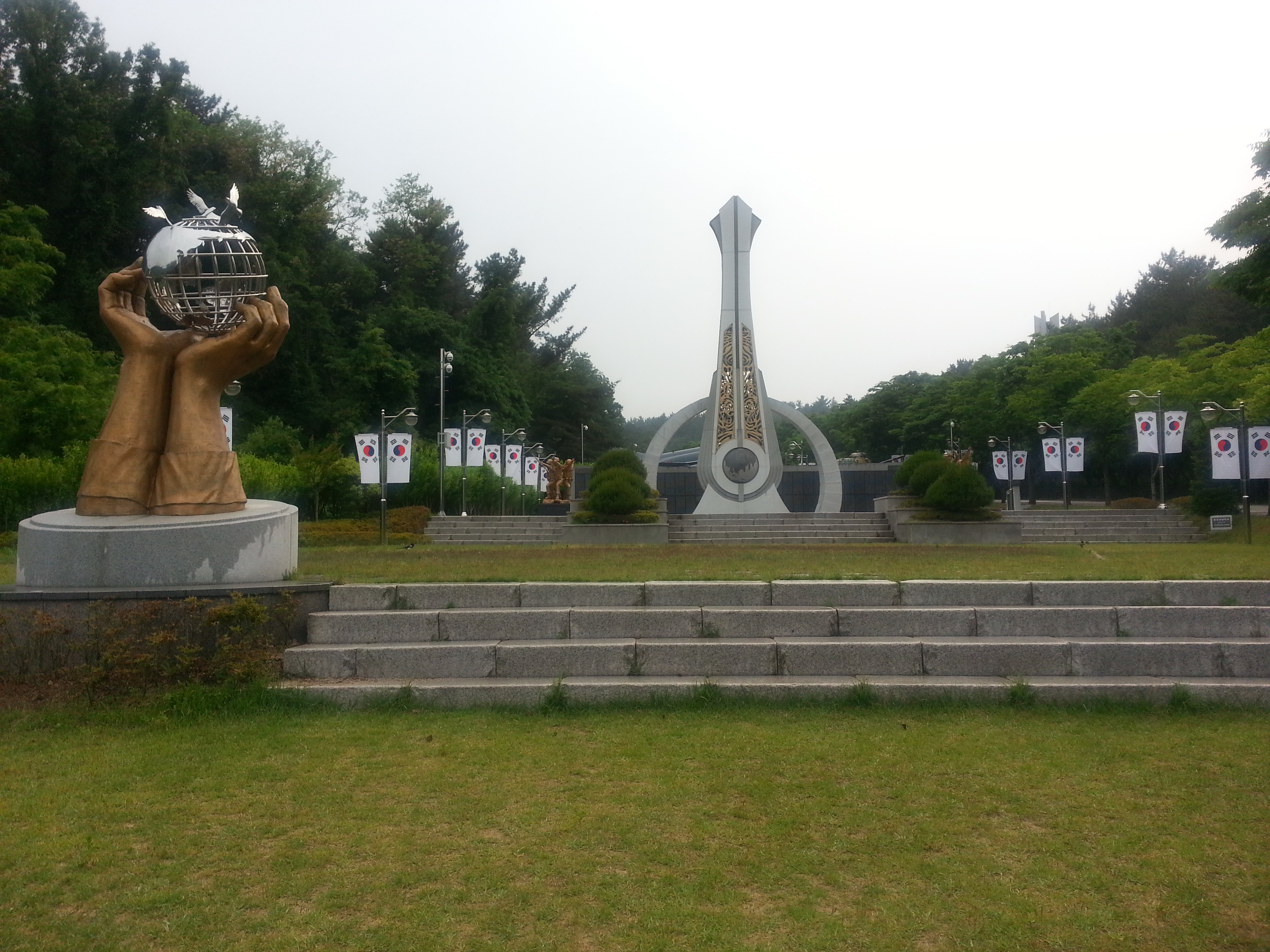
- Interactive map of Ulsan Grand Park
- Type: Urban park
- Location: Nam-gu, Ulsan, South Korea
- Coordinates: 35.528°N 129.299°E
- Area: 3.69 km^{2} (912 acres)
- Created: 2006
- Website: ulsanpark.com

Korean name
- Hangul: 울산대공원
- Hanja: 蔚山大公園
- RR: Ulsan daegongwon
- MR: Ulsan taegongwŏn

Ulsan Grand Park is the largest urban park in South Korea, with 3.69 square kilometres (1.42 square miles) of park land. It is located in Ulsan Metropolitan City, and includes walking trails, a nature learning center, a botanical garden, a petting zoo, a butterfly zoo, and several playgrounds.

== History ==
Chey Tae-won, a former chairman of SK Group, began a money-saving program in 1995 to build a park in the city as a way of giving back to society. Construction began that year and finished in 2006. The total cost of the park was KRW102 billion (equivalent to approximately US$107 million in 2006), with SK paying about 60% of the money and the remaining 40% paid by the city.

== See also ==
- List of South Korean tourist attractions
- Seonam Lake Park
- Ulsan Museum – Located adjacent to the park
