= Jangsaengpo Whale Museum =

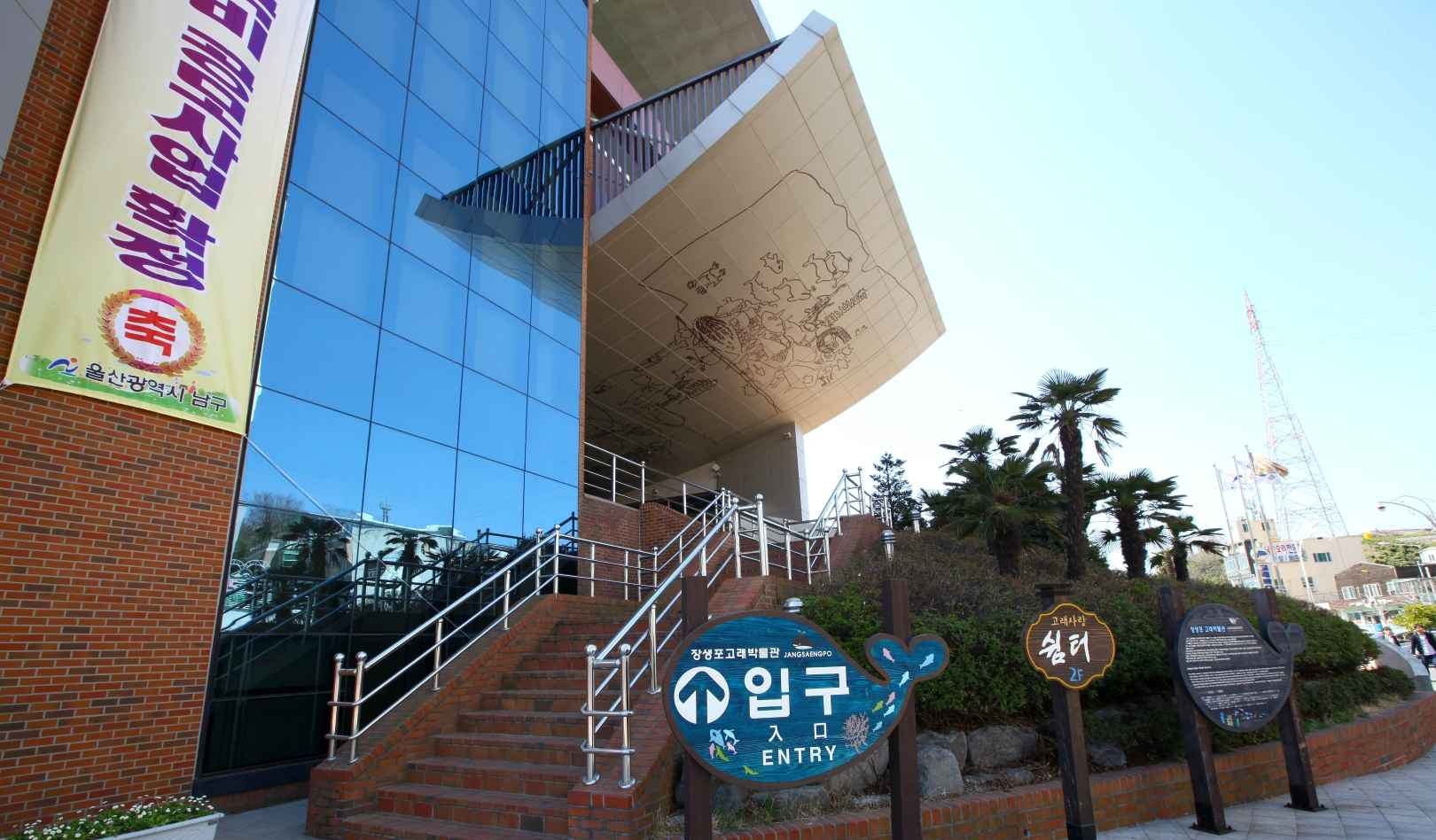
- Established: 31 May 2005
- Location: Nam District, Ulsan, South Korea
- Coordinates: 35.50277°N 129.38080°E
- Type: History museum
- Parking: On site, free
- Website: whalemuseum.go.kr

Korean name
- Hangul: 장생포 고래 박물관
- Hanja: 長生浦 고래 博物館
- RR: Jangsaengpo gorae bangmulgwan
- MR: Changsaengp'o korae pangmulgwan

Jangsaengpo Whale Museum (Korean: 장생포 고래 박물관) is a history museum located in Jangsaengpo, Nam District, Ulsan, South Korea. Opened in 2005, it is dedicated to the history of whaling in Ulsan.

== Background ==
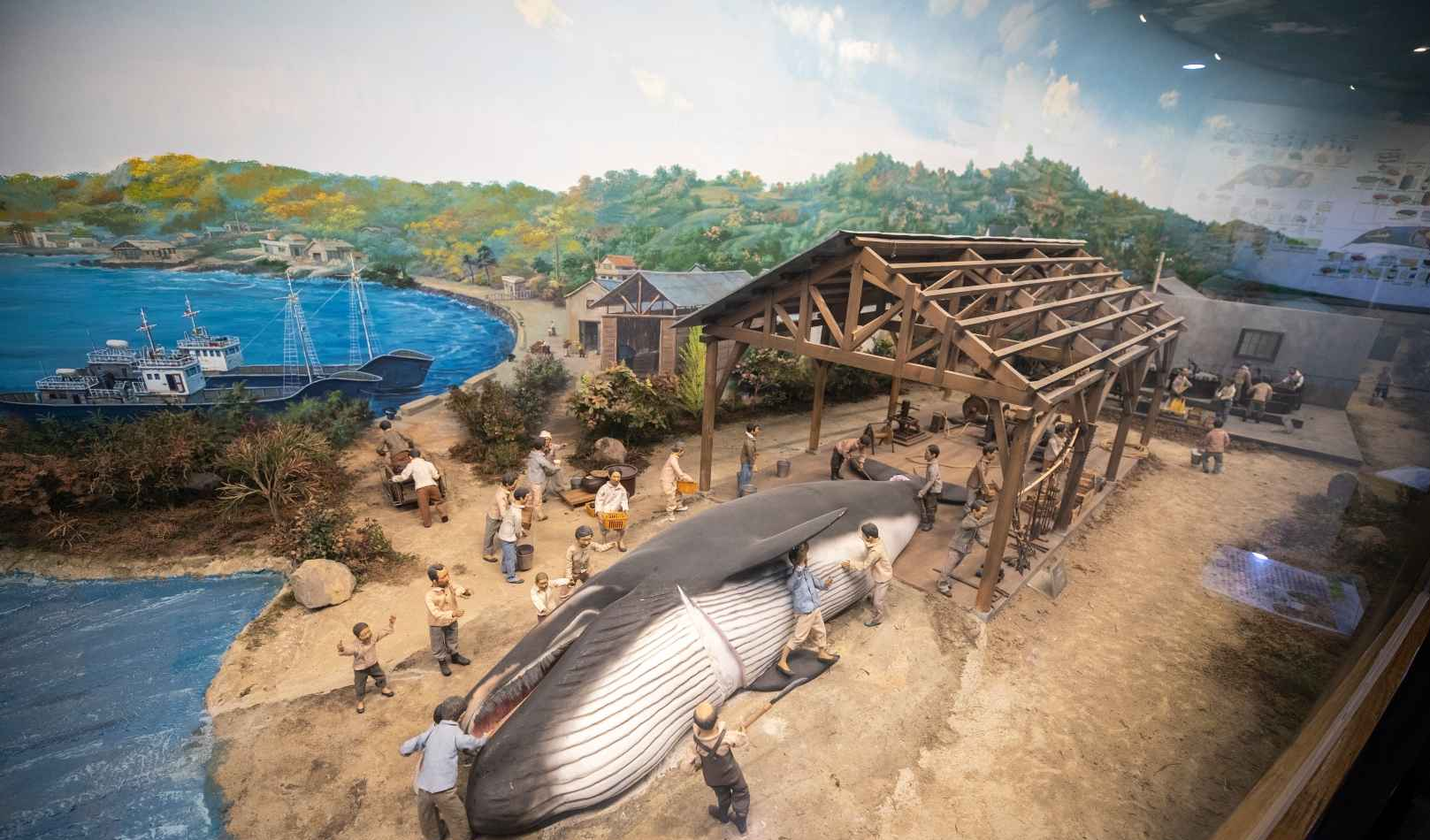

Jangsengpo Whale Museum is the only whale museum in South Korea. The museum details Ulsan's history of whaling. Whaling was banned in South Korea in 1986, but whaling artifacts were kept and are now on display in the museum which is built in what was once a central whaling area.

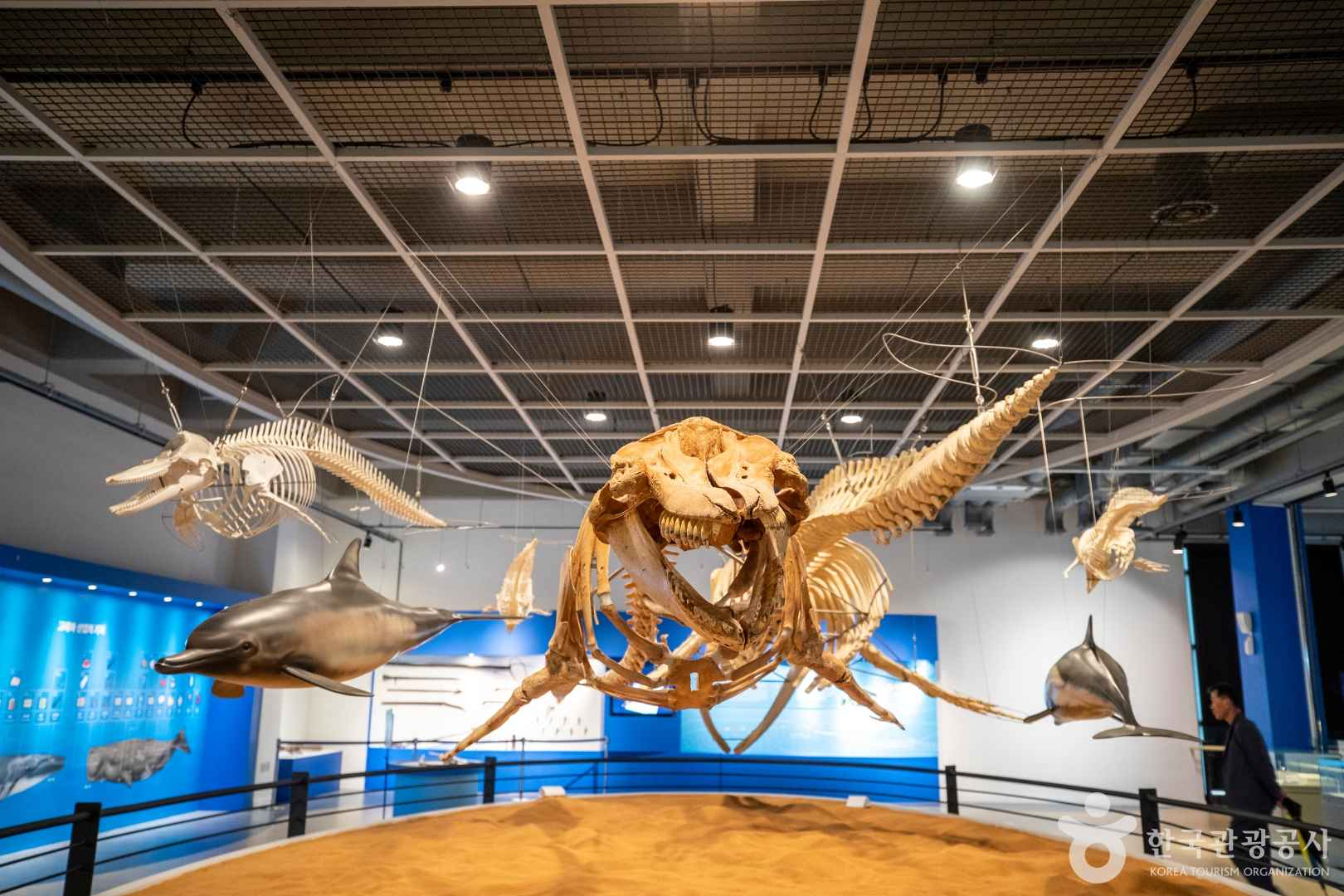

The museum has 6,946 square metres (74,770 square feet) of floor space over three floors, and holds a collection of over 1800 pieces. There is a sculpture of a whale on the museum's roof. The museum provides resources to teach about marine ecology and the importance of conservation in order to protect whale habitats. Collections include several whale skeletons (Bryde's whale, orca, toothed whale) a whaling boat, a 4D theatre, a hall dedicated to the history of whaling, and a hall dedicated to Gray whales, known in Korea as "Ghost whales".

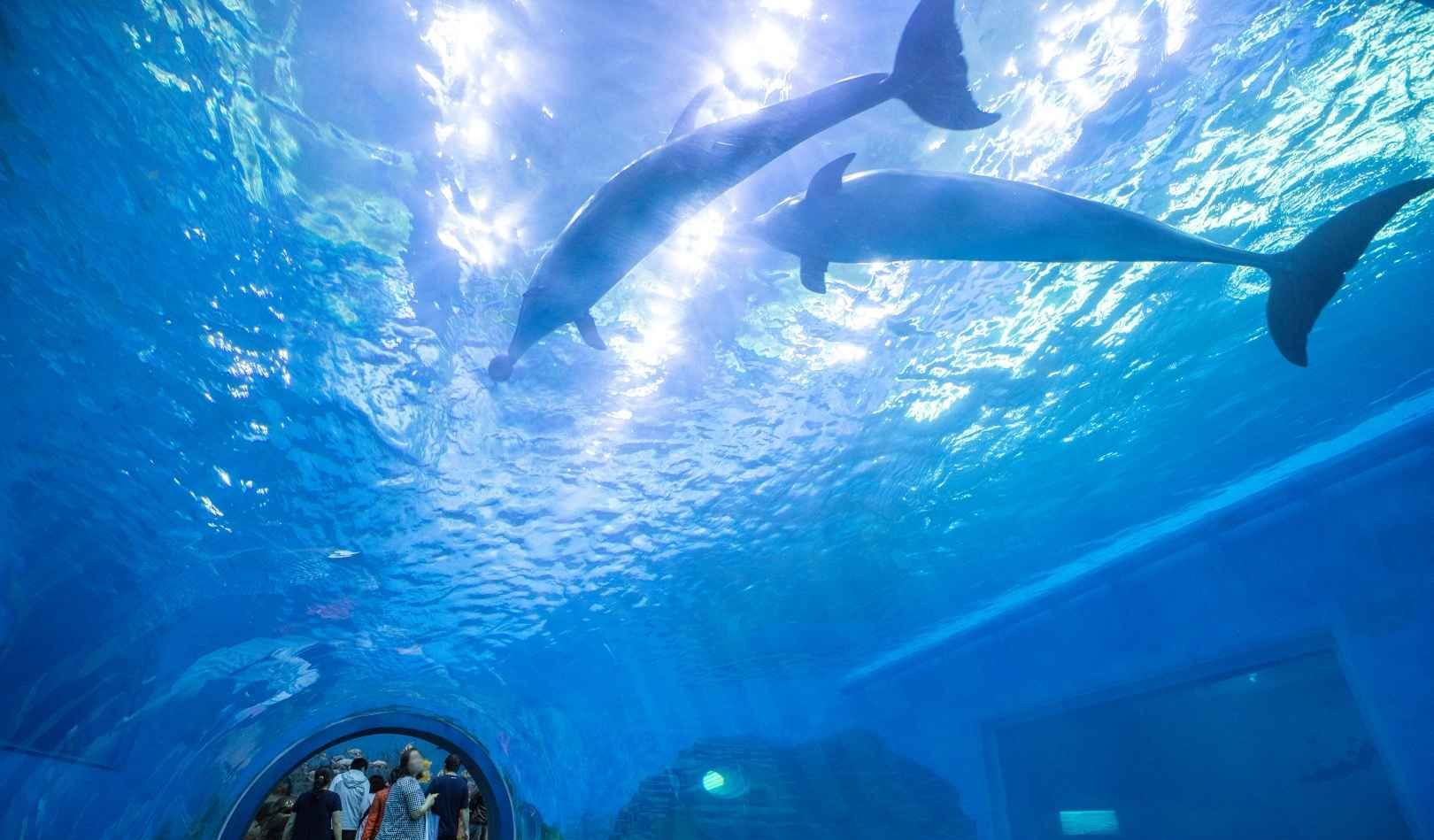

In addition to this, the museum includes the first dolphinarium in Korea, which was opened in the adjacent Whale Ecology Centre on 24 November 2009, where visitors can watch dolphin acrobatic performances. There is a tunnel running underneath the dolphin pool, allowing visitors to view the dolphin activity from underwater.

There is a monorail, around 3–5 metres above ground, allowing users to travel around the Jangsengpo Whale Cultural Village which has a station at the museum.

== See also ==
- List of museums in South Korea
- List of South Korean tourist attractions
- Ulsan Museum
- Ulsan Science Museum
