= Ok-dong =

Coordinates: 35.535°N 129.294°E

- Interactive map of Ok-dong
- Country: South Korea
- Region: Ulsan

Area
  - Total: 11.23 km^{2} (4.34 sq mi)

Population (2012)
  - Total: 29,320
  - Density: 2,611/km^{2} (6,762/sq mi)

Korean name
- Hangul: 옥동
- Hanja: 玉洞
- RR: Ok-dong
- MR: Ok-tong

Ok-dong (Korean: 옥동) is a dong, or neighborhood, of Nam-gu in Ulsan, South Korea.
