= Nam District, Ulsan =

Coordinates: 35.54°N 129.33°E

- Autonomous District
- Flag Logo

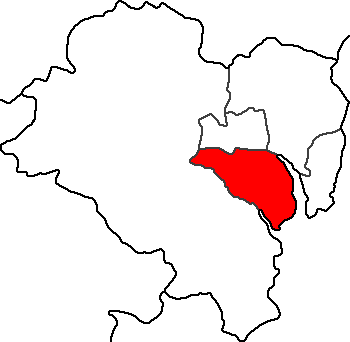
- Location in Ulsan
- Country: South Korea
- Region: Yeongnam
- Provincial level: Ulsan
- Administrative divisions: 14 administrative dong

Area
  - Total: 72.06 km^{2} (27.82 sq mi)

Population (2023)
  - Total: 314,301
  - Density: 4,362/km^{2} (11,300/sq mi)
  - Dialect: Gyeongsang
- Website: Nam District Office (in Korean)

Korean name
- Hangul: 남구
- Hanja: 南區
- RR: Nam-gu
- MR: Nam-gu

Nam District (Korean: 남구; lit. 'South District') is a district of Ulsan, South Korea. Its name means "South District". As of 2023, the district's population was 314,301.

== History ==
Nam District was established on July 15, 1985. On January 1, 1995, the district was consolidated after Ulsan City and Ulsan County merged. On July 15, 1997, Ulsan was elevated to metropolitan status.

== Administrative divisions ==
Nam District is further divided into the following dong (neighbourhoods):

- Daehyeon-dong
- Dal-dong
- Mugeo-dong
- Ok-dong
- Samho-dong
- Samsan-dong
- Seonam-dong
- Sinjeong 1-dong
- Sinjeong 2-dong
- Sinjeong 3-dong
- Sinjeong 4-dong
- Sinjeong 5-dong
- Suam-dong
- Yaeum-Jangsaengpo-dong

== Symbols ==
Nam District's symbols include the camellia, depicting harmony between the four seasons and symbolizing the vibrance and enthusiasm of the district's residents; the dove, representing peace and prosperity and symbolizing the residents' desire to work together to build a better community; and the gingko tree, representing the will to grow and symbolizing the residents' permanent prosperity.

Until 2013, the district's mascot was Tabi, a 7-year-old boy who symbolized the vision of a strong, healthy, and beautiful Nam District. Since 2014, the current mascot is Jangseng-i, a Korean gray whale whose name is taken from the Jangsaengpo Whale Special District.

Tabi, former Nam District mascot

Jangseng-i, the current mascot for Nam District

== Local attractions ==
- Samsan-dong
- Jangsaengpo Whale Museum
- Seonam Lake Park
- Ulsan Culture & Arts Center
- Ulsan Grand Park
- Ulsan Museum
- Ulsan Science Museum
- Ulsan Wholesale Agricultural and Fish Market
- Ulsan Industrial Center Monument

== Education ==
- Ulsan University
- Ulsan College West Campus

== Transport ==
The Ulsan Expressway runs west from Nam District and connects with Eonyang in central Ulju County. The Busan–Ulsan Expressway runs south through Ulju County to Haeundae District.

== Sister cities ==
- Seocho District, Seoul, South Korea
- Liaoyang, China

== See also ==
- List of districts in South Korea
