= Ulsan =

City in South Korea

- Metropolitan City
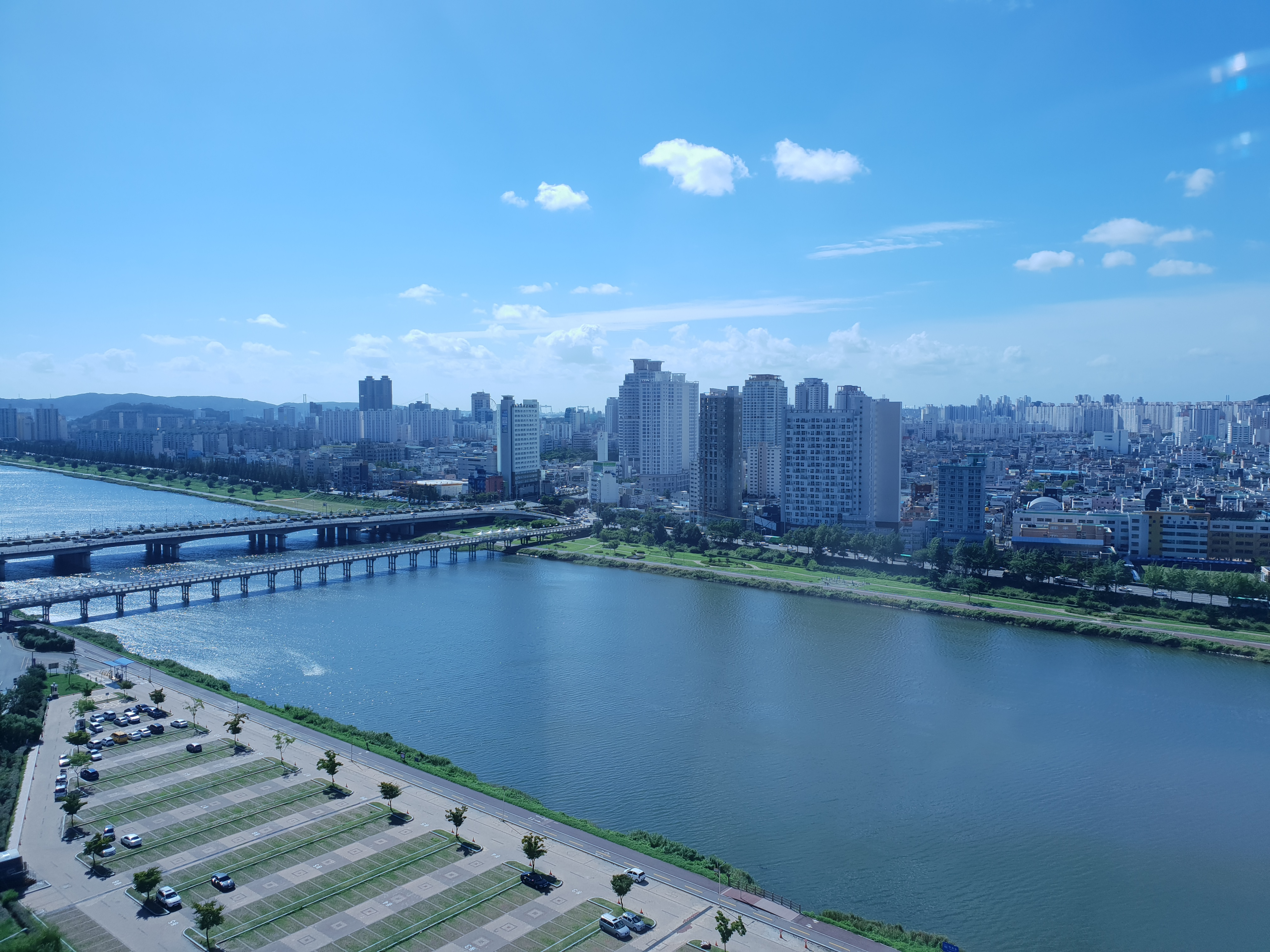
- Taehwa River and skyline

- Flag Logo

- Location within South Korea Location within Asia Location within Earth
- Coordinates: 35°33′N 129°19′E
- Country: South Korea
- Region: Yeongnam
- Districts: 5 (including 1 county)

Government
  - Type: Mayor–Council
  - Mayor: Kim Sang-wook (Democratic)
  - Body: Ulsan Metropolitan Council

Area
  - Total: 1,057.136 km^{2} (408.162 sq mi)

Population (February 2026)
  - Total: 1,098,421
  - Rank: 8th Korea
  - Density: 1,039.054/km^{2} (2,691.137/sq mi)
  - Dialect: Gyeongsang
- Demonym: Ulsanian

GDP (Nominal, 2023)
  - Total: KRW 90 trillion (US$ 72 billion)
  - Per capita: US$ 77,511
- Area code: +82-52(2)
- ISO 3166 code: KR-31
- Website: Official website (English)

Korean name
- Hangul: 울산광역시
- Hanja: 蔚山廣域市
- RR: Ulsan-gwangyeoksi
- MR: Ulsan-gwangyŏksi

Ulsan (Korean: 울산; pronounced [uɭ.s͈an]), officially the Ulsan Metropolitan City, is South Korea's seventh-largest metropolitan city and the eighth-largest city overall, with a population of over 1.1 million inhabitants. It is located in the south-east of the country, neighboring Busan to the south and facing Gyeongju to the north.

Ulsan is the industrial powerhouse of South Korea, forming the heart of the Ulsan Industrial District. It has the world's largest automobile assembly plant, operated by the Hyundai Motor Company; the world's largest shipyard, operated by Hyundai Heavy Industries; and the world's third-largest oil refinery, owned by SK Energy. In 2020, Ulsan had a GDP per capita of $65,352, the highest of any region in South Korea.

Ulsan is the city that built the first automobile hydrogen charging station in the country in 2009. In addition, the first hydrogen ship charging station in the country was installed in Jangsaengpo Port in 2021. Currently, the Ulsan Green Hydrogen Town project, a hydrogen city that supplies hydrogen by connecting the city and a hydrogen power plant, is in progress. In December 2016, 10 Hyundai ix35 FCEVs, the first hydrogen fuel cell taxis in the country, entered test operation.

== Administrative divisions ==
Ulsan is divided into four gu (districts) and one gun (county):

- Buk District (북구; 北區)
- Dong District (동구; 東區)
- Jung District (중구; 中區)
- Nam District (남구; 南區)
- Ulju County (울주군; 蔚州郡)

== History ==
Stone tools found at the Mugeo-dong Ok-hyeon archaeological site indicate that Ulsan was inhabited by humans at least as early as the Paleolithic era. Other findings indicate human inhabitation in the Neolithic Era. Ulsan also contains a substantial number of settlement remains from the Bronze Age. During the Jinhan confederacy, Ulsan was a site of iron mining and production. In the Later Silla period, Ulsan served as an important port for the economic hub of Gyeongju, and likely saw the import of luxury Persian goods such as silver, glass, and peacock tails.

In 1592, the future port-town of Ulsan was the site of a major battle when warrior monks joined citizen soldiers in resisting the Japanese invasion. On January 29, 1598, a combined military operation between Korea and China tried to besiege the castle, but failed as reinforcements from Japan came to delay the fighting. Records from the Joseon period show that Ulsan was developed as a shipbuilding site as early as 1642.

Owing to the two World Wars, Ulsan began to grow as an industrial center. During this time it was part of Keishōnan-dō. In 1962, Ulsan was chosen to become a Special Industrial Zone and in the following year, it formally became a city. The Hyundai Group and SK Group began setting up large businesses in Ulsan. Hyundai Heavy Industries established the shipyard in Ulsan and Hyundai Motor Company started there. Later, SK Energy developed an oil refinery and petrochemical hub there. Ulsan soon transformed into a modern metropolitan city.

On December 31, 1996, legislation on the promotion of Ulsan to a metropolitan city was declared. Ulsan was promoted to a metropolitan city on July 15, 1997.

== Geography, geology, ecology ==
Geographically, Ulsan is located at the southeastern tip of the Korean Peninsula and the southern end of the Taebaek Mountains. The coastline, classified as a mountainous emergent coastline, exhibits relatively simple development and is adjacent to the East Sea. The Taehwa River, which flows through the city into the East Sea, features unique fluvial landforms and has been a central axis for the city's ecological restoration efforts since the early 21st century.

Ulsan is bounded to the south by Busan. Busan is 70 km (43 mi) to the south.

=== Climate ===
Ulsan

Climate chart (precipitation, max. and min. temperature)
J	F	M	A	M	J	J	A	S	O	N	D
39 7 −2	40 10 0	68 14 4	97 19 9	107 24 13	156 26 18	234 29 22	234 30 23	170 26 18	75 22 12	44 16 6	28 10 0
- █ Average max. and min. temperatures in °C
- █ Precipitation totals in mm
Imperial conversion
J	F	M	A	M	J	J	A	S	O	N	D
1.5 45 29	1.6 49 31	2.7 57 38	3.8 67 47	4.2 75 56	6.1 79 64	9.2 85 72	9.2 86 73	6.7 79 65	2.9 71 54	1.7 61 42	1.1 49 32
- █ Average max. and min. temperatures in °F
- █ Precipitation totals in inches

Ulsan has a monsoon-influenced humid subtropical climate (Köppen: Cfa, bordering on Cwa), with cold but dry winters, and hot, humid summers. Monthly means range from 2.0 °C (35.6 °F) in January to 25.9 °C (78.6 °F) in August, with diurnal temperature ranges generally low. Its location on the Korean Peninsula results in a seasonal lag. The warmest days occur in August and average nearly 30 °C (86 °F). Precipitation is relatively low in the winter months, but there is high rainfall from April to September.

Climate data for Ulsan (1991–2020 normals, extremes 1932–present)
Month	Jan	Feb	Mar	Apr	May	Jun	Jul	Aug	Sep	Oct	Nov	Dec	Year
Record high °C (°F)	19.3 (66.7)	24.2 (75.6)	25.4 (77.7)	31.0 (87.8)	34.7 (94.5)	35.5 (95.9)	38.2 (100.8)	38.8 (101.8)	35.6 (96.1)	30.5 (86.9)	27.6 (81.7)	22.4 (72.3)	38.8 (101.8)
Mean daily maximum °C (°F)	7.4 (45.3)	9.6 (49.3)	13.7 (56.7)	19.3 (66.7)	23.7 (74.7)	26.1 (79.0)	29.2 (84.6)	30.0 (86.0)	26.0 (78.8)	21.8 (71.2)	15.9 (60.6)	9.6 (49.3)	19.4 (66.9)
Daily mean °C (°F)	2.4 (36.3)	4.3 (39.7)	8.4 (47.1)	13.7 (56.7)	18.2 (64.8)	21.6 (70.9)	25.2 (77.4)	26.0 (78.8)	21.7 (71.1)	16.5 (61.7)	10.4 (50.7)	4.3 (39.7)	14.4 (57.9)
Mean daily minimum °C (°F)	−1.8 (28.8)	−0.3 (31.5)	3.5 (38.3)	8.5 (47.3)	13.4 (56.1)	17.7 (63.9)	22.1 (71.8)	22.8 (73.0)	18.2 (64.8)	12.1 (53.8)	5.7 (42.3)	−0.1 (31.8)	10.2 (50.4)
Record low °C (°F)	−14.3 (6.3)	−12.5 (9.5)	−9.6 (14.7)	−2.6 (27.3)	3.6 (38.5)	6.8 (44.2)	13.9 (57.0)	13.4 (56.1)	7.9 (46.2)	0.4 (32.7)	−7.8 (18.0)	−12.4 (9.7)	−14.3 (6.3)
Average precipitation mm (inches)	38.6 (1.52)	39.9 (1.57)	68.4 (2.69)	96.9 (3.81)	107.4 (4.23)	155.5 (6.12)	234.1 (9.22)	234.1 (9.22)	170.3 (6.70)	74.8 (2.94)	44.2 (1.74)	28.4 (1.12)	1,292.6 (50.89)
Average precipitation days (≥ 0.1 mm)	5.5	6.0	8.2	8.8	9.3	10.0	13.6	12.7	10.5	5.8	5.9	4.5	100.8
Average snowy days	1.8	2.1	0.9	0.0	0.0	0.0	0.0	0.0	0.0	0.0	0.1	1.2	6.1
Average relative humidity (%)	48.5	50.5	56.1	59.1	64.6	73.5	78.6	77.7	75.8	67.1	60.0	50.9	63.5
Mean monthly sunshine hours	192.8	184.4	200.9	213.1	221.4	171.9	155.7	175.8	159.0	196.4	183.6	194.5	2,249.5
Percentage possible sunshine	61.2	57.4	50.6	52.8	49.5	39.6	34.2	40.0	40.3	55.3	58.8	64.0	49.2
Average ultraviolet index	2	3	3	4	5	5	7	6	5	4	3	2	4
Source 1: Korea Meteorological Administration (percent sunshine 1981–2010)
Source 2: Weather Atlas (UV)

== Demographics ==
Religion in Ulsan (2024)
1. Not religious (48.0%)
2. Buddhism (29.0%)
3. Protestantism (14.0%)
4. Catholicism (7.00%)
5. Others (2.00%)

Historical population
Year	Pop.	±%
1970	157,088	—
1980	418,326	+166.3%
1990	805,355	+92.5%
2000	1,014,428	+26.0%
2010	1,082,567	+6.7%
2020	1,135,423	+4.9%

According to the 2015 census, a majority of Ulsan residents did not belong to any religion. Buddhism was the most common religion with 29.8% of residents being adherents, followed by Protestantism at 10.9% and Roman Catholicism at 4.2%.

== Economy ==
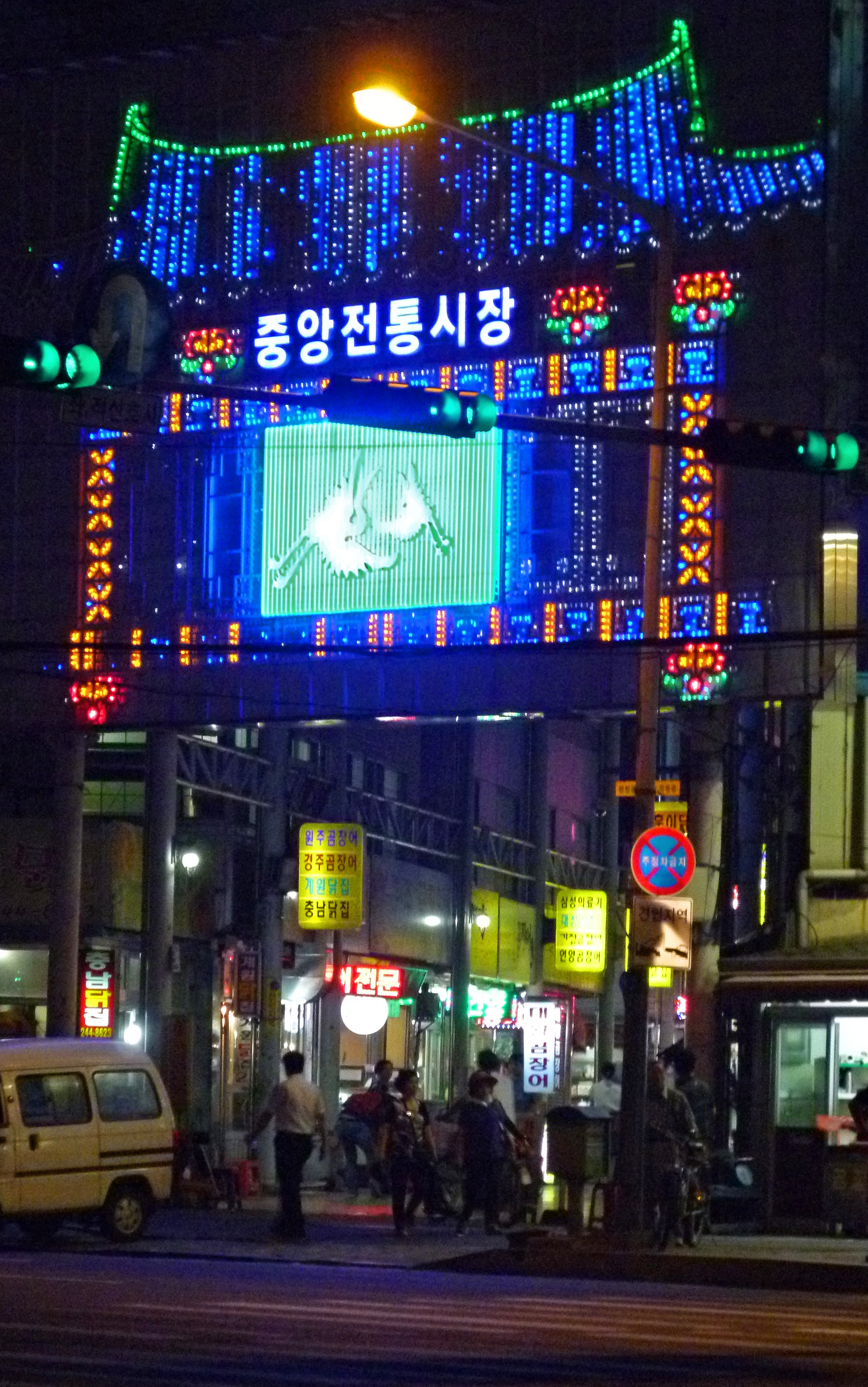
Ulsan Central market entrance.

As the centre of the Ulsan Industrial District, the city is the corporate base of the multinational Hyundai conglomerate. Up to 1962, Ulsan operated as a fishing port and market center. As part of South Korea's first five-year economic plan, Ulsan became an open port. Additionally, the government designated Ulsan as a Special Industrial District, which encouraged development of major industrial plants and factories: an oil refinery, fertilizer plants, automobile production, and heavy industries were developed here. The shipbuilding port Bangeojin was annexed by the city in 1962.

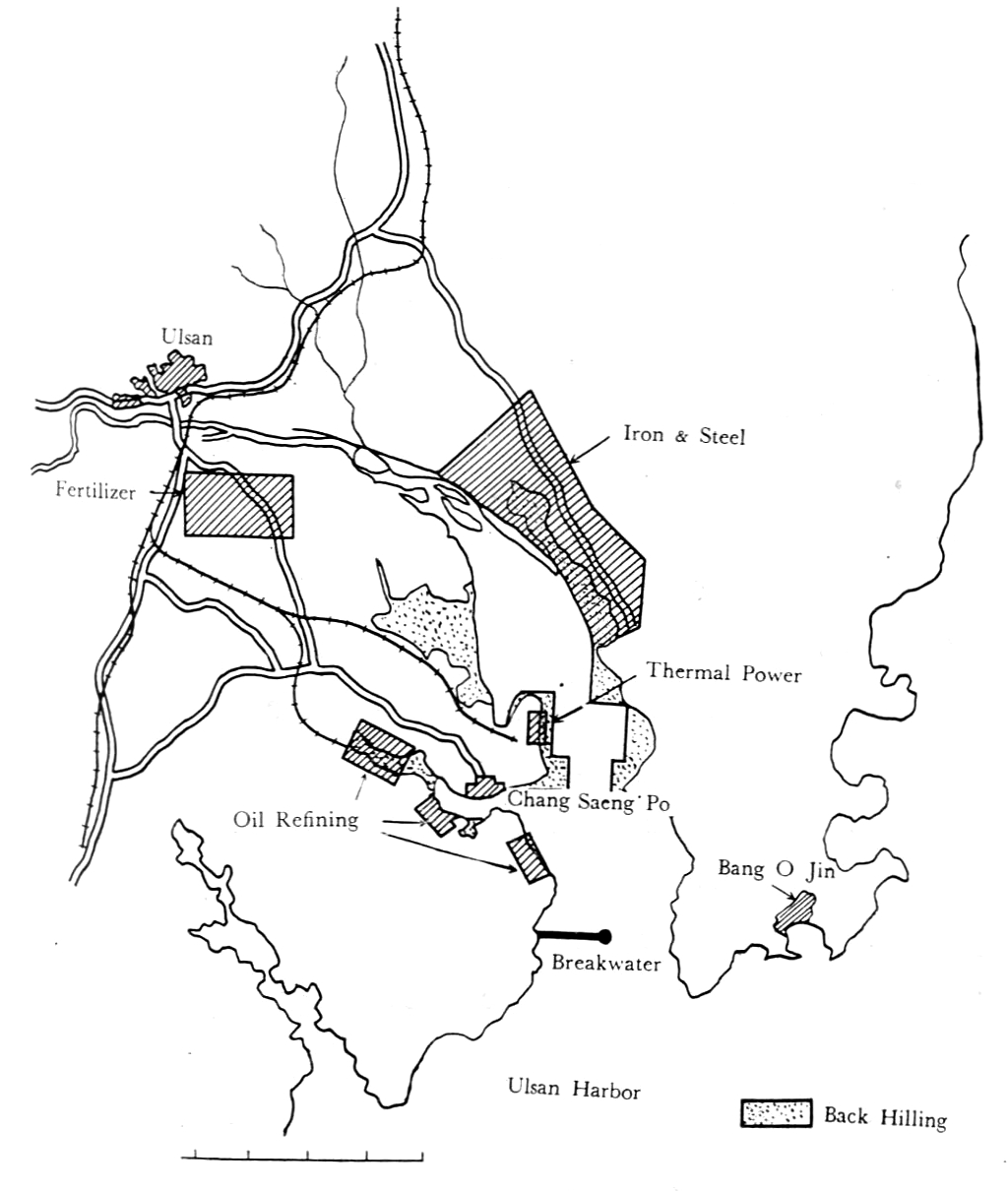
Planned industrial development for the Ulsan Industrial Zone 1962.

Hyundai Group founded Hyundai Heavy Industries in Ulsan in 1973, which effectively turned the city into a company town and drew a large influx of workers into the city. The company's importance to the city can be seen in its name's omnipresence, with a highway named after Hyundai's founder, and the hospital, school, theater, as well as many restaurants and department stores bearing the Hyundai name.

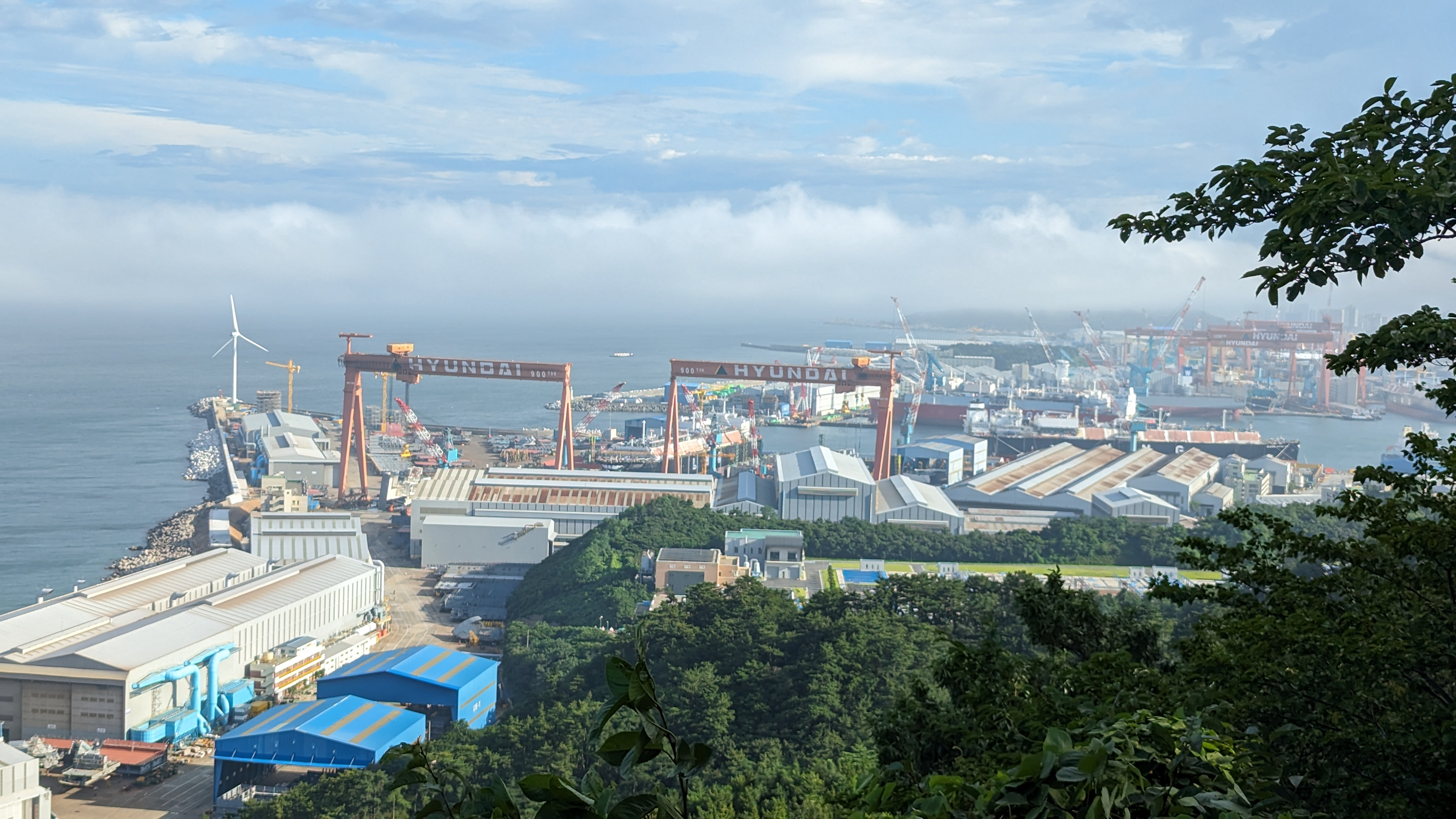
Hyundai Heavy Industries shipyard in Ulsan

Amid a global downturn in shipbuilding, Hyundai Heavy Industries sold $1 billion of assets and laid off large numbers of employees in 2016. The company borrowed money from the state-run Korea Development Bank in order to purchase Daewoo Shipbuilding & Marine Engineering, forming Korea Shipbuilding & Offshore Engineering, with plans to move corporate headquarters to Seoul. Some view this downturn as an indicator of South Korea's over-reliance on chaebols, and fear that a period of deindustrialization for Ulsan mirroring the United States' Rust Belt could be on the horizon.

The city has the world's third largest oil refinery with a refining capacity of 840,000 BPD, owned by SK Energy. A slightly smaller refinery with a refining capacity of 669,000 BPD, owned by S-Oil (majority owned by Saudi Aramco), is also in the city. S-Oil is set to complete the Shaheen Project, one of the world's largest petrochemical facilities with an investment of nine trillion won, by 2026.

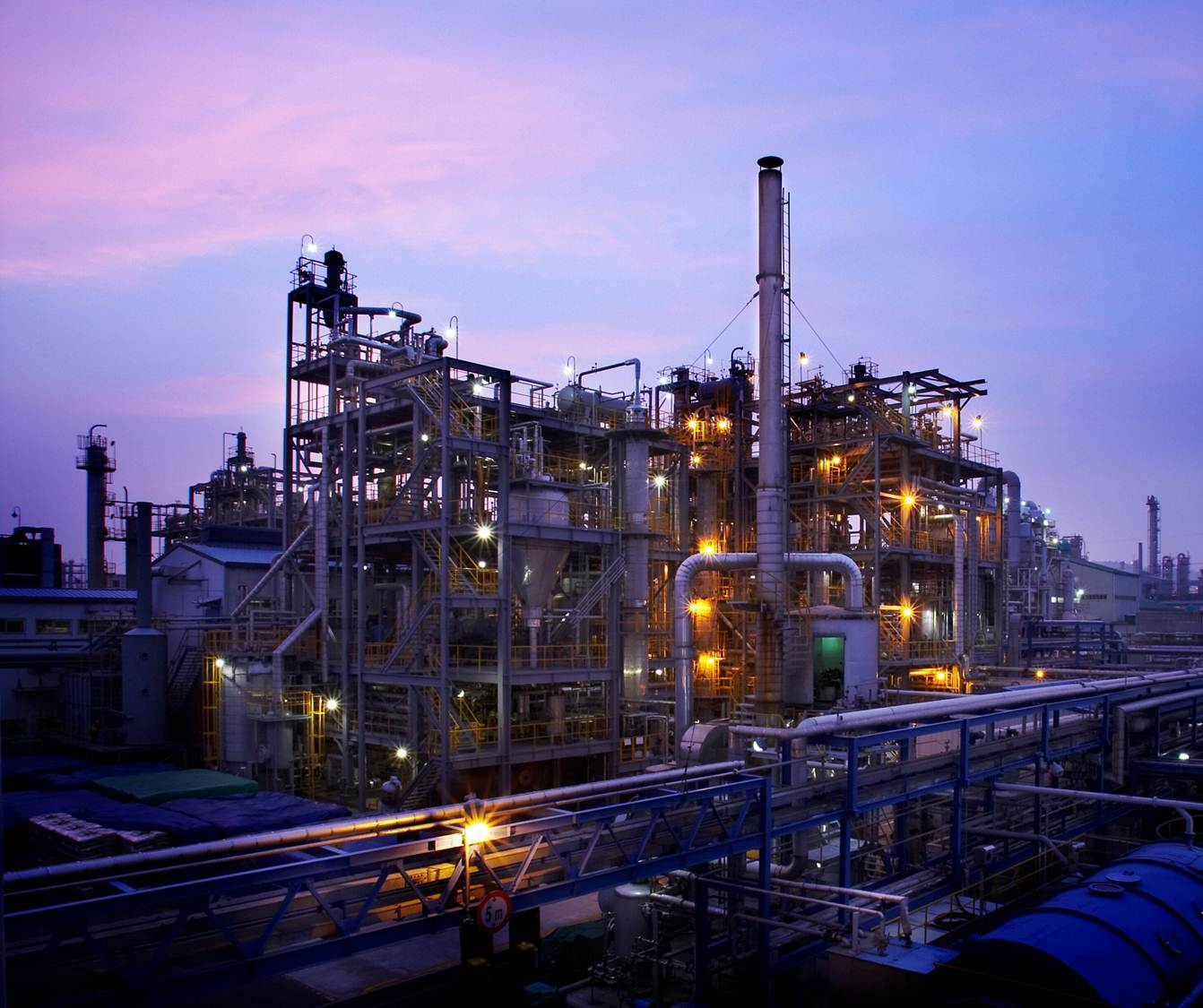
Petrochemical complex in Ulsan

Ulsan is the home of the world's largest automobile assembly plant, with an annual capacity of 1,700,000 units, operated by Hyundai Motors. The plant started with 50,000 capacity in 1968 and has expanded 30 times to become the top complex in the world with its own export piers with logistics competitiveness. Its integrated design of related functions was inspired by the Ford River Rouge Complex in Dearborn, Michigan.

In November 2011, SB LiMotive opened an advanced lithium-ion battery production plant in Ulsan. SB LiMotive was a 50-50 consortium of Samsung SDI and Robert Bosch GmbH. In September 2012, Samsung SDI bought out Robert Bosch GmbH's portion of SB LiMotive for $95 million to gain 100% ownership of the Ulsan production facility. The Ulsan plant is one of Samsung SDI's trio of advanced car-battery production facilities. In 2026, Samsung SDI announced a 16 trillion won investment plan in its Ulsan plant to mass produce solid state batteries.

=== Hydrogen Town ===
The Ulsan Green Hydrogen Town is a hydrogen city being developed as a pilot project. As of October 2024, 188 km of underground pipelines have been laid to connect hydrogen produced as a byproduct from petrochemical complexes to the city center.

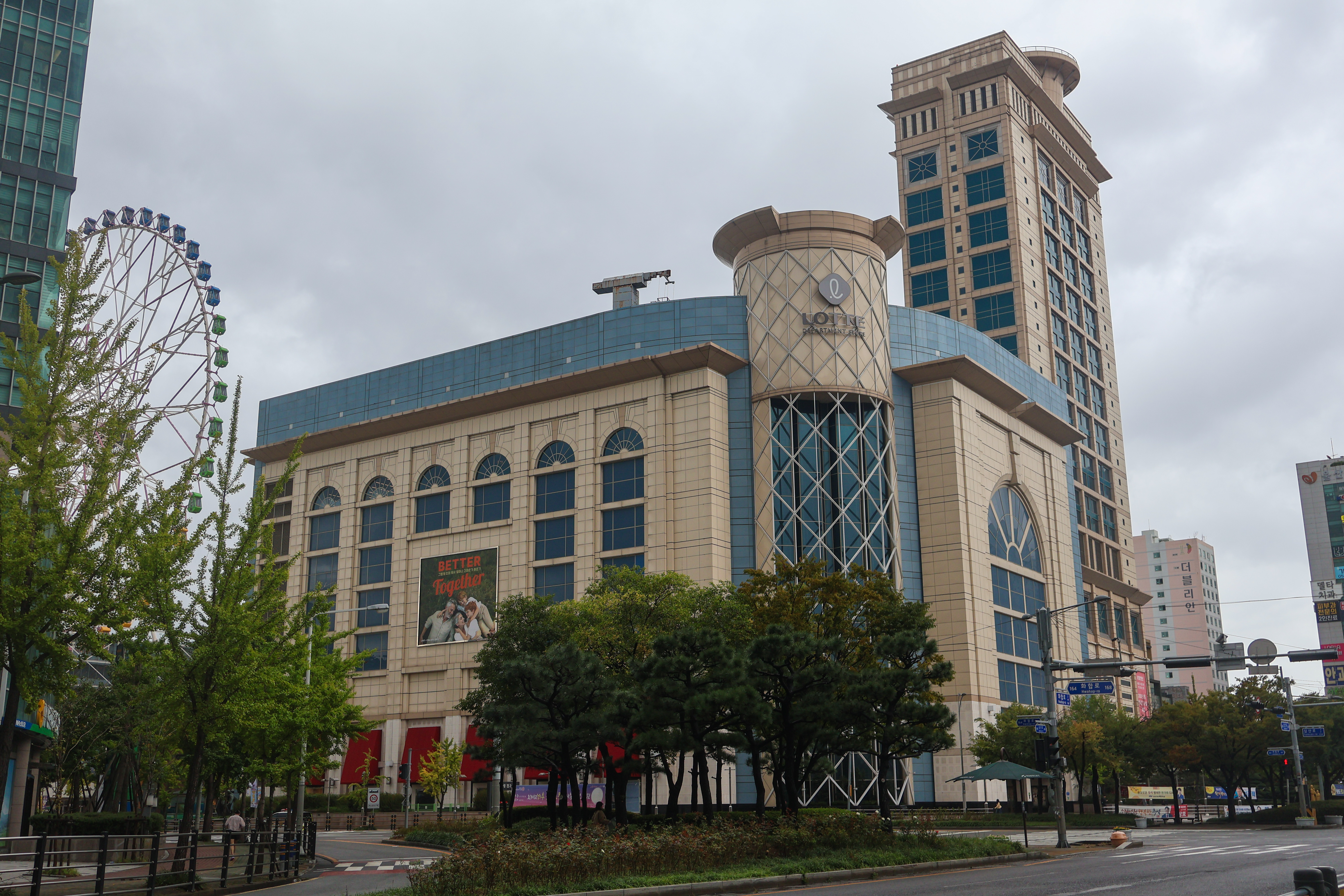
Lotte Department Store in Ulsan

== Education and Research ==
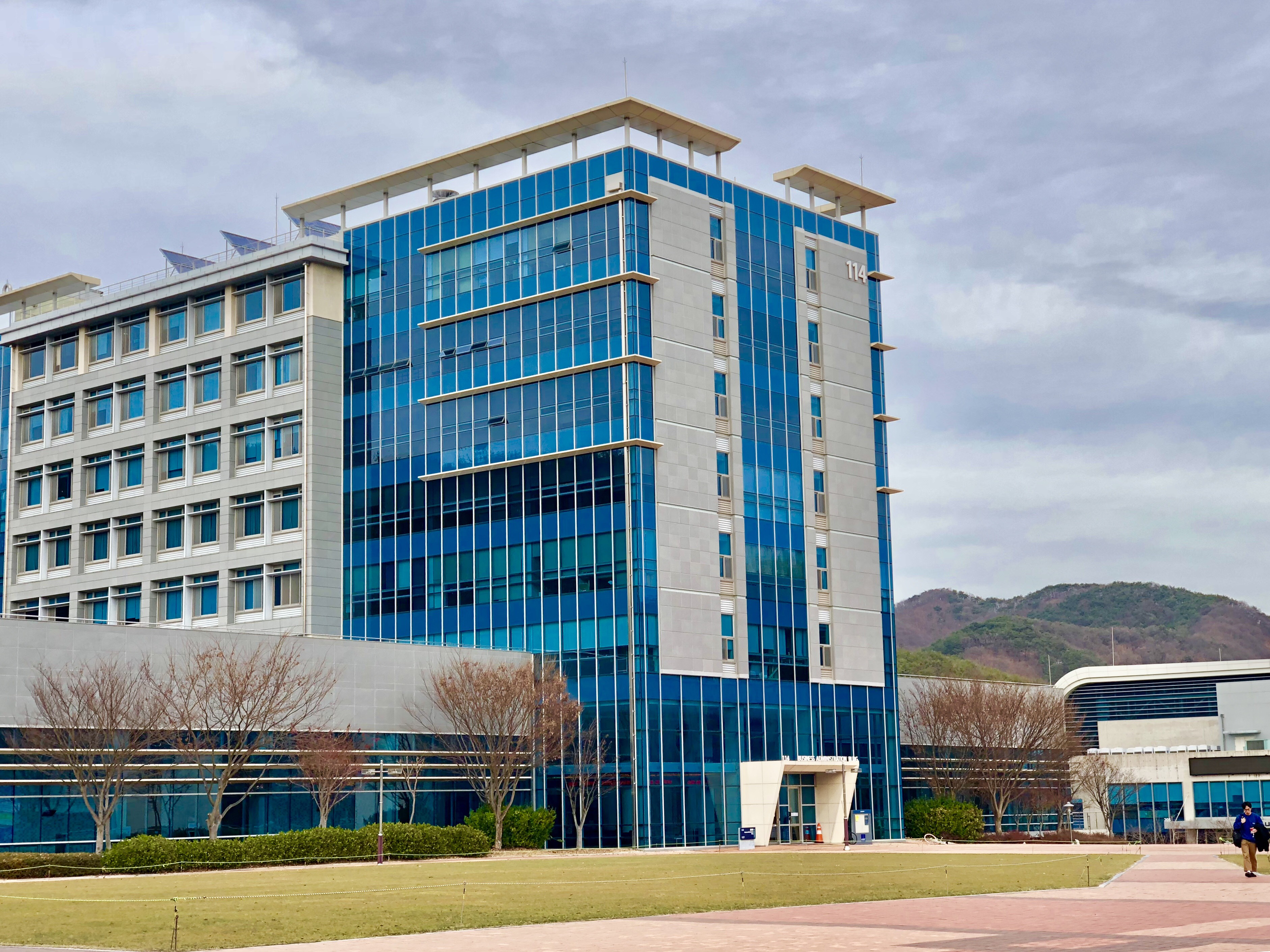
UNIST campus

Ulsan is home to one of Korea’s four national institutes of science and technology, the Ulsan National Institute of Science and Technology (UNIST). It is also home to the University of Ulsan and Ulsan College.

== Transportation ==
The city transport department plans to build a light-rail line. The bus system shows a specific ETA at most bus stops.

Ulsan Airport, constructed in 1970 and expanded in 1997, has more than 20 flights per day to and from Seoul's Gimpo International Airport and 4 flights per week to and from Jeju International Airport. In November 2010, Korea's high-speed train network, the KTX, was extended to Ulsan. This provides a high-speed link to Seoul, with a running time of just over 2 hours. The new KTX station, Ulsan Station, is in nearby Eonyang, with a series of express buses (5001-5005), as well as some city buses serving the new station. The original city station has been renamed Taehwa River Station.

In December 2016, 10 Hyundai ix35 FCEVs, the first hydrogen fuel cell taxis in the country, entered test operation.

== Sports ==
The city hosts the K League 1 football club Ulsan HD FC. After the 2002 FIFA World Cup, they relocated from their former stadium in Jung District, which is now a municipal ground, to the Munsu Stadium, which hosted several matches during the 2002 World Cup. The club have been crowned champions of Asia twice, winning the AFC Champions League in 2012 and 2020. Ulsan was home to another football team, Ulsan Hyundai Mipo Dolphin FC, which played in the Korea National League until 2016, when it was dissolved. Currently, Ulsan is home to another football team, Ulsan Citizen FC, which plays in the K3 League.

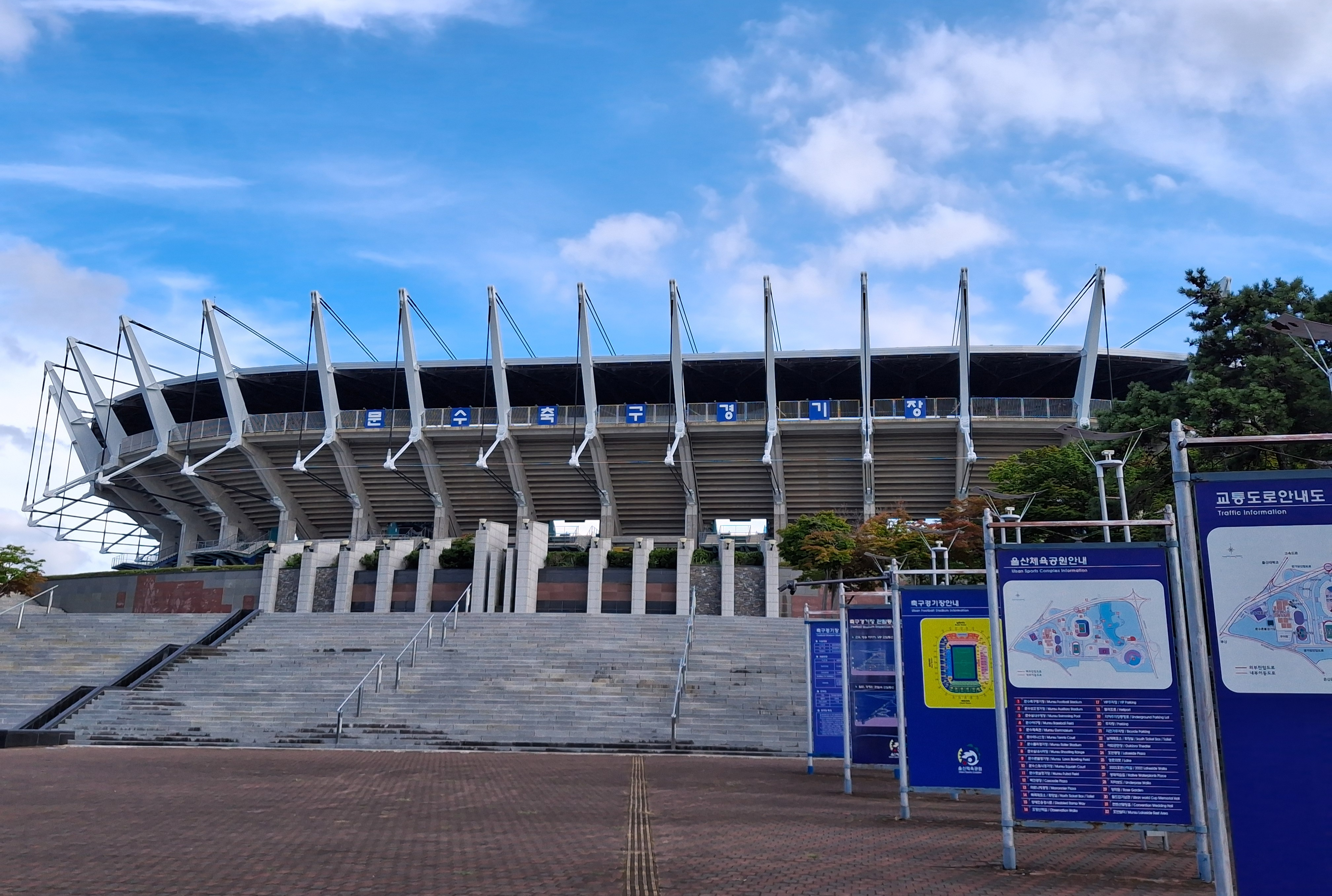
Ulsan Munsu Stadium, home to Ulsan HD

It is also home to the University of Ulsan and its sports programs. Ulsan also hosts Korean Basketball League team Ulsan Hyundai Mobis Phoebus. Their home ground is Dongchun Gymnasium, which is located in Jung-Gu.

Lotte Giants, a KBO League baseball club in Busan, plays some of their home matches at the Ulsan Munsu Baseball Stadium, which they share with the Ulsan Whales, an unaffiliated team in the KBO's official minor leagues.

== Tourist attractions ==
In the Yeongnam Alps, there are seven tall mountains (Gajisan, Sinbulsan, Ganwolsan, Cheonhwangsan, Yeongchuksan, Goheonsan, Jaeyaksan) over 1,000 m above sea level. Sinbulsan (MT.) Ridge, where grasses turn silver in autumn, is one of the best sights to see in the Yeongnam Alps. Eoksae festival is held every early October in Ganwoljae, which is best known for its colony of silver grass. Korea's largest traditional folk Onggi (earthenware) village is Oegosan. The traditional Onggi (earthenware) manufacturing process is carried on here and is open to tourists, including Onggi workshops and kilns. The Ulsan Onggi museum offers a variety of information related to Onggi and displays a variety of this earthenware

As the only whale museum in Korea, Jangsaengpo Whale Museum collects, maintains and displays whaling-related artifacts. They have become more rare since 1986, when whaling was internationally prohibited in order to protect the species. The museum provides a variety of information related to whales and marine ecosystems; it is a space for education, research and experience. Whale cruises depart from Jangsaengpo port.

Ulsan Grand Park is claimed as the best ecology park in a downtown area in Korea, boasting a vast area of 3,640,000 m^{2} (39,180,634 sq ft). "Natural, Clean and Comfortable" are the main themes. It sponsors a variety of events and festivals for families. Notably, there is the Rose Festival every June.

Taehwagang (River) National Garden; Simnidaesup (10-ri bamboo grove), one of the 12 "scenic beauties" of Ulsan, was restored and the river and the bamboo grove are now connected. Visitors can observe wildlife in its natural environment and relax.

Ulsan has beaches (Jinha, Ilsan). Daewangam Park has a hundred-year-old pine forest. Ganjeolgot Cape is the first place to see the sunrise from the Korean peninsula. A sunrise festival is held every New Year's Day.

Ulsan Industry Park has been leading the Pacific Rim industry in the 21st century. Ulsan has Hyundai Motor Company, with the world's largest single-purpose plant; Hyundai Heavy Industries, the biggest heavy industry leader in the world; Hyundai Mipo Shipbuilding, and Petrochemical Park, leaders in Korea's chemistry industry.

== Festival ==
- April : Seo Duk-chul Original Children's Song Competitions
- July ~ August : Ulsan Summer Festival
- December 31 ~ January 1 : Ganjeolgot Sunrise Festival

== In media ==
Ulsan is one of the filming locations of the Munhwa Broadcasting Corporation 2012 South Korean television melodrama series May Queen.

== Sister cities ==
Ulsan's sister cities are:

- Hagi, Japan (1981)
- Hualien, Taiwan (1981)
- Portland, United States (1987)
- Changchun, China (1994)
- Kocaeli, Turkey (2002)
- Santos, Brazil (2002)
- Khánh Hòa, Vietnam (2002)
- Tomsk, Russia (2003)
- Wuxi, China (2013)
- Houston, United States (2021)
- Burgas, Bulgaria (2021)

== Notable people ==
- Kim Young-chul, comedian and singer
- Kim Tae-hee, actress
- Han Chae-ah, actress
- Oh Yoon-ah, actress
- Raina, singer (After School and Orange Caramel)
- Tei, singer
- Seo In-guk, singer and actor
- Yura, singer (Girl's Day)
- Jang Ki-yong, model and actor
- Kim Min-kyu, actor and former Produce X 101 contestant
- Yumdda, rapper
- Lee Wan, actor
- Han So-hee, actress
- Lee So-hee, badminton player
- Kim Su-ji, diver
- Bibi, singer
- Kim Seung-gyu, football player
- Jung Woo-young, football player
- Lee Jae-sung, football player
- Seol Young-woo, football player
- Jasmine H. Yoon, United States District Judge for the Western District of Virginia
- Tarzzan, dancer, rapper and member of AllDay Project

== See also ==
- Bangudae Petroglyphs
- List of cities in South Korea
- List of oil refineries
- List of South Korean regions by GDP
