= EMU-370 =

- Manufacturer: Hyundai Rotem
- Replaced: KTX-I
- Entered service: 2031 (planned)
- Lines served: Gyeongbu HSR (planned); Honam HSR (planned)

Specifications
- Maximum speed: Service: 370 km/h (230 mph); Design (max speed): 407 km/h (253 mph)
- Safety system: KTCS-2
- Multiple working: Up to two trainsets
- Track gauge: 1,435 mm (4 ft 8 1/2 in) standard gauge

The EMU-370 is a high-speed train currently under development by Hyundai Rotem. Its commercial operating speed is 370 km/h (230 mph) and a design maximum speed is 407 km/h (253 mph).

== History ==
On December 22, 2025, the Ministry of Land, Infrastructure and Transport announced that it had completed the development of core technologies for EMU-370, through a national Research and development project. The team succeeded in independently developing six core technologies related to driving resistance, vibration, and noise, which increase sharply when operating at speeds exceeding 350 km/h. On the same day, the Korean government announced plans to begin manufacturing 16 cars in 2026, conduct test runs on the Pyeongtaek - Osong section starting in 2030, and enter commercial operation in 2031.

Kang Hee-up, the Second Vice Minister of Land, Infrastructure and Transport, said, "As a result of joint efforts by the government, public institutions, and private companies to develop technology, we have independently secured the technology to operate at 370 km/h, becoming the second in the world to do so 20 years after the introduction of high-speed rail."

== Development ==
The core technology of the EMU-370 was developed through a national R&D project spanning three years and nine months from April 2022 to December 2025, with a total investment of 22.5 billion won, comprising 18 billion won from the government and 4.5 billion won from the private sector. The project was led by the Korea Railroad Research Institute and involved the participation of seven organizations, including public institutions and private companies. Development was pursued with the goal of increasing the commercial operating speed to 370 km/h by advancing high-speed operation technology, including driving performance and safety, based on the manufacturing technology of the EMU-320, which entered operation in 2024.

== Technology ==
Through four years of technological development, the output of the high-speed motor was improved, and a 560 kW class high-efficiency high-speed motor was developed through optimal design, including the miniaturization and high-density reduction of key components, improved cooling performance, and enhanced insulation performance. As a result, the output increased by 47.4% compared to the EMU-320.

The technologies were developed to improve driving safety and ride comfort while simultaneously reducing air resistance. By smoothing the front of the train and minimizing protrusions such as rooftop air conditioners, driving resistance was reduced by 12.3% compared to the Cheongryong, and lateral vibration acceleration related to the train's side-to-side swaying decreased by more than 30%. Furthermore, while high-speed trains generate significant aerodynamic noise due to the irregular flow of air over the train surface, the interior noise level was lowered by 2 dB to 68–73 dB compared to the EMU-320.

== See also ==
- List of high speed trains
- HEMU-430X
- KTX-Cheongryong
- Rail transport in South Korea
