= KTX-Eum =

South Korean semi high-speed train

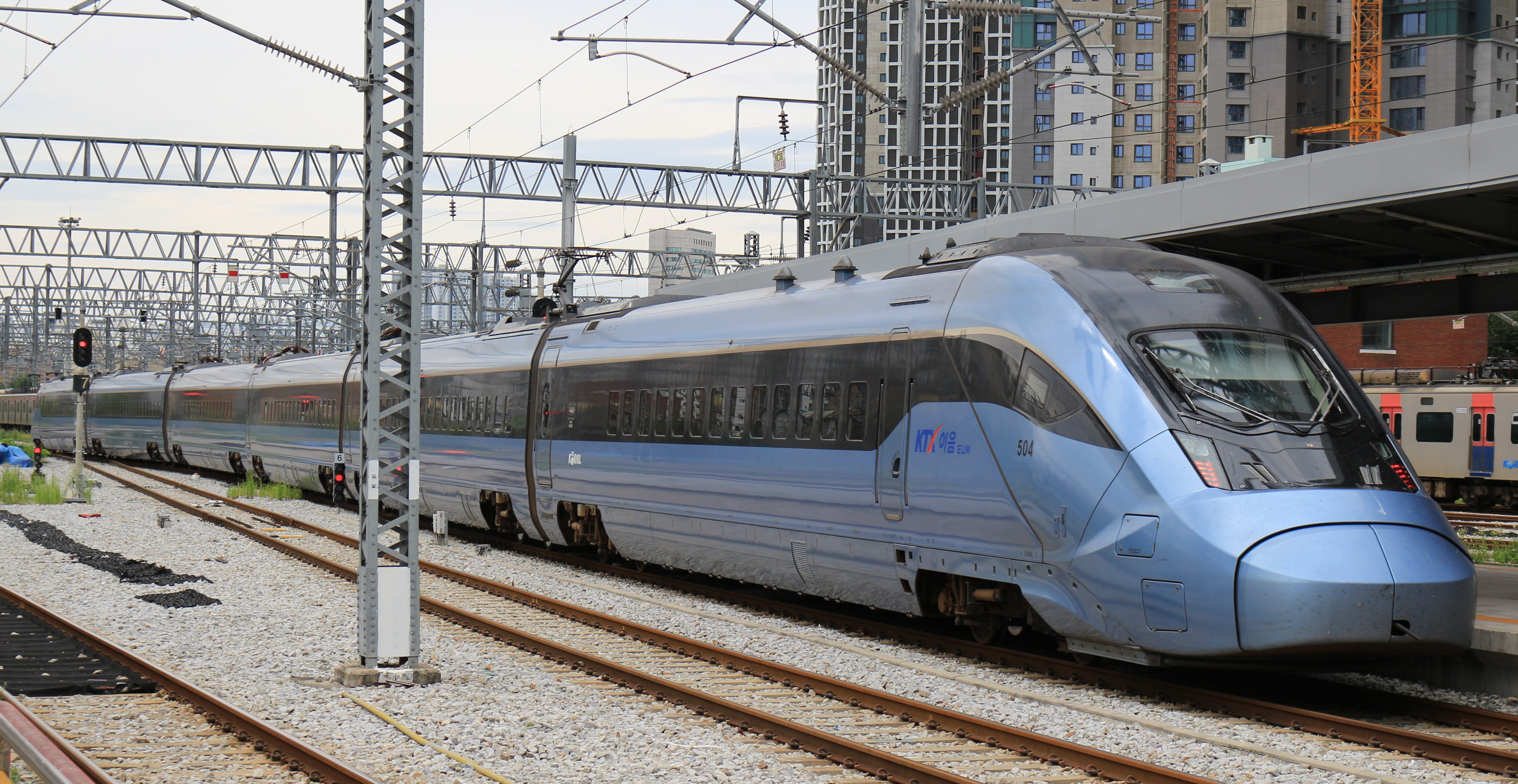
- KTX-Eum at Cheongnyangni station
- Manufacturer: Hyundai Rotem
- Designer: Citrusdesign
- Built at: Changwon, South Korea
- Family name: KTX
- Constructed: 2019–2021, 2024–2025
- Entered service: 4 January 2021
- Number built: 198 vehicles (33 sets)
- Number in service: 198 vehicles (33 sets)
- Formation: 6 cars per trainset TC1-M'1-M1-M2-M'2-TC2: TC - Trailer Control car; M - Motor car; M' - Motor car with Pantograph
- Fleet numbers: 501–519, 521–534
- Capacity: 381 seated: 46 Superior Class (2+2); 335 Standard Class (2+2)
- Operator: Korail
- Lines served: Jungang Line; Gangneung Line; Jungbunaeryuk Line; Donghae Line; Planned: Gyeongjeon Line; Seohae Line; Chungbuk Line; Gyeongchun Line; Mokpo–Boseong Line; Bujeon-Masan Line; Suseo-Gwangju Line; Chuncheon-Sokcho Line

Specifications
- Car body construction: Aluminium
- Train length: 150.5 m (493 ft 9 3/16 in)
- Car length: End cars: 26.25 m (86 ft 1 7/16 in); Intermediate cars: 23.5 m (77 ft 1 3/16 in)
- Width: 3.15 m (10 ft 4 in)
- Height: 4.0 m (13 ft 1 1/2 in)
- Doors: 4 per car, 2 per side (trailer cars); 2 per car, 1 per side (intermediate cars)
- Maximum speed: Service: 260 km/h (162 mph); Design: 286 km/h (178 mph)
- Weight: 318 t (313 long tons; 351 short tons)
- Axle load: max. 15 t (15 long tons; 17 short tons)
- Traction system: IGBT–VVVF
- Traction motors: 16 × 380 kW asynchronous 3-phase AC
- Power output: 8,150 hp (6,080 kW)
- Tractive effort: 226 kN (51,000 lb_{f})
- Gearbox: Voith SE-380
- Acceleration: 2.0 km/(h⋅s) (0.56 m/s^{2}) up to 65 km/h (40 mph); from 0 to 260 km/h (0 to 162 mph) in 253 s and 11.9 km (7.4 mi)
- Deceleration: from 260 to 0 km/h (162 to 0 mph) in 2.408 km (1.496 mi)
- Electric system: 25 kV 60 Hz AC overhead catenary
- Current collection: Pantograph
- Braking systems: Electronically controlled pneumatic brakes (Regenerative, rheostatic, disc, pneumatic)
- Safety systems: ATS, ATP (Hitachi), ATC (TVM-430), KTCS-2
- Coupling system: Scharfenberg
- Multiple working: Up to two trainsets
- Track gauge: 1,435 mm (4 ft 8 1/2 in) standard gauge

The KTX-Eum (Korean: KTX-이음; RR: KTX-Ieum), also known as Korail Class 150000 or EMU-260, is a South Korean high-speed electric multiple unit train manufactured by Hyundai Rotem and operated by Korail. It is the first domestically designed and developed high-speed EMU in commercial service (also the second domestically developed high-speed train in commercial service, the first being KTX-Sancheon) in South Korea.

== History ==
After the development of the experimental HEMU-430X, Hyundai Rotem and Korail signed an agreement in June 2016 to supply high-speed electric multiple units, the first of its kind in South Korea in revenue service (the HEMU-430X is also an electric multiple unit, but it is not for revenue service and mass production). The original order was for five six-car units of EMU-260, but an additional order for 14 six-car units was placed in December 2016; both orders were scheduled for delivery around 2020 to 2021.

In September 2016, Korail held a contest for the public to decide the design of the new models. In 2017, a mockup of the chosen design was exhibited to the public to promote the train and receive feedback. On November 4, 2019, the first set was delivered to Korail.

In August 2020, Korail held a public competition for the name of the new model, which at the time was known as the EMU-260. The model was officially renamed "KTX-Eum" (KTX-이음) in October 2020, after Korail filed patent trademark with the Korean Intellectual Property Office. The word '이음' in Korean means 'link' or 'connection', which could be understood as 'uniting through connection'. This name was selected by members of the public, and expresses the desire to connect regions, people, and happiness through trains.

On January 4, 2021, the train entered service on Jungang Line operating between the electrified section of Cheongnyangni and Andong.

On July 13, 2021, Korail announced the train will be introduced on Gangneung Line from August 1, replacing KTX-Sancheon which would be redeployed to other KTX lines.

On June 19, 2025, it was reported that Hyundai Rotem introduced upgrades to KTX-Eum with significant improvements in noise, vibration, and ride quality. These upgraded trains have been supplied to Korail from 2025 onwards, and feature buffer devices with improved bogie performance, which will increase the strength of the lower part of the car body that would lead to reduced external impact felt by passengers. Noise inside the train cabin will also decrease with improved sound-absorbing material area, as well as sound-absorbing plywood with enhanced sound-absorbing properties on the floor of car body with minimized friction noise from the railway. Similar improvements will also be introduced to the next batch of KTX-Cheongryong trains which are expected to be supplied to Korail and SR Corporation from 2027 onwards.

== Design ==
Technology incorporated in these trains is derived from the experimental HEMU-430X train previously tested by Korail. The KTX-Eum will feature the same design as KTX-Cheongryong trains, but the formation will consist of six cars as opposed to eight cars. Unlike previous generations of KTX trains, the KTX-Eum uses distributed traction with driving trailers at each end and four powered intermediate cars as opposed to a traction head configuration.

== Interior ==
Unlike KTX-I and KTX-Sancheon, the seats on KTX-Eum feature more leg room, wider armrests, USB ports, wireless charging pads, and entertainment displays similar to inflight entertainment systems found on aircraft. In addition, every seat is aligned with the window.

== Export variant ==
In June 2024, South Korea and Uzbekistan concluded a KRW 270 billion (approximately US$196 million at the time) deal to apply KTX technology in Uzbekistan by supplying 6 sets of high-speed trains and Korail expertise. The high-speed trains, UTY EMU-250, is a variant of the KTX-Eum and will have 7 cars in each set. The first train was put into operation in Uzbekistan in May 2026.

== Fleet List in KTX ==
As of February 2026, the fleet is as follows:

Set number	Year delivered	Status
501	2019	In service
502	2020	In service
503	2020	In service
504	2020	In service
505	2020	In service
506	2020	In service
507	2020	In service
508	2020	In service
509	2020	In service
510	2020	In service
511	2021	In service
512	2021	In service
513	2021	In service
514	2021	In service
515	2021	In service
516	2021	In service
517	2021	In service
518	2021	In service
519	2021	In service
521	2024	In service
522	2024	In service
523	2024	In service
524	2024	In service
525	2025	In service
526	2025	In service
527	2025	In service
528	2025	In service
529	2025	In service
530	2025	In service
531	2025	In service
532	2025	In service
533	2025	In service
534	2025	In service
535	2028	
536	2028	
537	2028	
538	2028	
539	2028	
540	2028	
541	2028	
542	2028	
543	2028	
544	2028	
545	2028	
546	2028	
547	2028	
548	2029~	
549	2029~	
550	2029~	
551	2029~	
552	2029~	
553	2029~	
554	2029~	
555	2029~	
556	2029~	
557	2029~	
558	2029~	
559	2029~	
560	2029~	
561	2029~	
562	2029~	
563	2029~	
564	2029~	
565	2029~	
566	2029~	
567	2029~	
568	2029~	
569	2029~	
570	2029~	
571	2029~	
572	2029~	
573	2029~	

== Gallery ==
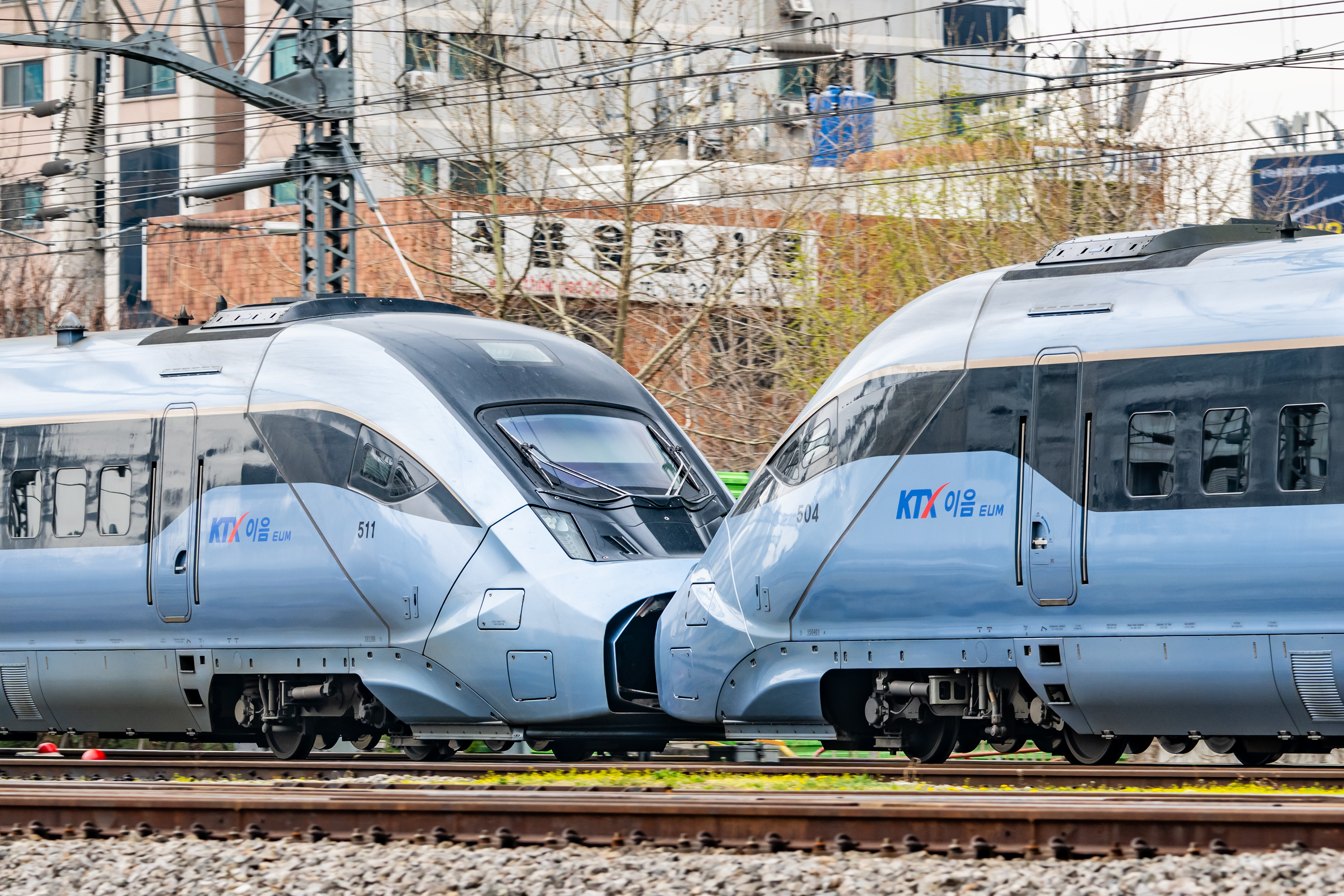
Double-cross operation, Yongsan, Seoul

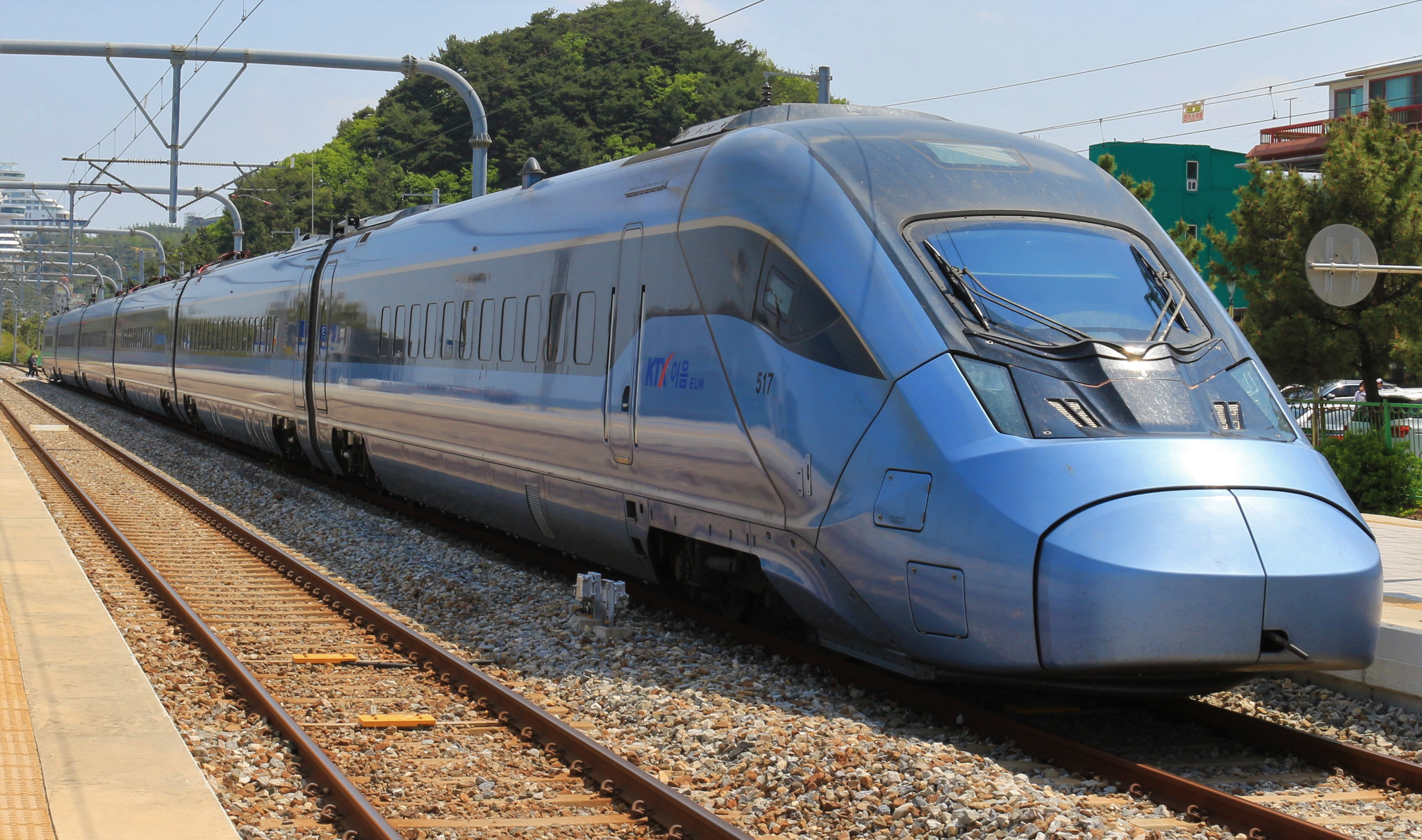
KTX-Eum at Jeongdongjin station

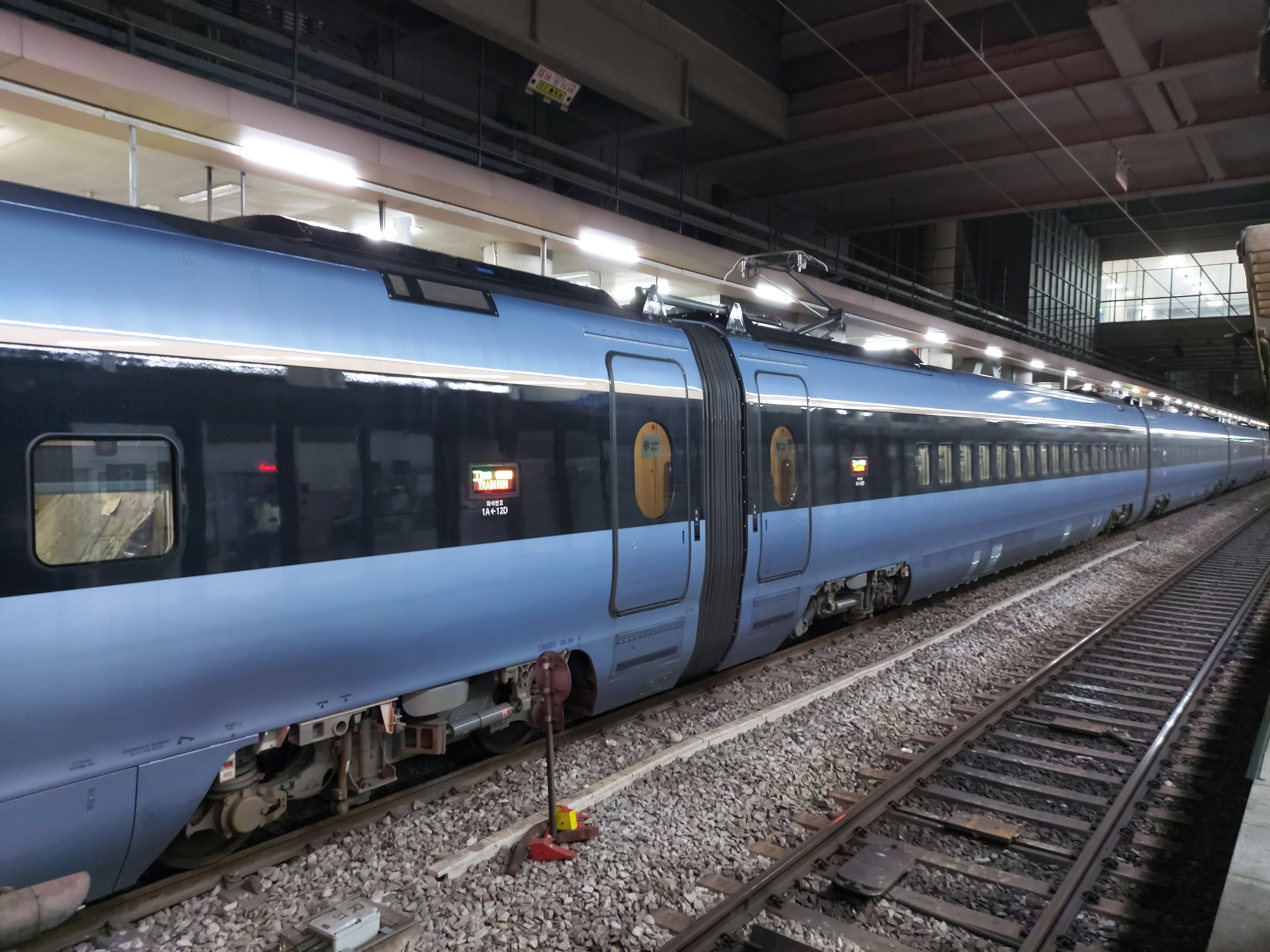
Carriages at Cheongnyangni station

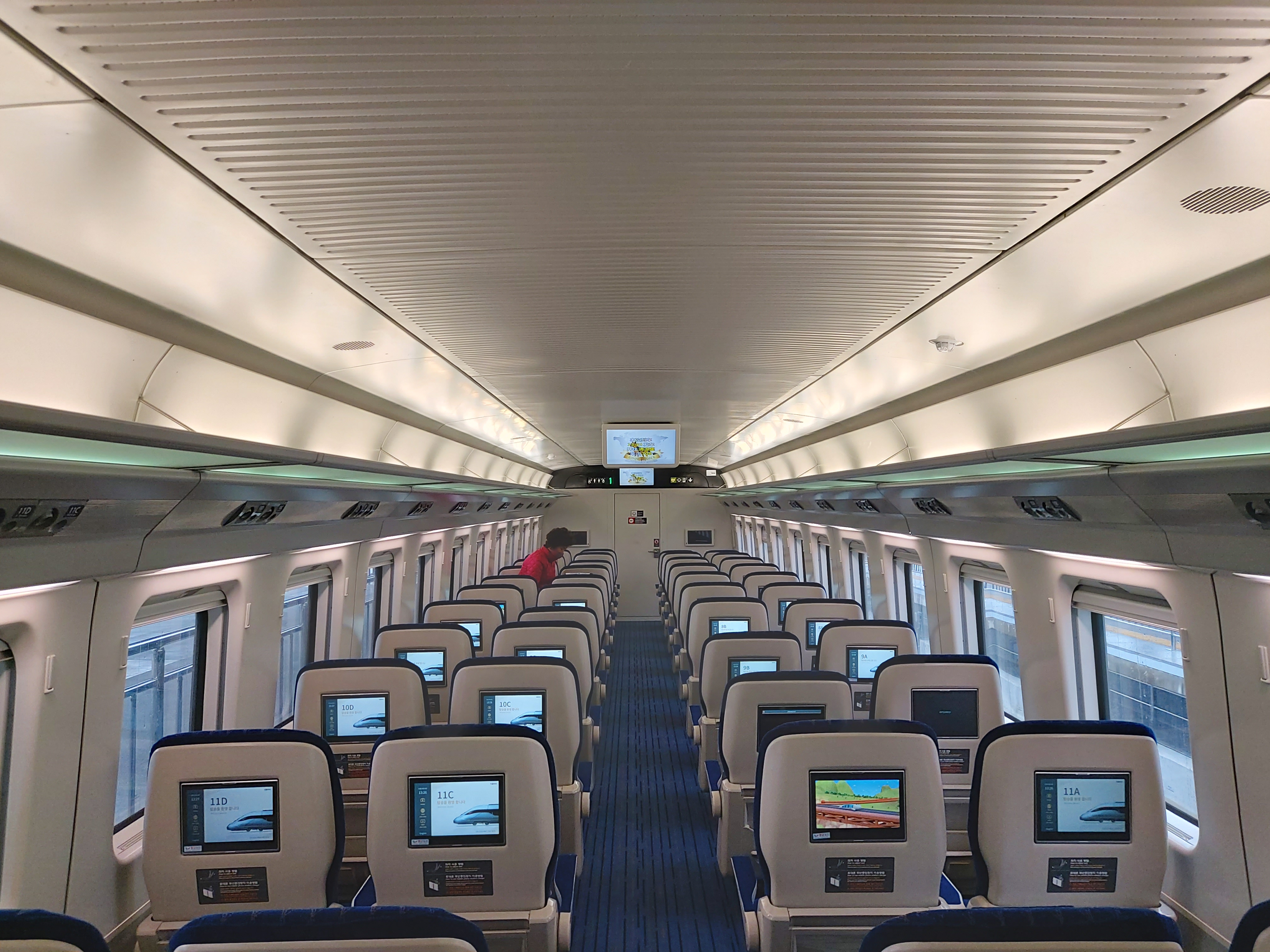
Superior class interior

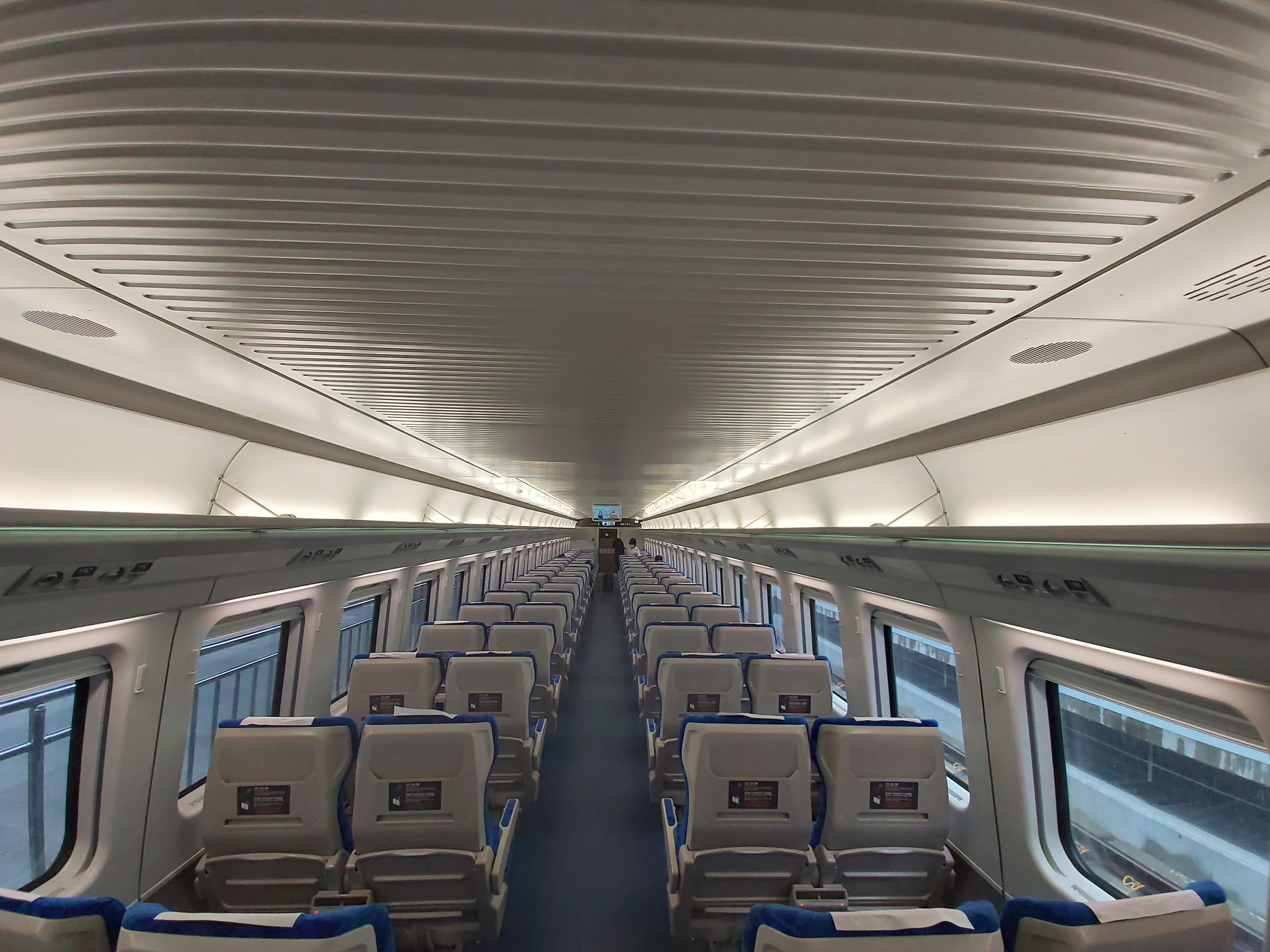
Standard class interior

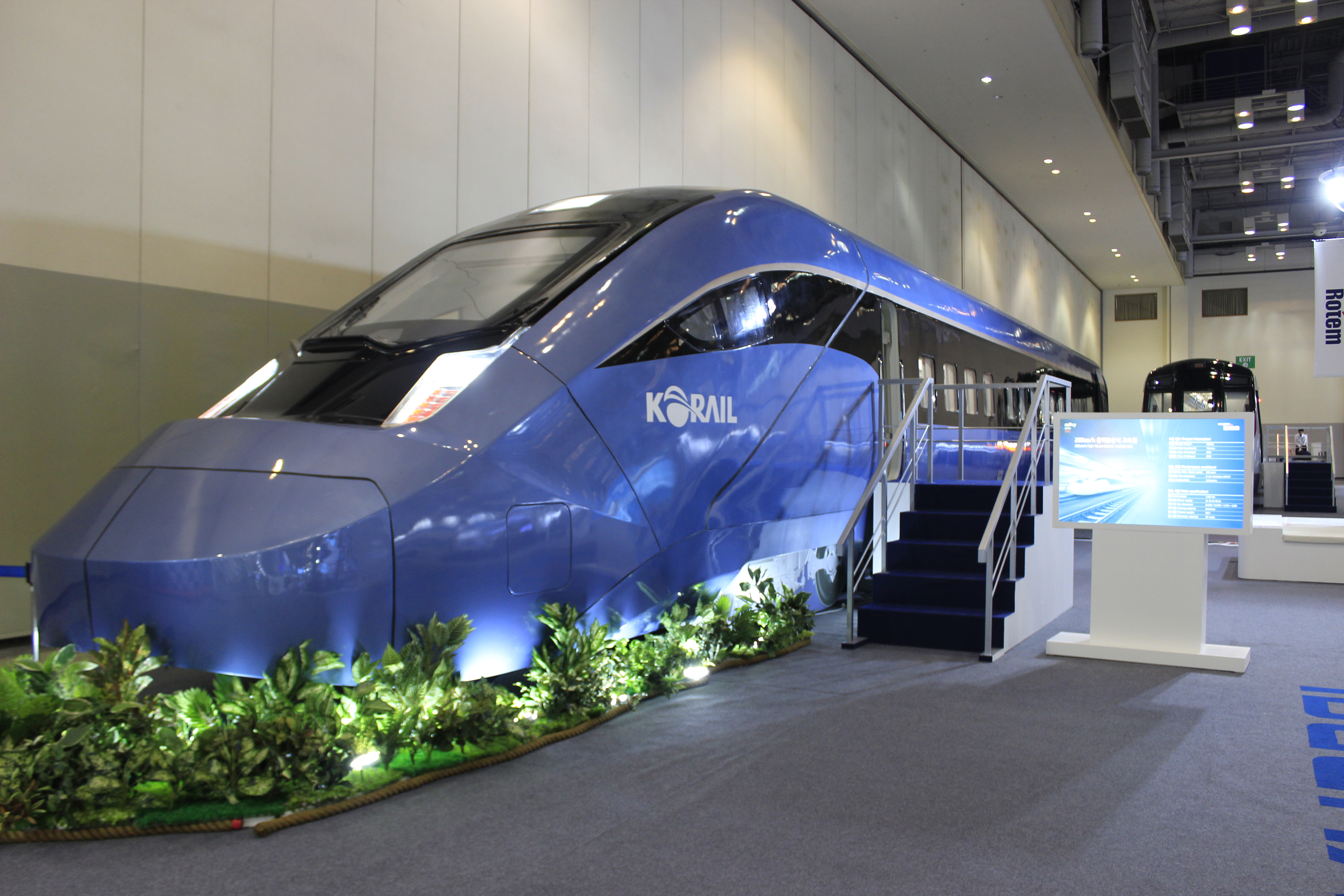
Mockup train of KTX-Eum

== See also ==
- List of high speed trains
- HEMU-430X
- KTX-Cheongryong, another trainset based on the same HEMU-430X project
- Rail transport in South Korea
- UTY EMU-250, a derived model used in Uzbekistan
