= KTX-Cheongryong =

South Korean high-speed train

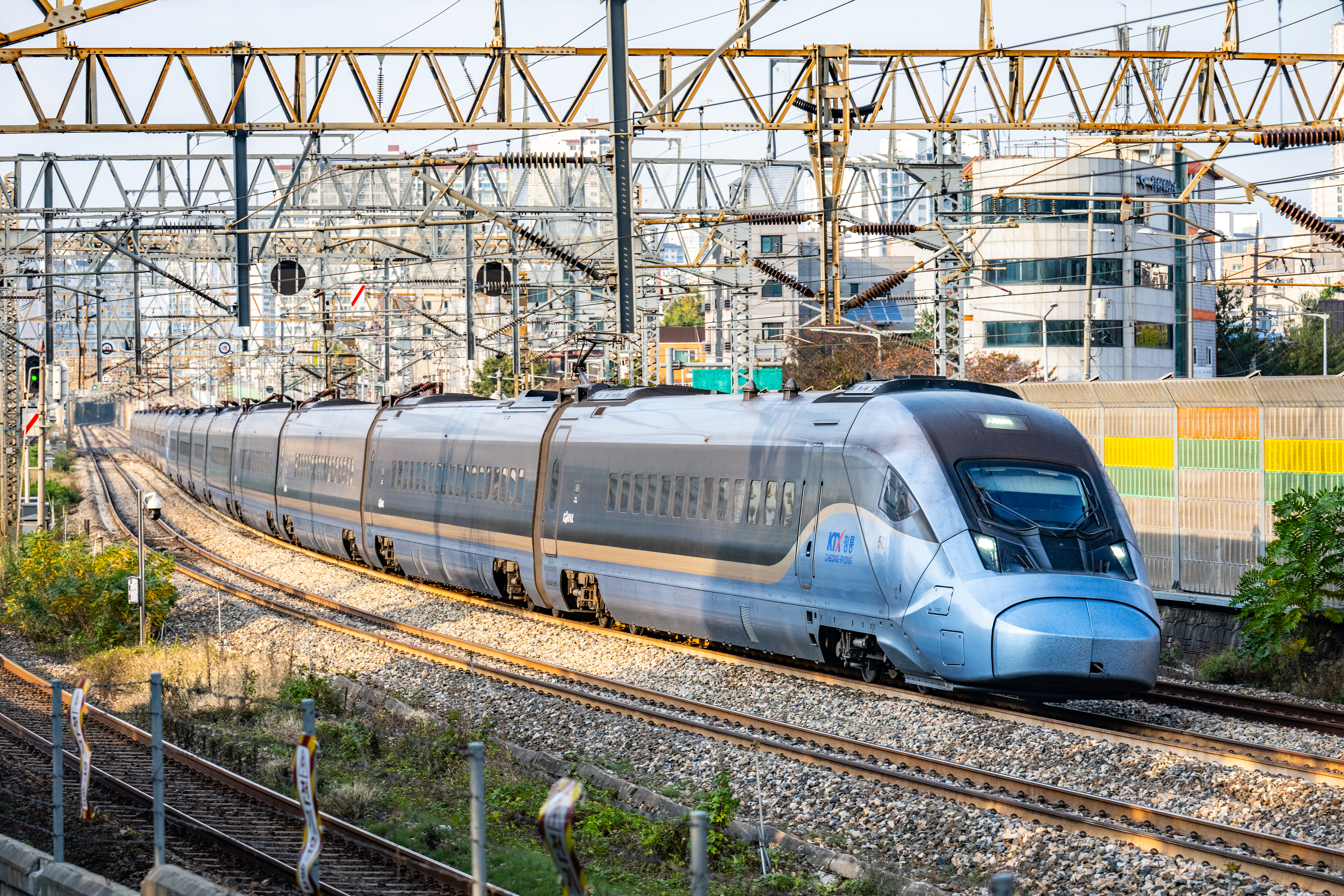
- KTX-Cheongryong in November 2024
- Manufacturer: Hyundai Rotem
- Designer: Citrusdesign
- Built at: Changwon, South Korea
- Family name: KTX
- Constructed: 2020–2022, 2024–present
- Entered service: May 1, 2024
- Number under construction: 216 vehicles (27 sets)
- Number built: 48 vehicles (6 sets)
- Number in service: 16 vehicles (2 sets)
- Formation: 8 cars per trainset TC-M'-M-M-M-M-M'-TC: TC - Trailer Control car; M - Motor car; M' - Motor car with Pantograph
- Fleet numbers: 601–602
- Capacity: 515 seated: 46 Superior Class (2+2); 469 Standard Class (2+2)
- Operator: Korail
- Lines served: Gyeongbu HSR; Honam HSR

Specifications
- Car body construction: Aluminium
- Train length: 199.1 m (653 ft 2 9/16 in)
- Car length: End cars: 26.25 m (86 ft 1 7/16 in); Intermediate cars: 23.5 m (77 ft 1 3/16 in)
- Width: 3.15 m (10 ft 4 in)
- Height: 4.0 m (13 ft 1 1/2 in)
- Doors: 2 per side per end car, 1 per side per intermediate car
- Maximum speed: Service: 305 km/h (190 mph); Design (commercial speed): 320 km/h (199 mph); Design (max speed): 352 km/h (219 mph)
- Weight: 437 t (430 long tons; 482 short tons)
- Axle load: max. 15 t (15 long tons; 17 short tons)
- Traction system: IGBT–VVVF
- Traction motors: 24 × 380 kW asynchronous 3-phase AC
- Power output: 9,120 kW (12,230 hp)
- Tractive effort: 303 kN (68,000 lb_{f})
- Gearbox: Voith SE-380
- Acceleration: 0.56 m/s^{2} (2.0 km/(h⋅s)) up to 100 km/h (62 mph); from 0 to 300 km/h (0 to 186 mph) in 212 s
- Deceleration: from 300 to 0 km/h (186 to 0 mph) in 4 km (2.5 mi)
- Electric system: 25 kV 60 Hz AC overhead catenary
- Current collection: Pantograph
- UIC classification: 2′2′+Bo′Bo′+Bo′Bo′+Bo′Bo′+Bo′Bo′+Bo′Bo′+Bo′Bo′+2′2′
- Braking systems: Electronically controlled pneumatic brakes (Regenerative, rheostatic, disc, pneumatic)
- Safety systems: ATS, ATP (Hitachi), ATC (TVM-430), KTCS-2
- Coupling system: Scharfenberg
- Multiple working: Up to two trainsets
- Track gauge: 1,435 mm (4 ft 8 1/2 in) standard gauge

The KTX-Cheongryong (Korean: KTX-청룡; Hanja: KTX-靑龍), also known as Korail Class 160000 or EMU-320, is a South Korean high-speed electric multiple unit train manufactured by Hyundai Rotem and operated by Korail. It is the second domestically designed and developed high-speed EMU in commercial service (the first being KTX-Eum) in South Korea, which marks the departure of the country's high-speed rail rolling stock from TGV-style power car-unpowered trailer configuration.

== History ==
After the development of the experimental HEMU-430X, Hyundai Rotem and Korail signed multiple agreements from June to December 2016 to supply high speed electric multiple units, the first of its kind in South Korea in revenue service (the HEMU-430X is also an electric multiple unit, but it is not for revenue service and mass production). The agreements involve ordering of two variants: 2 eight-car EMU-320 units (with an operating speed of 320 km/h) and 19 six-car EMU-260 units, to be delivered around 2020 to 2021.

In September 2016, Korail held a contest for the public to decide the design of the new models. In 2017, a mockup of the chosen design was exhibited to the public to promote the sister train (EMU-260) and receive feedback.

On March 28, 2022, it was reported that the EMU-320 consisting of 25 units for Korail and 19 units for SR Corporation (now merged into Korail) were scheduled to be delivered from December 2023 (the revised numbers as in later reports shown below are 17 units (19 units if the initial orders are included) and 14 units, respectively). However, this was delayed mainly because some elements of the EMU-320 had to be re-designed due to serious concerns about excessive noise levels in the cab and passenger compartments. To reduce noise levels, measures including improving the pantograph's shape and adding sound insulation to the ceiling and floor have been taken. Hyundai Rotem had to pay 19 billion won in damages for the delay in delivery. The two pre-series sets built by Hyundai Rotem following a 2016 contract were delivered to Korail in November 2023 and were expected to begin operations in 2024.

The model was officially named "KTX-Cheongryong" (KTX-청룡) in April 2024, where the word 'Cheongryong' (Korean: 청룡; Hanja: 靑龍; RR: Cheongnyong) in Korean means 'blue dragon'. This name was selected by members of the public, which signifies "a blue dragon soaring vigorously to bring hope to the people" and matches the Year of the Blue Dragon (i.e. 2024) according to the Korean zodiac.

The two pre-series sets entered service on the Gyeongbu high-speed railway and Honam high-speed railway since May 1, 2024. The remaining 17 trainsets ordered by Korail are scheduled to be delivered between April 2027 and March 2028, and another 14 trainsets to be delivered to Korail from 2027 onwards.

In September 2024, the EMU-320 high-speed train (the original name is used for further research and sales after naming as KTX-Cheongryong in South Korea) obtained the design certification of Technical Specification for Interoperability (TSI), which paved the way for Hyundai Rotem into the European high-speed rail market.

In June 2025, it was reported that Hyundai Rotem introduced upgrades to KTX-Eum with significant improvements in noise, vibration, and ride quality. These upgraded trains have been supplied to Korail from 2025 onwards, and similar improvements will also be introduced to the next batch of KTX-Cheongryong trains which are expected to be supplied to Korail from 2027 onwards. The upgraded trains feature buffer devices with improved bogie performance, which will increase the strength of the lower part of the car body that would lead to reduced external impact felt by passengers. Noise inside the train cabin will also decrease with improved sound-absorbing material area, as well as sound-absorbing plywood with enhanced sound-absorbing properties on the floor of car body with minimized friction noise from the railway.

In December 2025, the first sets of the second-generation KTX-Cheongryong were rolled out of production line. They are expected to be delivered to Korail by December 2026, which is four months ahead of schedule. When compared with the first-generation, the second-generation KTX-Cheongryong is known to have improved passenger amenities, reduced noise, better ride comfort, safety, and convenience, better performance of air conditioning system, and shortened braking distance.

== Design ==
Technology incorporated in these trains is derived from the experimental HEMU-430X train previously tested by Korail. The KTX-Cheongryong will feature the same design as KTX-Eum trains, however the formation will consist of eight cars as opposed to six cars. Unlike the previous generations of KTX trains, the KTX-Cheongryong uses distributed traction with driving revenue cars at each end and six powered intermediate cars as opposed to a TGV-style power car-unpowered trailer configuration.

Aerodynamic changes to the front of the train are claimed to offer 10% lower resistance compared to previous high speed trains in South Korea. Trains will be equipped with sliding steps to cater for high and low platform heights. Seats in both first and second class will be capable of being rotated to face the direction of travel from a single control unit.

The train can accelerate from 0 to 300 km/h (0 to 186 mph) in 212 seconds, in contrast to 316 seconds for the KTX-Sancheon.

== Interior ==
Unlike KTX-I and KTX-Sancheon, the seats on KTX-Cheongryong feature more leg room, wider armrests, USB ports, wireless charging pads, and entertainment displays similar to the inflight entertainment system found on aircraft. In addition, every seat is aligned with a window.

== Gallery ==
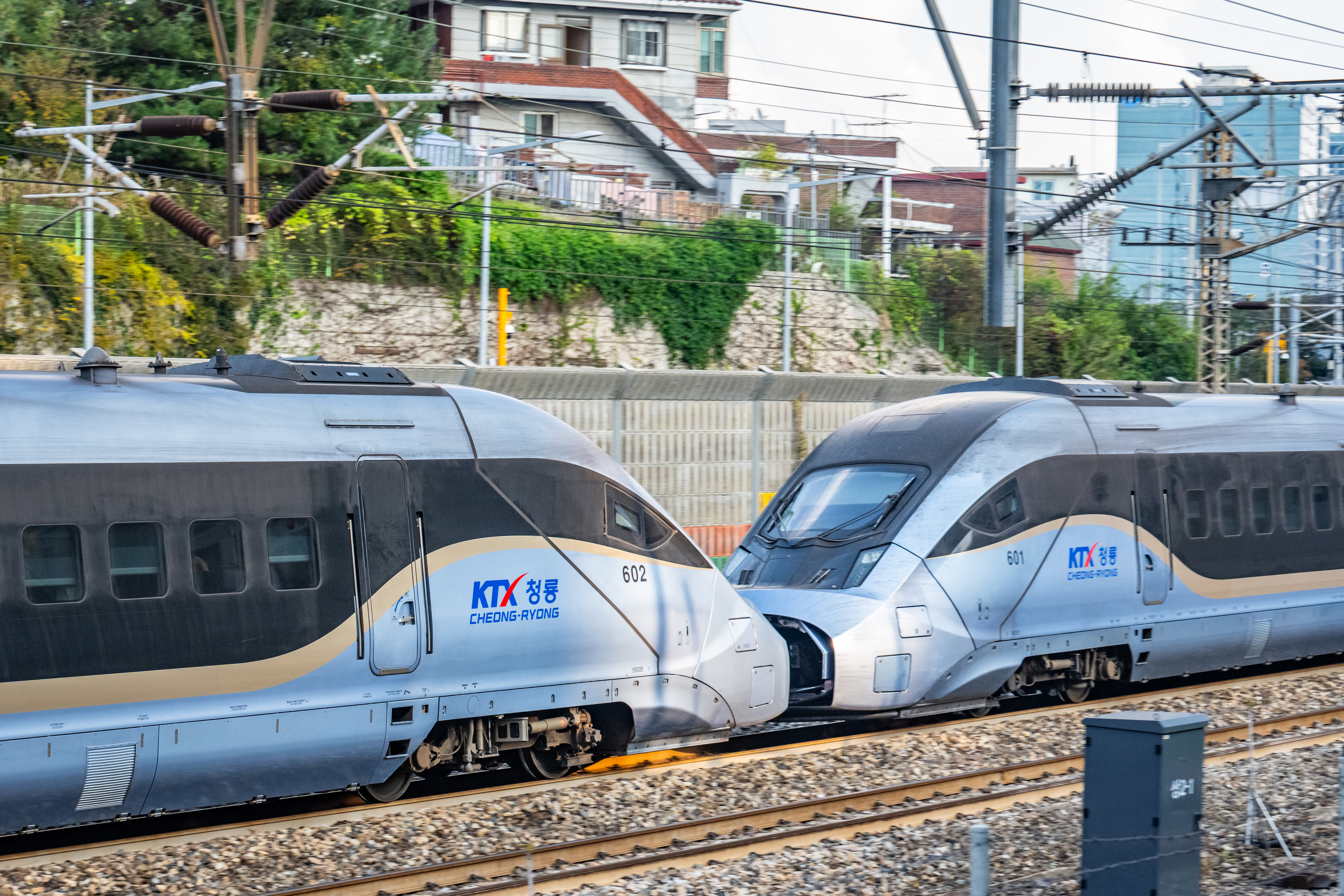
Double-cross operation

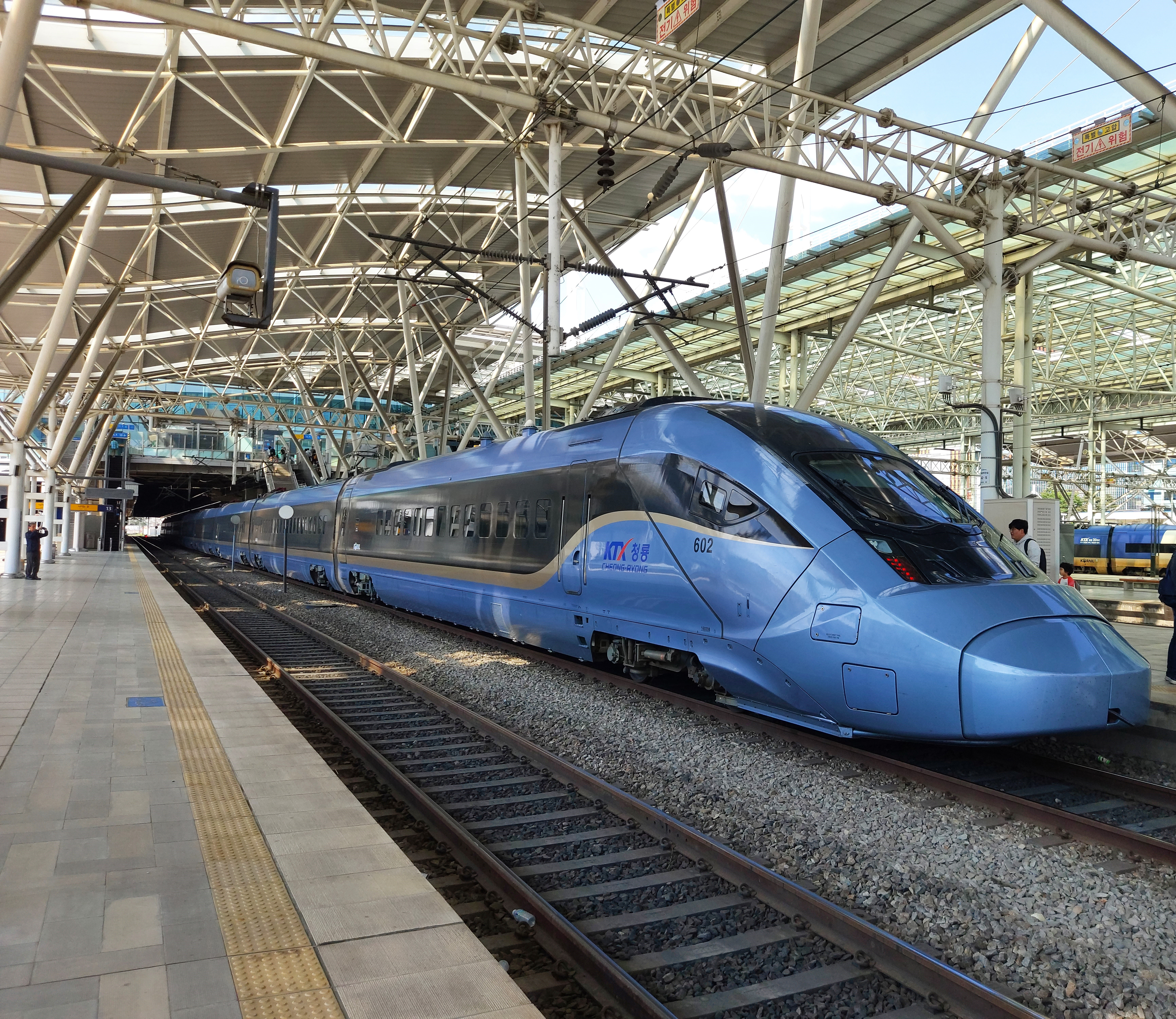
KTX-Cheongryong at Seoul station

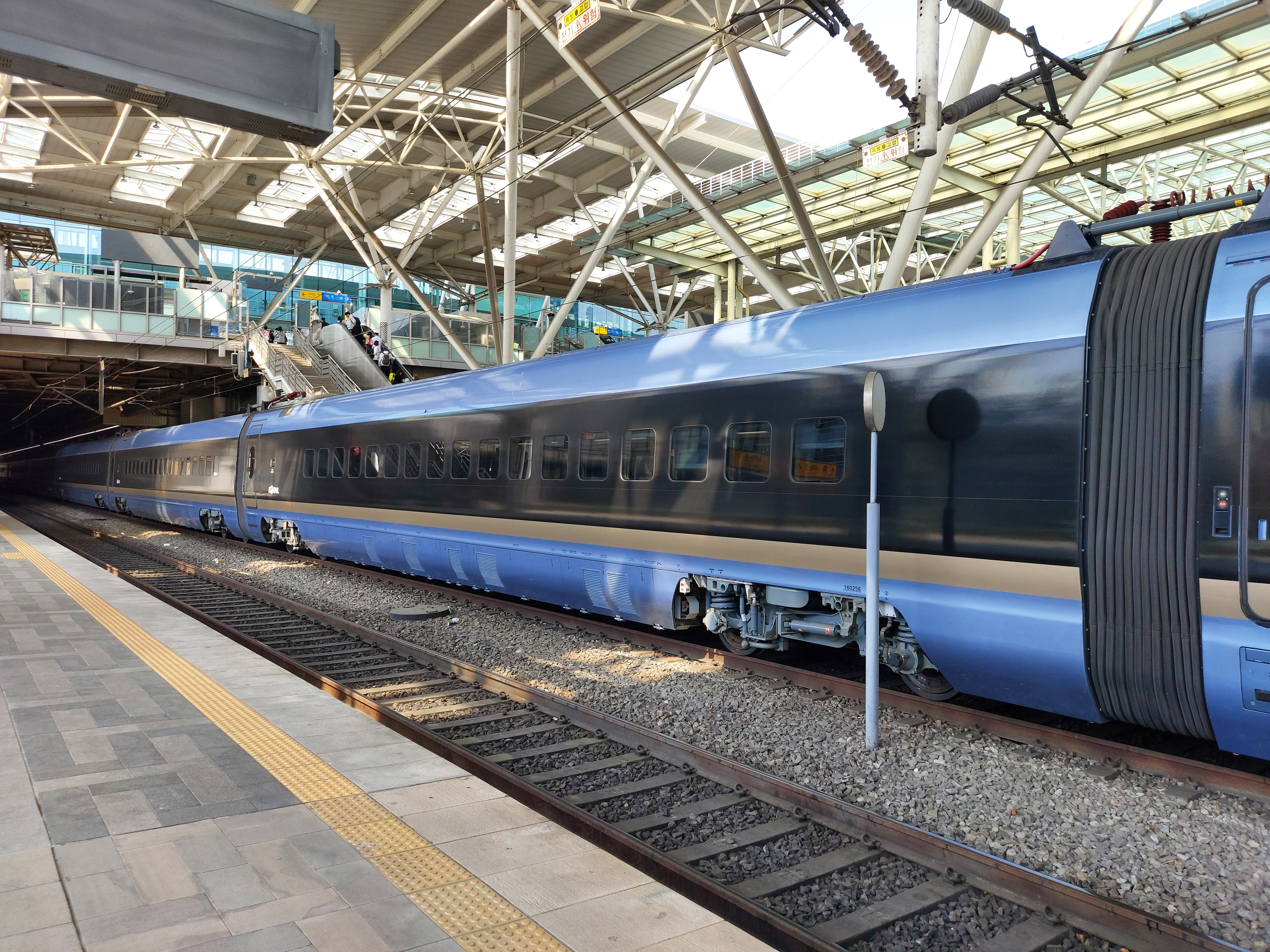
Carriages of KTX-Cheongryong

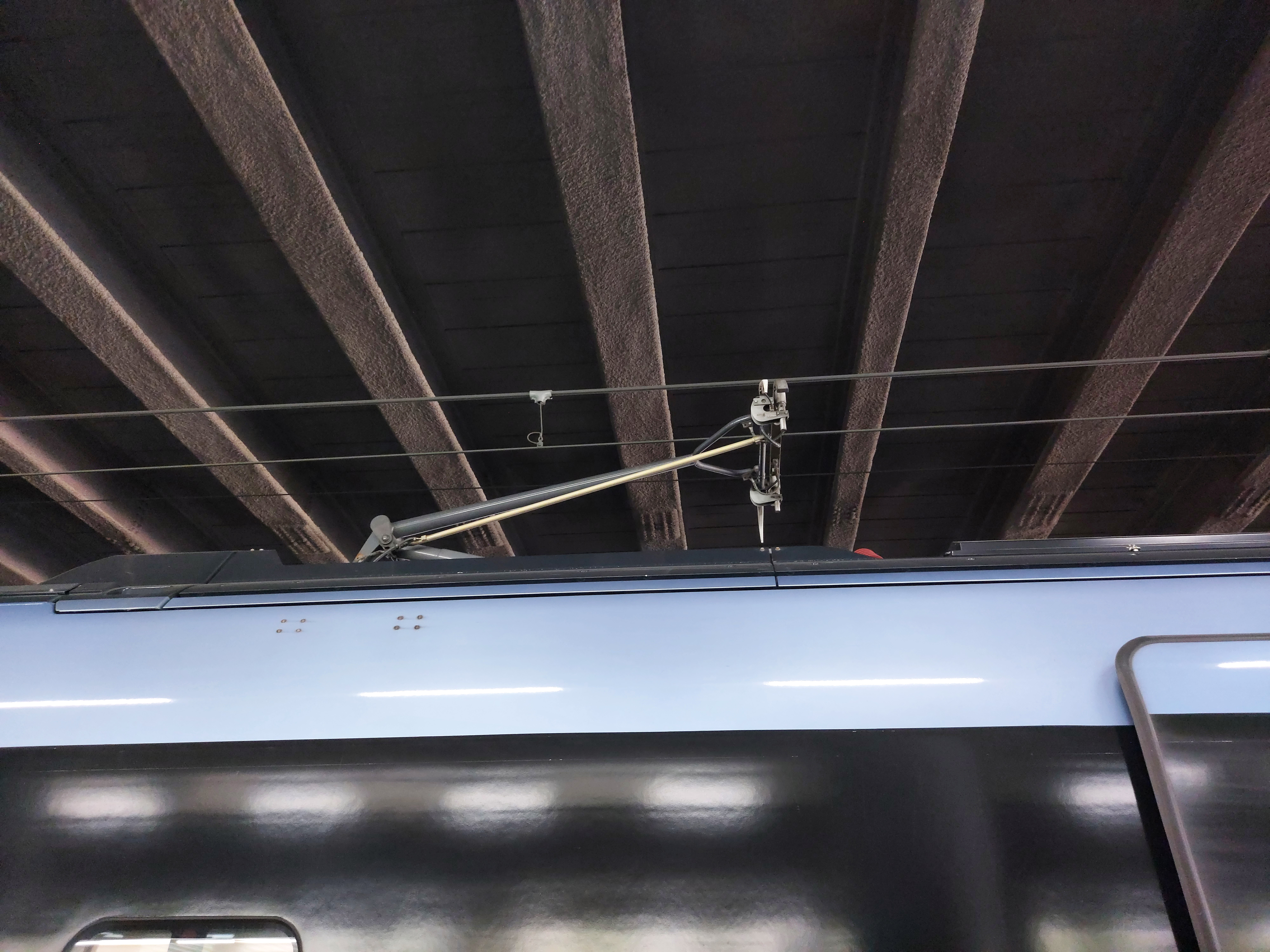
Pantograph of KTX-Cheongryong

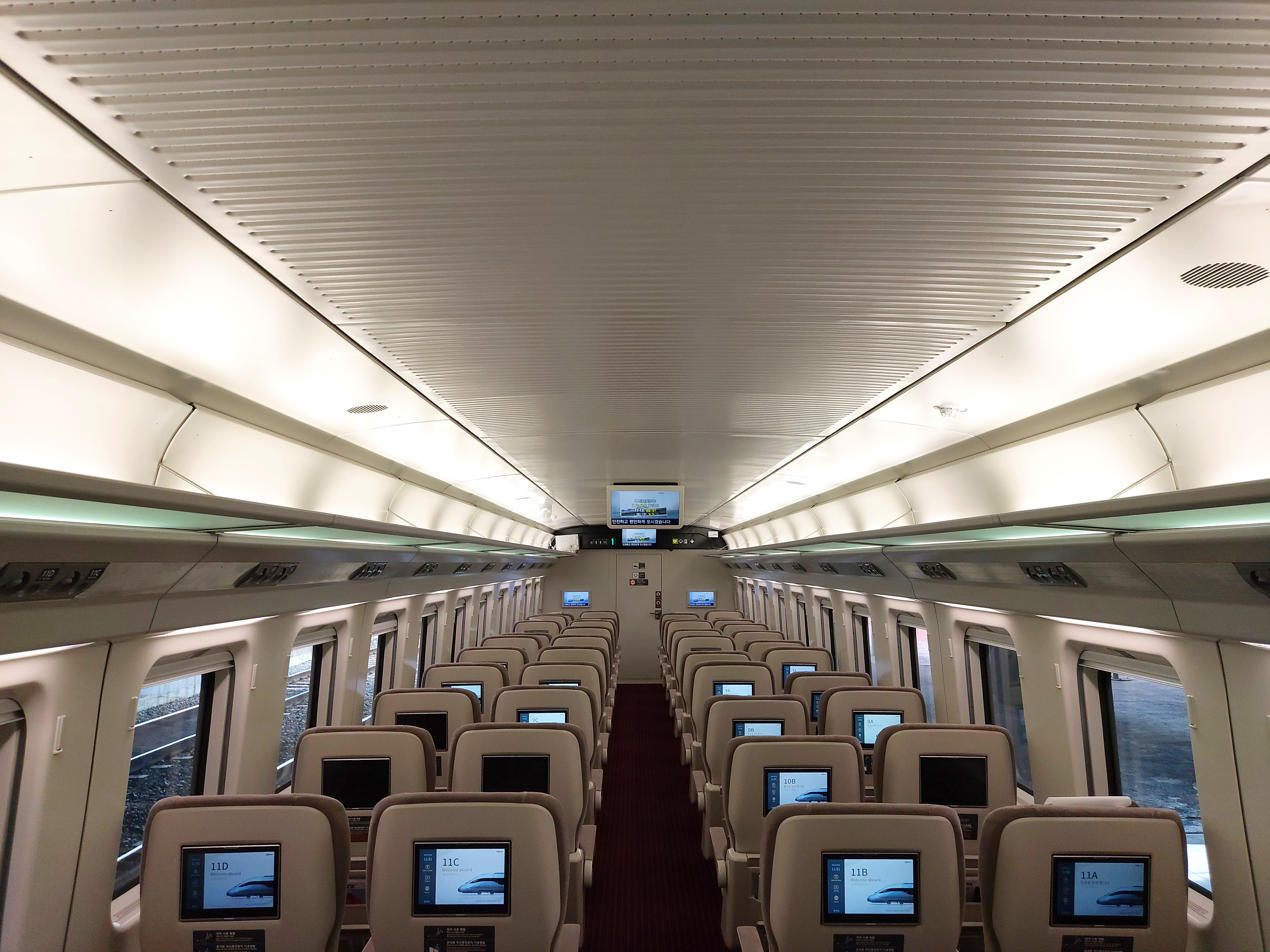
Superior class interior

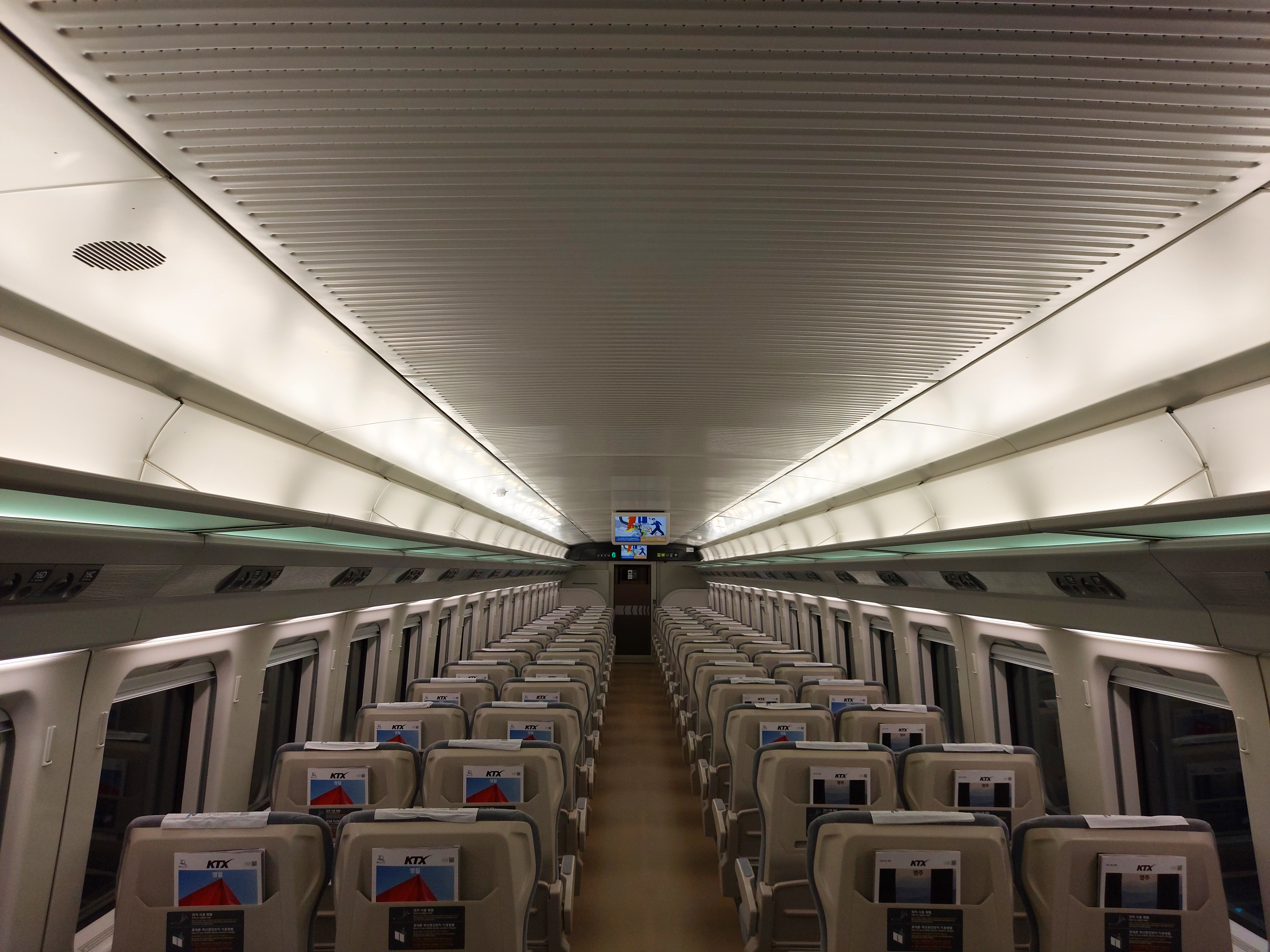
Standard class interior

== See also ==
- List of high speed trains
- HEMU-430X
- KTX-Eum, another trainset based on the same HEMU-430X project
- EMU-370, currently under development with technology based on this train
- Rail transport in South Korea
