= HEMU-430X =

South Korean experimental high-speed train

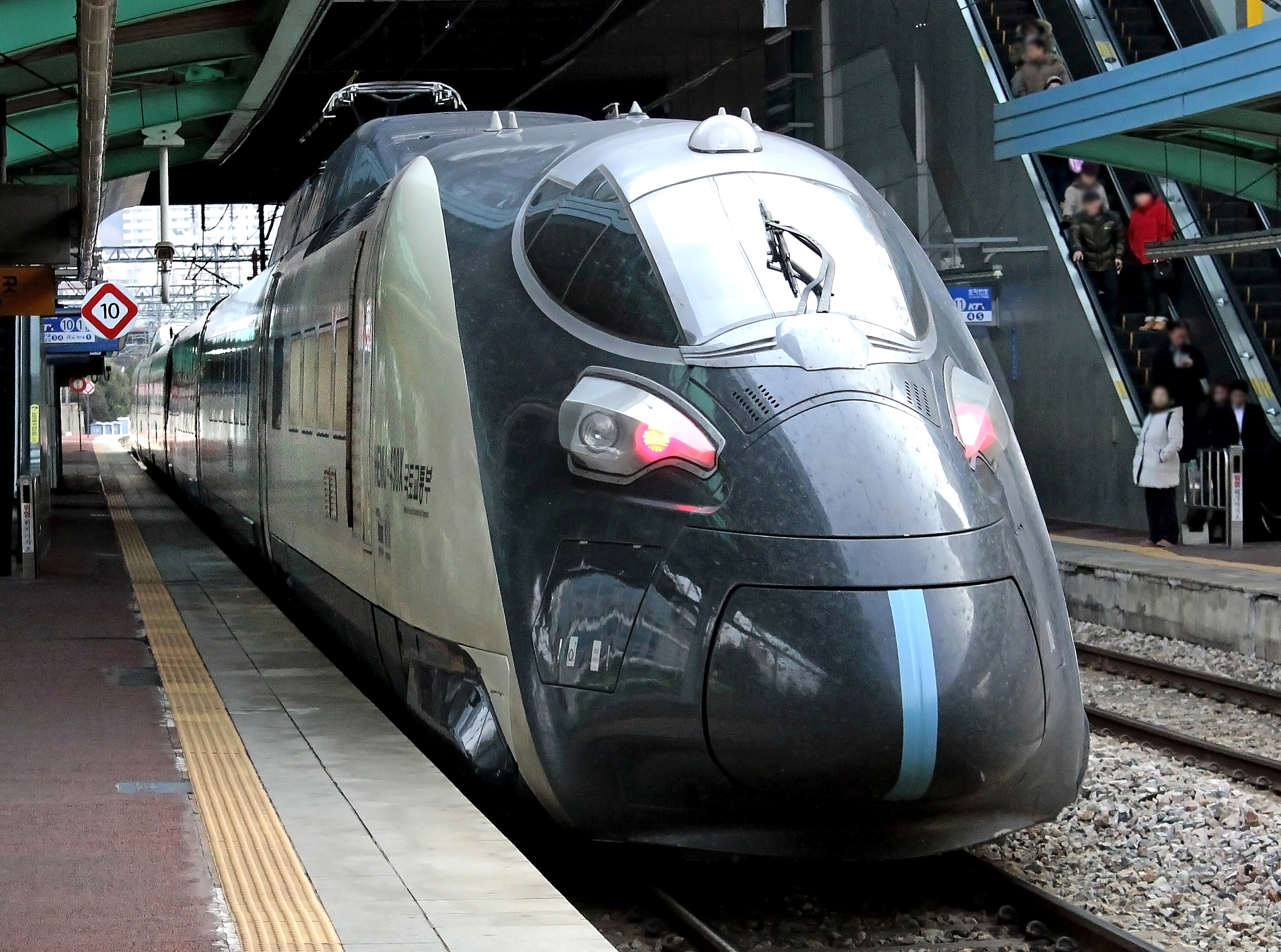
- HEMU-430X passing through Seodaejeon station.

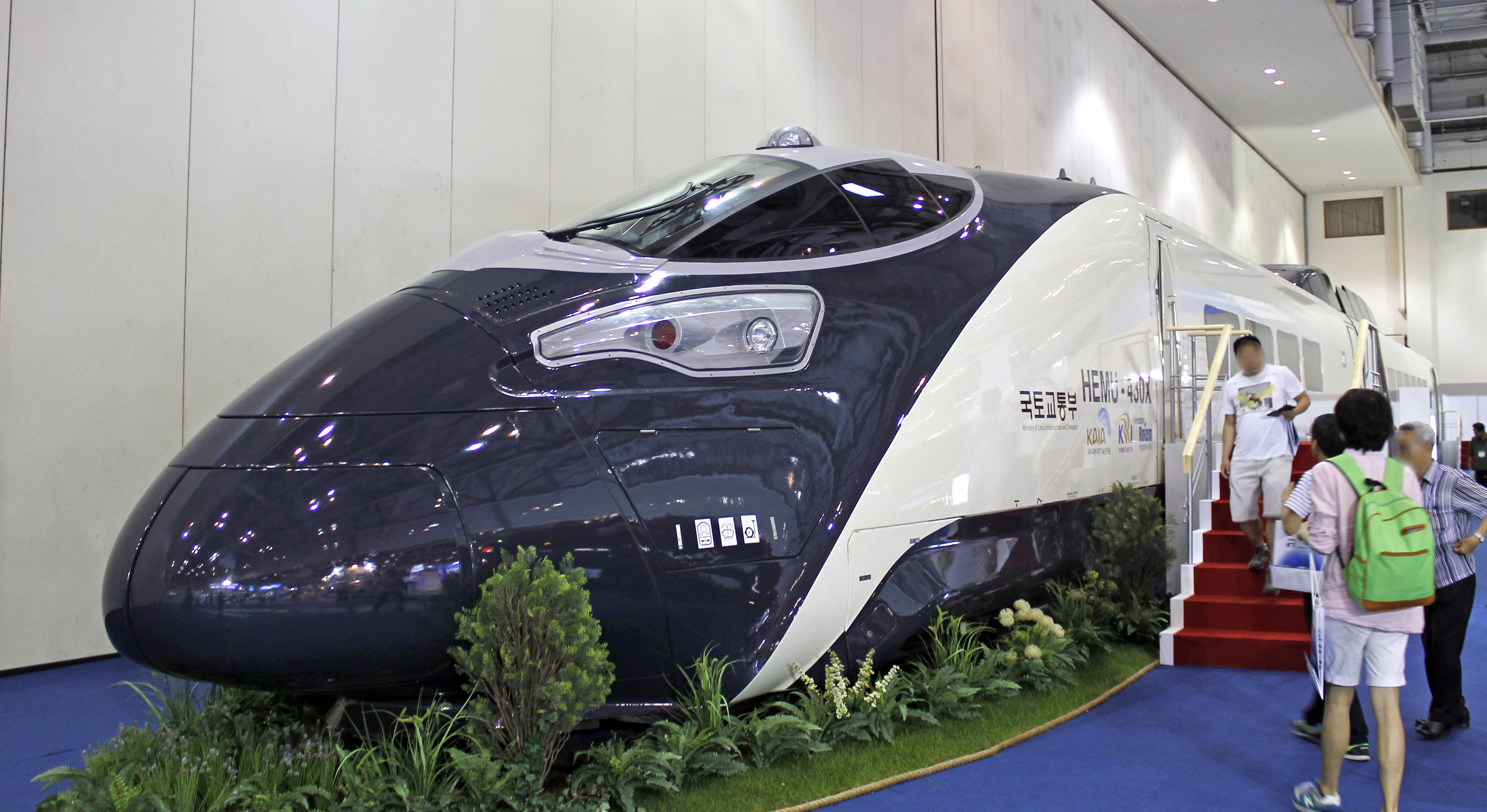
- HEMU-430X Mockup at Busan Logistics Fair 2013
- Manufacturer: Hyundai Rotem
- Family name: KTX
- Constructed: 2010–2011
- Number built: 1 set
- Number in service: 1 set (as a testing set of rail technologies such as KTCS)
- Formation: TC+4M+MC: TC: trailer car (unpowered driving trailer); M: motorized intermediate car; MC: motorized trailer car (powered driving trailer)
- Operators: KRRI, Korea National Railway
- Depot: Osong
- Lines served: Gyeongbu HSR; Honam HSR

Specifications
- Car body construction: Aluminium, composite
- Train length: 147.4 m (483 ft 7 1/8 in)
- Car length: End cars: 23.5 m (77 ft 1 3/16 in); Intermediate cars: 25.1 m (82 ft 4 3/16 in)
- Width: 3,100 mm (10 ft 2 1/16 in)
- Height: 3,720 mm (12 ft 2 7/16 in)
- Maximum speed: Planned in tests/design: 430 km/h (267 mph); Planned in service (KTX-III): 350–370 km/h (217–230 mph)
- Axle load: max. 14 t (15.4 short tons; 13.8 long tons)
- Traction system: 18 three-phase asynchronous induction motors and permanent magnet synchronous motors IGBT-based VVVF inverters
- Power output: 20 x 410 kW (550 hp) (8.2 MW or 11,000 hp)
- Acceleration: 0.5 m/s^{2} (1.8 km/(h⋅s)) up to 150 km/h (93 mph); 0 to...: 300 km/h (186 mph): 230 s and 11.67 km (7.25 mi); 0 to 350 km/h (0 to 217 mph) in 346 s and 22.27 km (13.84 mi); 0 to 400 km/h (0 to 249 mph) in 673 s and 56.98 km (35.41 mi)
- Electric system: 25 kV/60 Hz AC overhead line
- Current collection: Pantograph
- UIC classification: 2'2' + Bo'Bo' + Bo'Bo' + Bo'Bo' + Bo'Bo' + Bo'Bo'
- Braking systems: Eddy current, regenerative, rheostatic, disc
- Safety systems: TVM 430, ATP, ATC
- Multiple working: Yes
- Track gauge: 1,435 mm (4 ft 8 1/2 in) standard gauge

HEMU-430X (standing for High-Speed Electric Multiple Unit 430 km/h eXperimental) is a South Korean experimental high-speed train designed to achieve a maximum speed of 430 km/h (267 mph). On 31 March 2013, it achieved a record of 421.4 km/h (261.8 mph) during a test run, making South Korea the world's fourth country after France, Japan and China to develop a high-speed train that operates above 420 km/h (261 mph). The notable feature of this train compared to older South Korean high-speed trains is distributed traction. The commercial versions of these trains, known as KTX-Eum and KTX-Cheongryong, were delivered to Korail from 2020 onwards.

== History ==
The original 1991 plan for the Korea Train Express (KTX) high-speed rail system foresaw an operating speed of 350 km/h (217 mph), allowing for a travel time of under two hours between Seoul in the northwest and Busan in the southeast of South Korea, the termini of the first line. Later, the planned top speed was reduced to 300 km/h (186 mph), the maximum of existing high-speed trains on the market. Korail then ordered high-speed trains based on Alstom's TGV Réseau, the KTX-I, which started KTX service on 1 April 2004, and operates at a top speed increased slightly to 305 km/h (190 mph) in November 2007.

In 1996, the South Korean government directed research institutes and rail industry companies to fully localise high-speed rail technology. The know-how gained in the technology transfer for the KTX-I was used as the basis to develop the experimental train HSR-350x, which was to be tested at up to 385 km/h (239 mph) so that the commercial version could have a top speed of 350 km/h (217 mph). However, the maximum speed achieved in the HSR-350x tests was 352.4 km/h (219.0 mph) on 16 December 2004; and the design and top speeds of the commercial version, KTX-II (KTX-Sancheon), were aligned with those of the KTX-I.

The aim to develop commercial trains with a top speed of 350 km/h (217 mph) was taken up again in the project to build another experimental train, the HEMU-400X (High-speed Electric Multiple Unit - 400 km/h eXperiment), which was launched in July 2007. The six-year project was originally set to last until July 2013, and involved 100,000 km (62,000 mi) of test runs at speeds reaching 400 km/h (249 mph). The project is led by the Korean Railroad Research Institute (KRRI) and Hyundai Rotem, and with the involvement of the Korea Institute of Construction & Transportation Evaluation and Planning (KICTEP), 20 other companies, 13 universities, and one other organisation. The project budget was set at 97.11 billion won, with the government contributing 69.2 billion won.

Following a call by Nam-Hee Chae, the president of the Korea Railroad Research Institute, for proposals for a generic name for Korean-made high-speed trains, on 5 April 2007, Chae announced the name Hanvit (Hangul: 한빛), which means a streak of intense light in Korean. Under the new naming scheme, HEMU-400X is also called Hanvit 400.

The preliminary design was publicly presented in May 2009. A full-scale mock-up of an end car was first shown in June 2009 at the RailLog 2009 exhibition in Busan. Detailed designs were presented in October 2010 when the prototype was expected to be completed in 2011 and start line tests in 2012.

=== HEMU-430X prototype ===
A prototype named HEMU-430X was unveiled in May 2012. The unit is expected to undergo around 100,000 km of testing by 2015.

== Technical details ==
In contrast to the articulated passenger coaches between traction heads configuration of the KTX-I, HSR-350x and KTX-II trains, the 6-car HEMU-400X is fitted with distributed traction: traction equipment is underfloor, and all axles of all four intermediate cars are powered. The detailed plans released in October 2010 changed the trailing end driving trailer of the experimental train into a powered car, deviating from the planned commercial version. The new high-power configuration is to provide for higher acceleration: the 8-car commercial configuration was calculated to reach 300 km/h (186 mph) in less than four minutes and less than 12 kilometres (7.5 mi); the top test speed of 400 km/h (249 mph) is to be reached in 673 seconds and 56.98 kilometres (35.41 mi). Similar to JR East's Fastech 360 programme, the plan is to develop and test both asynchronous induction motors and permanent magnet synchronous motors in the train.

Research in the G7 programme showed that the bulk of the longitudinal aerodynamic resistance (drag) of the pantograph and the largest component of vertical aerodynamic forces (lift) acting on it derive from the contact shoe. For the HEMU-400X, researchers developed an aerodynamically optimised contact shoe cross section that reduced drag by about 40% and lift amplitude by about 25% in comparison to the contact shoe of the KTX-II pantographs.

The train is designed with active suspension for increased ride comfort. To save weight, in addition to aluminium, composite materials are to be used in the car body. The development of new transformers, batteries and several other electric system components also focuses on reducing weight and size. The train is also intended as a basis for Rotem to compete in high-speed train tenders abroad, and is designed to conform to European high-speed rail standards.

Nose styling was designed using a genetic algorithm, starting with the hybridization of the nose shapes of existing French TGV and German ICE high-speed trains. A double-deck configuration was also considered.

In the experimental train, the first two cars will test first-class seating, the fourth car will be fitted with a bar and special passenger compartments, and the fifth car will test standard-class seating. Data acquisition equipment for the onboard measurements is foreseen in the third and sixth cars.

== Commercial version (EMU-260/320) ==
EMU-260/320, formerly known as KTX-III, are the commercial derivatives of HEMU-430X. They were expected to enter service in late 2020 or early 2021. According to the initial information, in a normal 8-car, 197.6 m (648 ft) configuration, KTX-III would consist of two driving trailers at either end and six motorized intermediate cars giving 9.84 MW of power with an option of extension to 10 cars. The second, fourth and seventh cars will house transformers, each connected to inverter groups on the neighboring third, fifth, respective sixth cars. The end cars will house the batteries, while pantographs will be installed on the extreme intermediate cars.

The goal for maximum operating speed was originally 350 km/h (217 mph), which was expected to enable Seoul-Busan travel times of 1 hour 50 minutes. In plans released in October 2010, the planned service speed was raised to 370 km/h (230 mph). In the default configuration, the first two cars will be first class with 2+1 seating, the third car will house a bar and special passenger compartments with facing pairs of 3 or 2 seats, the fourth to eighth cars will be standard class with "3" seating, with foldable seats offering altogether 378 seats.

In September 2016, the designs of the EMU-260 and EMU-320 were decided, and it was known that the EMU-260 and EMU-320 would share the same design but with different patterns.

In May 2017, the mock-up and interior design of the EMU-260 and EMU-320 were released to the public, and public opinion on the mock-up and interior design was collected.

The first EMU-260 was released in November 2019 into trial operation. The EMU-260 was subsequently named the KTX-Eum, and it entered service on 4 January 2021.

The first EMU-320 was released in November 2023 into trial operation. The EMU-320 was subsequently named the KTX-Cheongryong, and it entered service on 1 May 2024.
