= KTX-Sancheon =

South Korean high-speed train

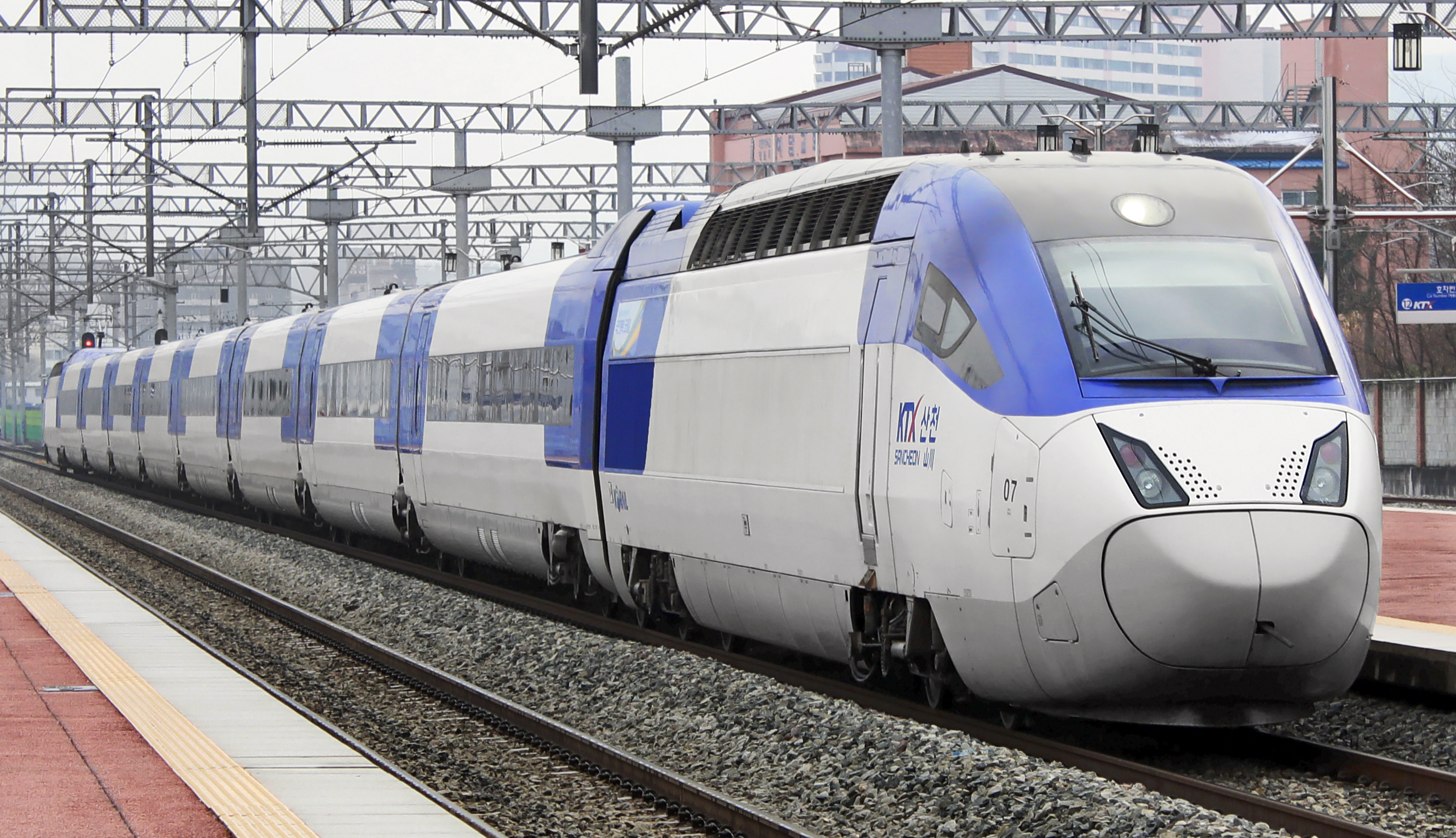
- Class 110000

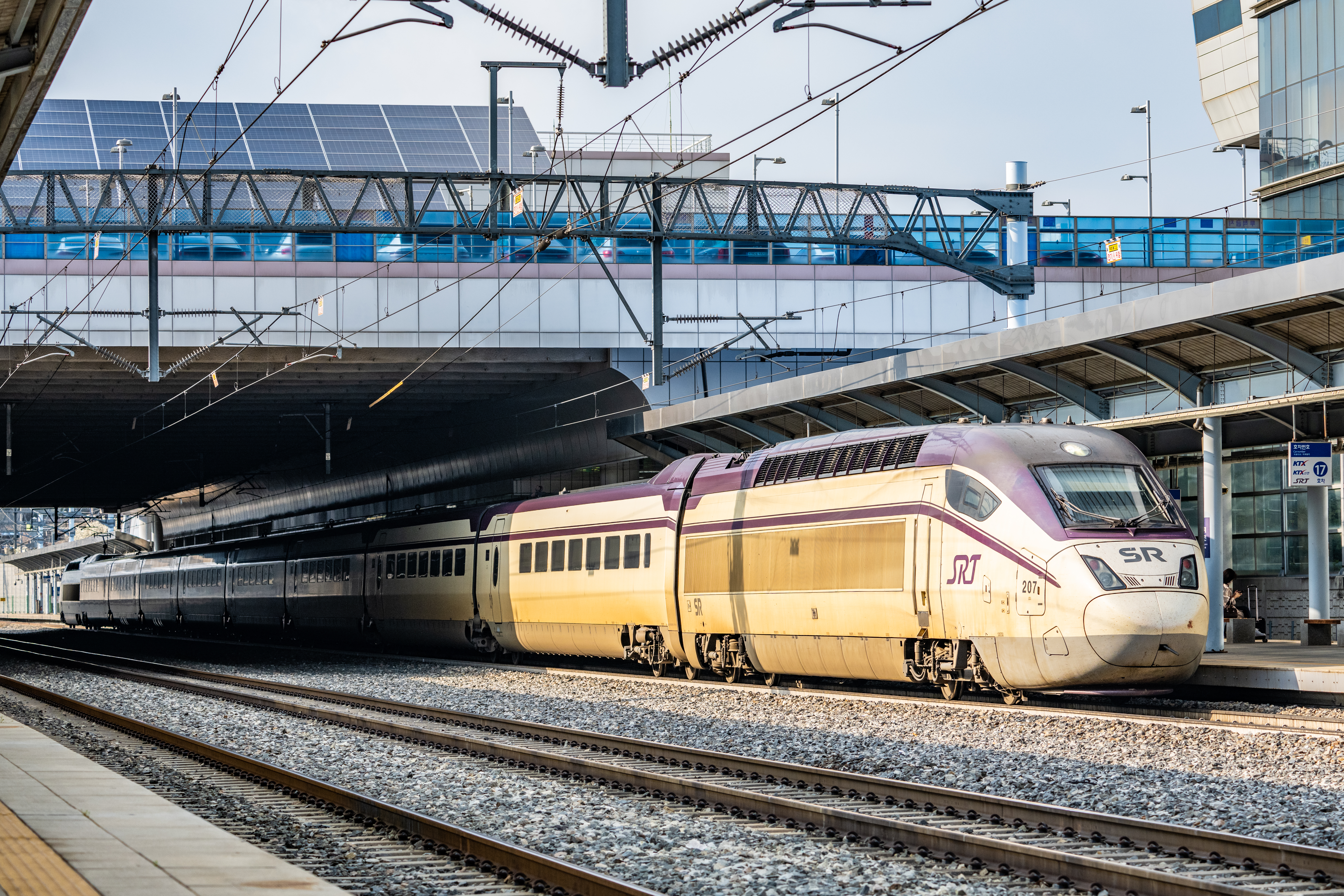
- Class 120000 on the former SRT service
- Manufacturer: Hyundai Rotem
- Designer: MBD Design
- Family name: KTX
- Constructed: 2008–2017
- Entered service: 2 March 2010
- Number built: 710 vehicles (71 sets)
- Number in service: 700 vehicles (70 sets)
- Number retired: 10 vehicles (1 set; set 408)
- Formation: 10 cars per trainset; (PC+8T+PC); PC: power car (traction head); T: trailer (passenger car)
- Fleet numbers: 101–124 (Class 110000); 201–222 (Class 120000); 301–310 (Class 130000); 401–415 (Class 140000)
- Capacity: 379 seated (Class 110000); 30 First Class (2+1); 349 Standard Class (2+2); 410 seated (Classes 120000, 130000, 140000); 33 First Class (2+1); 377 Standard Class (2+2)
- Operator: Korail
- Depots: Goyang, Osong
- Lines served: Gyeongbu HSR; Honam HSR; Suseo–Pyeongtaek HSR; Gyeongbu Line; Honam Line; Gyeongjeon Line; Jeolla Line; Donghae Line; AREX (until 2018); Gangneung Line (until 2021)

Specifications
- Car body construction: Traction heads: Steel; Passenger cars: Aluminium
- Train length: 201 m (659 ft 5 in)
- Car length: Traction heads: 22.7 m (74 ft 5.7 in); End passenger cars: 21.8 m (71 ft 6.3 in); Intermediate passenger cars: 18.7 m (61 ft 4.2 in)
- Width: Traction heads: 2.814 m (9 ft 2.8 in); Passenger cars: 2.97 m (9 ft 8.9 in)
- Height: Traction heads: 4.062 m (13 ft 3.9 in); End passenger cars: 4.092 m (13 ft 5.1 in); Intermediate passenger cars: 3.75 m (12 ft 3.6 in)
- Floor height: 1,125 mm (44.3 in)
- Maximum speed: Service: 305 km/h (190 mph); Design: 330 km/h (205 mph)
- Weight: Empty: 403 t (397 long tons; 444 short tons) (Class 110000); 406 t (400 long tons; 448 short tons) (Classes 120000, 130000, 140000); Loaded: 434 t (427 long tons; 478 short tons) (Class 110000); 441 t (434 long tons; 486 short tons) (Classes 120000, 130000, 140000)
- Axle load: max. 17 t (17 long tons; 19 short tons)
- Traction system: 8 three-phase asynchronous induction motors 4 IGBT-based VVVF inverters
- Power output: 8 x 1,100 kW (1,500 hp) (8.8 MW or 11,800 hp)
- Tractive effort: 210 kN (47,000 lb_{f})
- Gearbox: Voith SE-530 and SE-340
- Acceleration: 0.45 m/s^{2} (1.6 km/(h⋅s)) up to 60 km/h (37 mph); from 0 to 300 km/h (0 to 186 mph) in 316 s and 16.4 km (10.2 mi)
- Deceleration: 1.06 m/s^{2} (3.8 km/(h⋅s)) (+5% -0% tolerance); from 300 to 0 km/h (186 to 0 mph) in 3.3 km (2.1 mi)
- Auxiliaries: 2 x 1.0 MW (1,341 hp), supplying 670 V DC; IGBT-based
- Power supply: catenary
- Electric system: 25 kV/60 Hz AC
- Current collection: pantograph (type: single-arm, SSS400+)
- UIC classification: Bo'Bo' + 2'(2)(2)(2)(2)(2)(2)(2)2' + Bo'Bo'
- Braking systems: Electronically controlled pneumatic brakes (Regenerative, rheostatic, disc, pneumatic)
- Safety systems: ATS, ATP (Ansaldo), ATC (TVM-430)
- Coupling system: Scharfenberg
- Multiple working: Up to two trainsets (three on maintenance)
- Track gauge: 1,435 mm (4 ft 8 1/2 in) standard gauge

The KTX-Sancheon (Korean: KTX-산천; Hanja: KTX-山川, formerly called the KTX-II) is a South Korean high-speed train built by Hyundai Rotem and operated by Korail. With the maximum operational speed of 305 km/h (190 mph), the KTX-Sancheon is the second commercial high-speed train operated in South Korea, as well as the country's first domestically developed high-speed train in commercial service.

The KTX-Sancheon can be divided into four classes: 110000, 120000, 130000 and 140000. Classes 120000 and 130000 were previously operated by SR Corporation as SRT trains from December 2016 until the KTX–SRT merger in September 2026.

== History ==
When South Korea started its high-speed rail project, rolling stock and infrastructure was built in the framework of a technology transfer agreement between GEC-Alsthom (today Alstom), the main maker of French TGV high-speed trains, and South Korean companies. Thus Korea Train Express (KTX) began operating with KTX-I trains, which were derived from the TGV Réseau, and built both by Alstom and Rotem. The technology transfer agreement did not provide for a complete control of manufacturing processes, and construction involved the import of parts. To increase the domestic added value, in 1996, an alliance of South Korean government research agencies, universities, and private companies started a project called G7 to develop domestic high-speed rail technology.

The main element of the G7 project was the 7-car experimental high-speed train HSR-350x, originally intended as the prototype of a train with 20-car and 11-car versions for 350 km/h (217.5 mph) commercial service. The experimental train was used for trials from 2002, and achieved the South Korean rail speed record of 352.4 km/h (219.0 mph) on December 16, 2004.

Already before HSR-350x was finished, in 2001, a study focusing on the needs of the less frequented Honam Line proposed a modified, modular train that allows shorter configurations by removing traction equipment from the intermediate cars next to the traction heads, while reducing top speed to 300 km/h (186.4 mph). Possible configurations would have been 12-car, 10-car, and 8-car versions with two traction heads and 8-car, 6-car versions with one traction head and a driving trailer. The versions with two traction heads would have offered 500, 384 and 268 seats respectively. The active passenger compartment pressure control system of the HSR-350x wasn't deemed necessary for the proposed Honam high-speed train, only pressure isolation as in the KTX-I.

The view that shorter trains have to be added to the KTX rolling stock for operational flexibility was reinforced by the actual Honam KTX seat occupation trends after the launch of KTX services on April 1, 2004, with the 20-car KTX-I trains. In July 2005, the Ministry of Construction and Transportation earmarked ₩80 billion for two 10-car commercial trains for 300 km/h (186.4 mph), destined for planned KTX services on the Jeolla Line from 2008. In October 2005, however, Korail called competitive bids. Rotem, offering a commercial version of the HSR-350x, was chosen over Alstom as preferred bidder for the ₩300 billion order in December 2005. The order for 10 trains for a price equal to $306 million was placed on June 6, 2006. Six of the trainsets were intended for the Honam KTX service from June 2009, four for the Jeolla KTX service from June 2010. A second batch of nine sets was ordered in December 2007, intended for Gyeongjeon KTX services between Seoul and Masan, to be delivered by December 2010. A third batch of five sets was ordered on December 9, 2008; for delivery by December 2011, intended to strengthen Gyeongbu KTX services.

A mock-up showing the exterior and interior design of two passenger cars was shown at exhibitions in 2007, with one of the mock-up cars built as a driving trailer to also display the nose design of the traction heads of the actual train. On November 25, 2008, the first KTX-II set was revealed to the public in a roll-out ceremony at the Hyundai Rotem factory in Changwon.

Hyundai Rotem also offered the KTX-II in the competition to supply rolling stock for Brazil's Rio–São Paulo project.

== Technical details ==
Like the HSR-350x, the KTX-II consists of two traction heads, that is the power cars at both ends, and an articulated set of trailers for passengers in-between; but the number of intermediate cars is eight (in comparison to the predecessor's 18 cars), and no intermediate car is powered. Two sets can be coupled together with automatic couplers of the Scharfenberg type. The couplers and the surrounding structure form an integral unit, the so-called front ends, which were supplied by German industrial company Voith. The vehicles received a new exterior front shape, designed by French design studio MBD Design. The aerodynamic shape was inspired by the cherry salmon, an indigenous fish.

Like for the HSR-350x, the carbody of intermediate cars is made of aluminum. Unlike the HSR-350x, the vehicle lacks bogie shrouding. Compared to the KTX-I, window thickness was increased from 29 to 38 mm (1.14 to 1.50 in) by adding a fourth layer, to improve sound insulation and pressurization. The total width of passenger cars was increased from 2,904 to 2,970 mm (9 ft 6.3 in to 9 ft 8.9 in).

The KTX-II's traction motors, converters, traction control and braking system are domestic developments resulting from the HSR-350x programme. The traction motors are asynchronous induction motors like those of the HSR-350x, rather than synchronous motors as on the KTX-I. Final drive gearboxes were supplied by Voith. The power electronics in the converters use newly available IGBTs, supplied by American semiconductor manufacturer IXYS Corporation, rather than the originally foreseen but unreliable IGCTs of the HSR-350x. Each traction converter consists of two parallel-switched four-quadrant converters, which function as rectifier modules by converting single-phase alternating current (AC) from one main transformer winding each to direct current (DC), a 2,800 V DC intermediate circuit, and one inverter module converting the DC supply to the three-phase AC supply for traction motors. Each converter supplies the motors on two axles of a bogie, providing for individual bogie control. All auxiliary power is supplied by separate 1 MW auxiliary units, one per traction head, consisting of two pairs of parallel-switched IGBT-based converter modules acting as rectifiers between one main transformer winding and the 670 V DC head end power. The VVVF inverters for the motor and converter cooling fans and the air compressor, the constant voltage constant frequency (CVCF) inverters for the cab air-conditioning, the battery charge, the on-board AC supply and the oil pumps are connected to the head end power within the auxiliary unit. The pantograph, supplied by Austrian company Melecs MWW, is a standard type certified for 350 km/h (217 mph) and also used on Deutsche Bahn's ICE S experimental and test train, the Siemens Velaro high-speed train family, and the China Railways CRH2. The pantographs were eventually replaced with Faiveley CX-NG, another standard high speed pantograph used in many railway systems.

The train can accelerate from 0 to 300 km/h (0.0 to 186.4 mph) in 316 seconds, in contrast to 365 seconds for the KTX-I. Design speed is 330 km/h (205.1 mph), and revenue service speed is 305 km/h (189.5 mph), similar to the KTX-I. Braking distance from 300 km/h (186.4 mph) is 3,300 m (10,827 ft).

The third intermediate car offers elevated comfort First Class seating, the others Standard Class. Swivelling seats, which can be rotated around at terminal stations so that they always face in the direction of travel, are installed in both classes, rather than only in First Class as on the KTX-I. Compared to the KTX-I, seat distance was increased from 930 to 980 mm (36.61 to 38.58 in) to provide more leg room. The fourth passenger car houses a snack bar and family compartments with separated facing seats. Other passenger comfort features include wireless internet access and digital multimedia broadcasts, and business compartments with small tables. Like on the KTX-I, all passenger compartments are equipped with ceiling-mounted video displays, but 19-inch (483 mm) LCD screens are used instead of 17-inch (432 mm) ones. Unlike those of the KTX-I, the KTX-II passenger compartments were fitted with fire detectors. Toilet doors were automatised, and the toilet in the first passenger car is suited for disabled persons.

In addition to Automatic Train Control (ATC) for high-speed lines and traditional Automatic train stop (ATS) for conventional lines, the trains were among the first to be equipped with the new domestically developed ATP automatic train protection system. The ERTMS-compatible system is meant as an improvement over ATS on conventional lines, and makes shorter braking distances possible by allowing braking from full speed to stop in one step.

Domestic added value was increased from 58% for the KTX-I to 87%. According to the Korea Railroad Research Institute, the purchase of KTX-II trains was calculated to save 840 billion won compared to a forecast spending of 7,500 billion won until 2020 if high-speed trains had been imported.

== Operation ==
Following testing, the KTX-II carried its first passengers in a preview run on February 11, 2010. After a naming competition held in the next ten days, the KTX-II was officially renamed as KTX-Sancheon (KTX 산천). Sancheon comes from sancheoneo (산천어), the Korean word for cherry salmon (Oncorhynchus masou masou).

Commercial KTX-Sancheon service started on March 2, 2010. In contrast to the original plans, the first trains are used both in Honam and Gyeongbu KTX service. Korail started to operate its first pair of non-stop services on the Seoul–Busan relation on December 1, 2010, using KTX-Sancheon trains. Gyeongjeon KTX service to Masan started on December 15, 2010.

Until December 2010, KTX-Sancheon trains broke down 15 times, with most incidents related to the signal device. Domestic observers expressed fear that the news of the breakdowns will negatively impact Rotem's chances in the competition to supply the Rio–São Paulo project or the US state of California's CHSR project, while Korail argued that the publication of start-up glitches is a result of its policy to make all information public, contrasting it with Chinese makers.

On February 11, 2011, a KTX-Sancheon train bound for Seoul from Busan derailed on a switch in a tunnel 500 m (1,640 ft 5 in) before Gwangmyeong Station, when travelling at around 90 km/h (55.9 mph). Only one passenger suffered slight injury. Preliminary investigation found no problems with the train, but indicated that the accident was caused by human errors by maintenance workers. At the time, three cars of the train were reserved for the President of South Korea, Lee Myung-bak's, entourage, but he was not on board at the time of the accident.

Class 120000 train sets were on loan to SR for SRT services between Suseo and Busan/Mokpo.

== Gallery ==
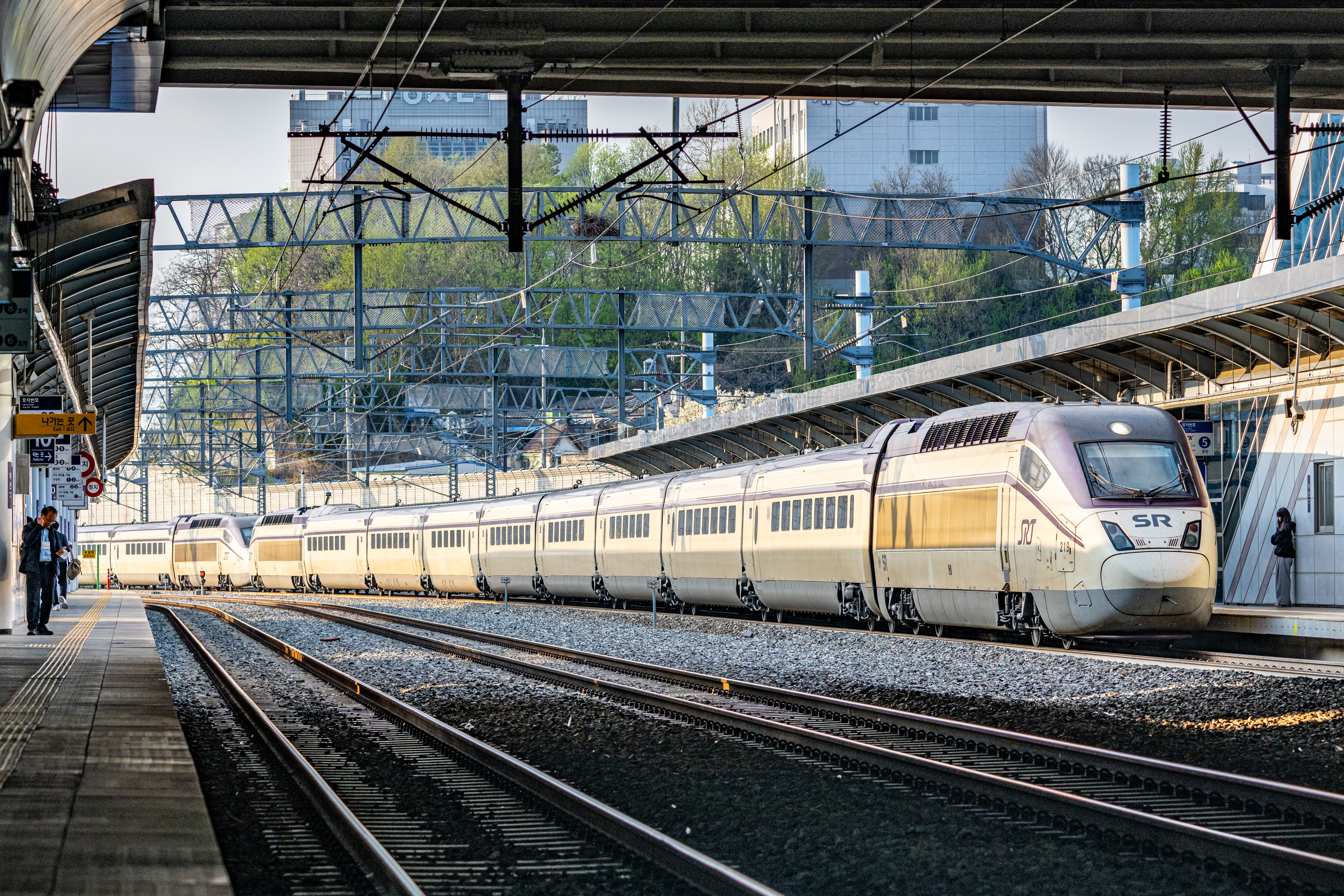
Double-cross operation

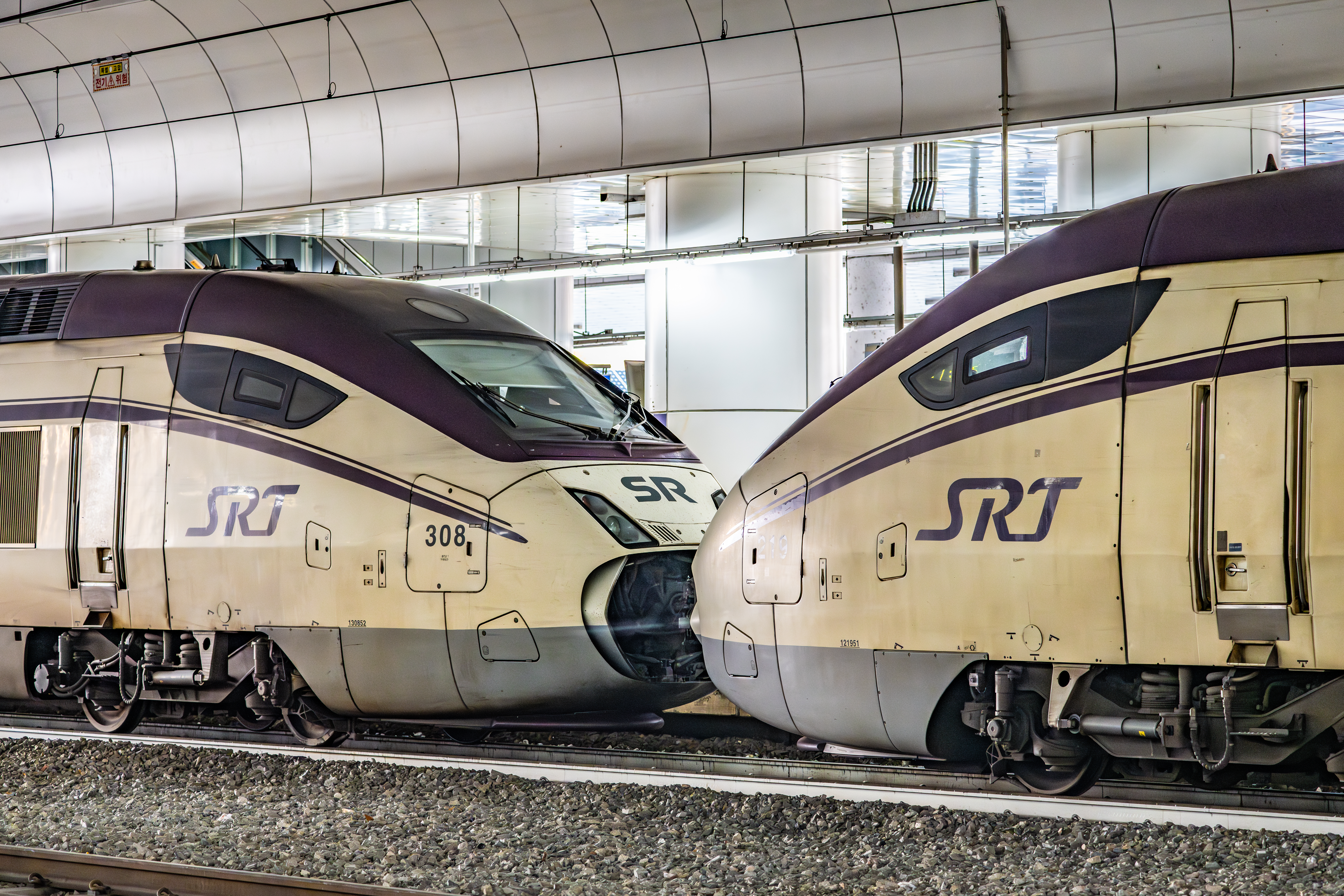
Double-cross operation (close-up)

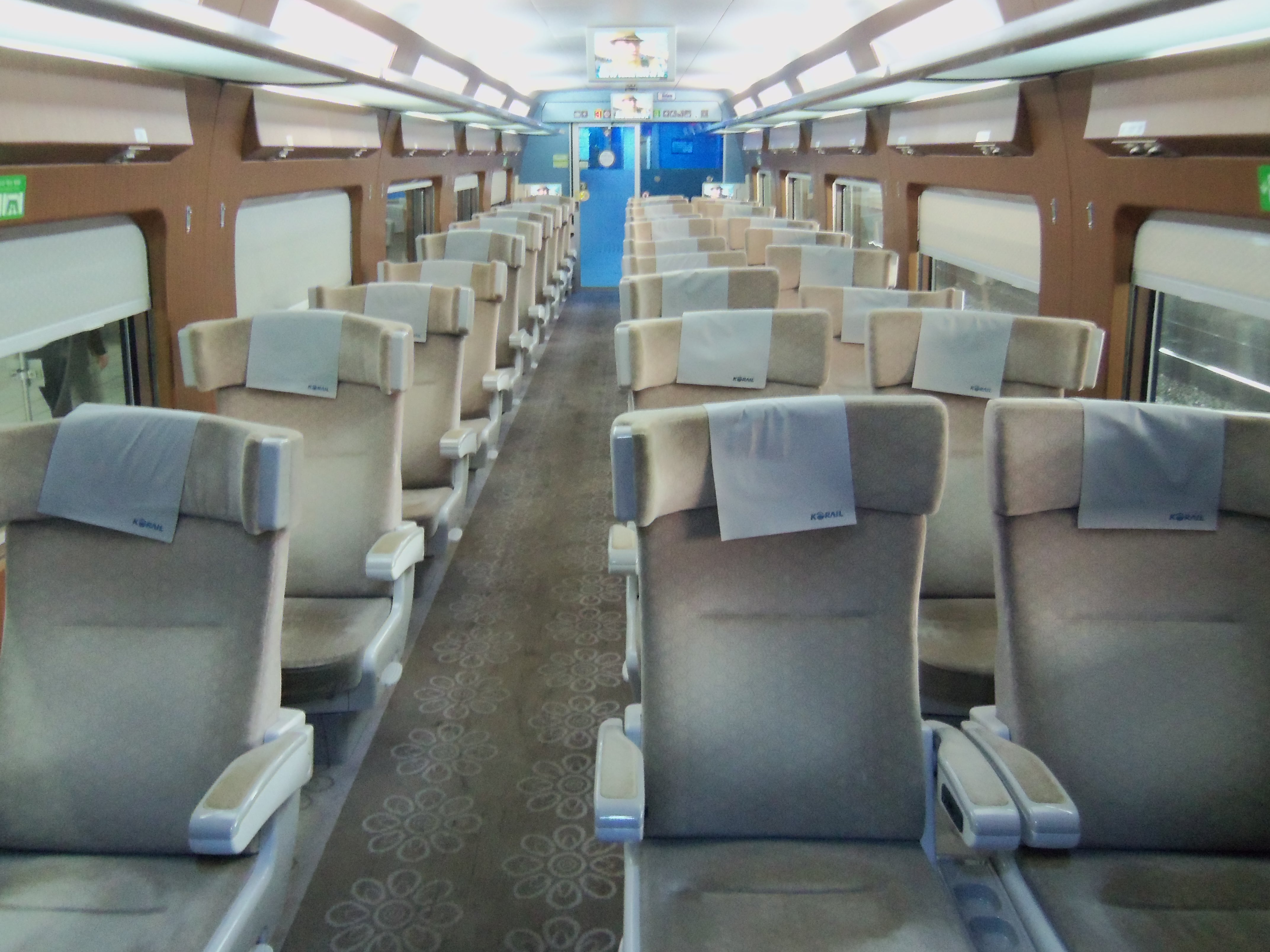
First class interior (Car 3) of class 110000

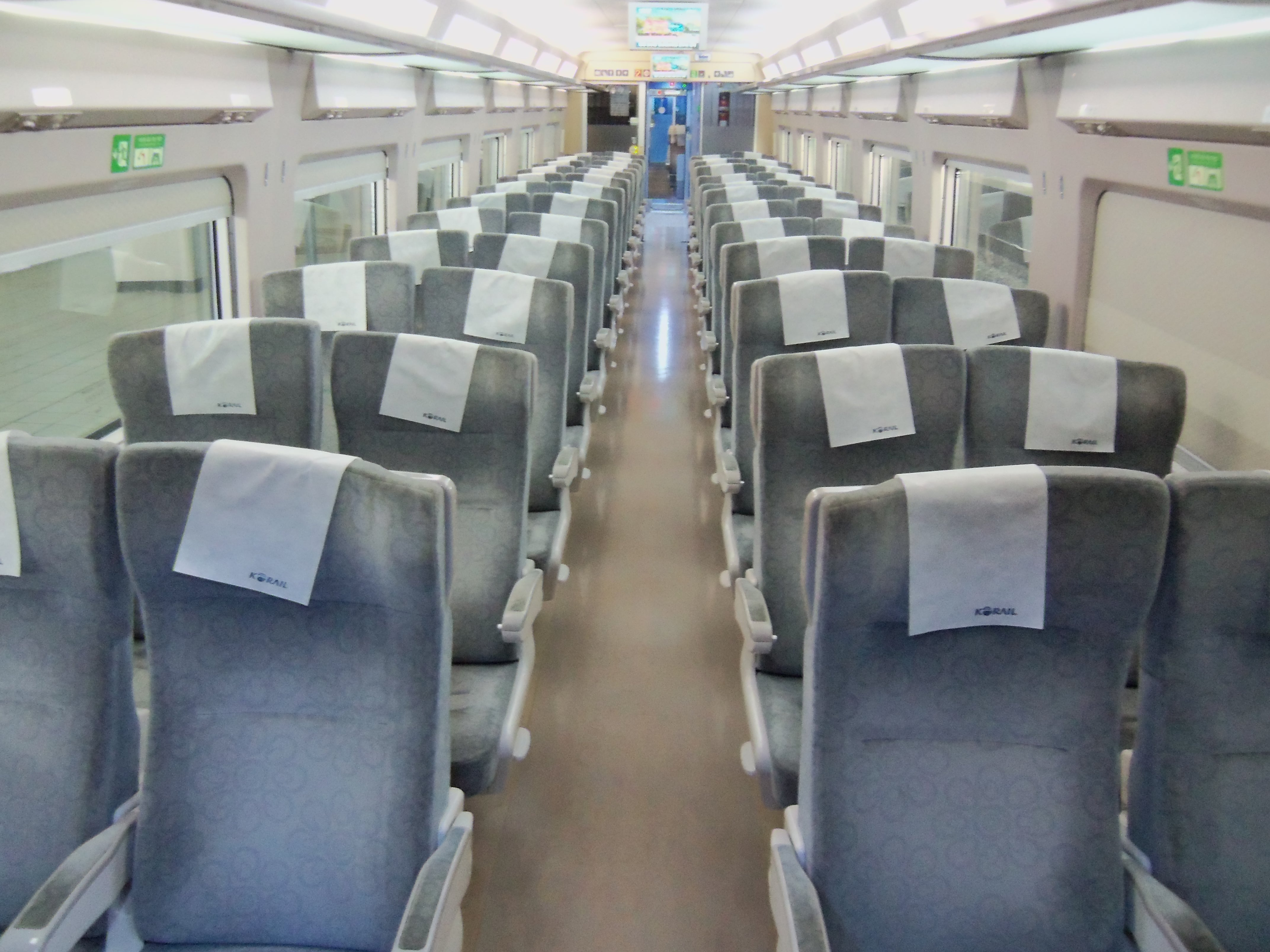
Standard class interior of class 110000

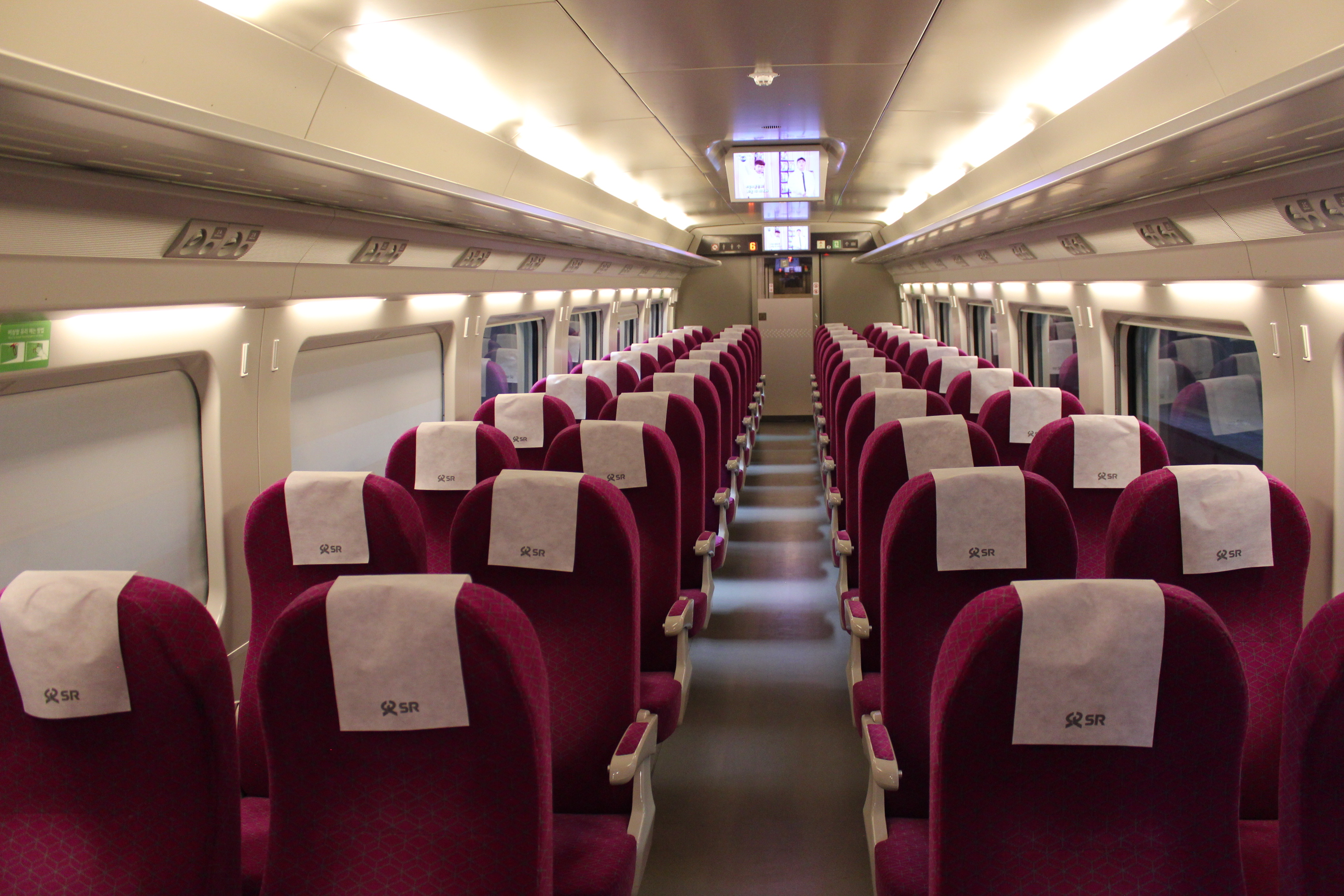
Standard class interior (Cars 1-2, 5-8) of SRT class 130000

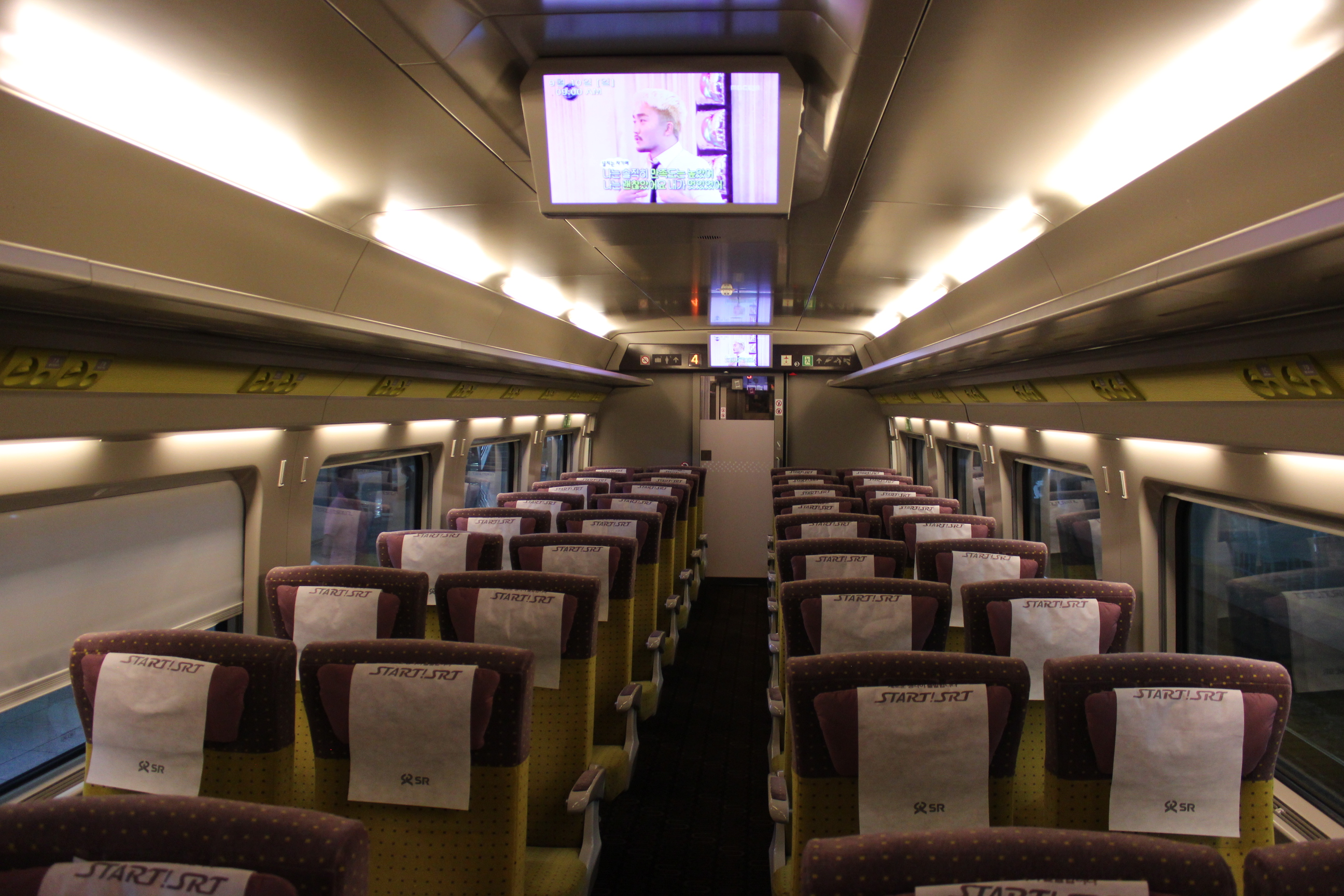
Standard class interior (Car 4) of SRT class 130000

== See also ==
- List of high speed trains
- HEMU-430X
- Rail transport in South Korea
- Tilting Train Express
- Mugunghwa-ho
- SNCF TGV Thalys PBKA
- SNCF TGV POS
