= KTX-I =

South Korean high-speed train

KTX-I (한국고속철도)
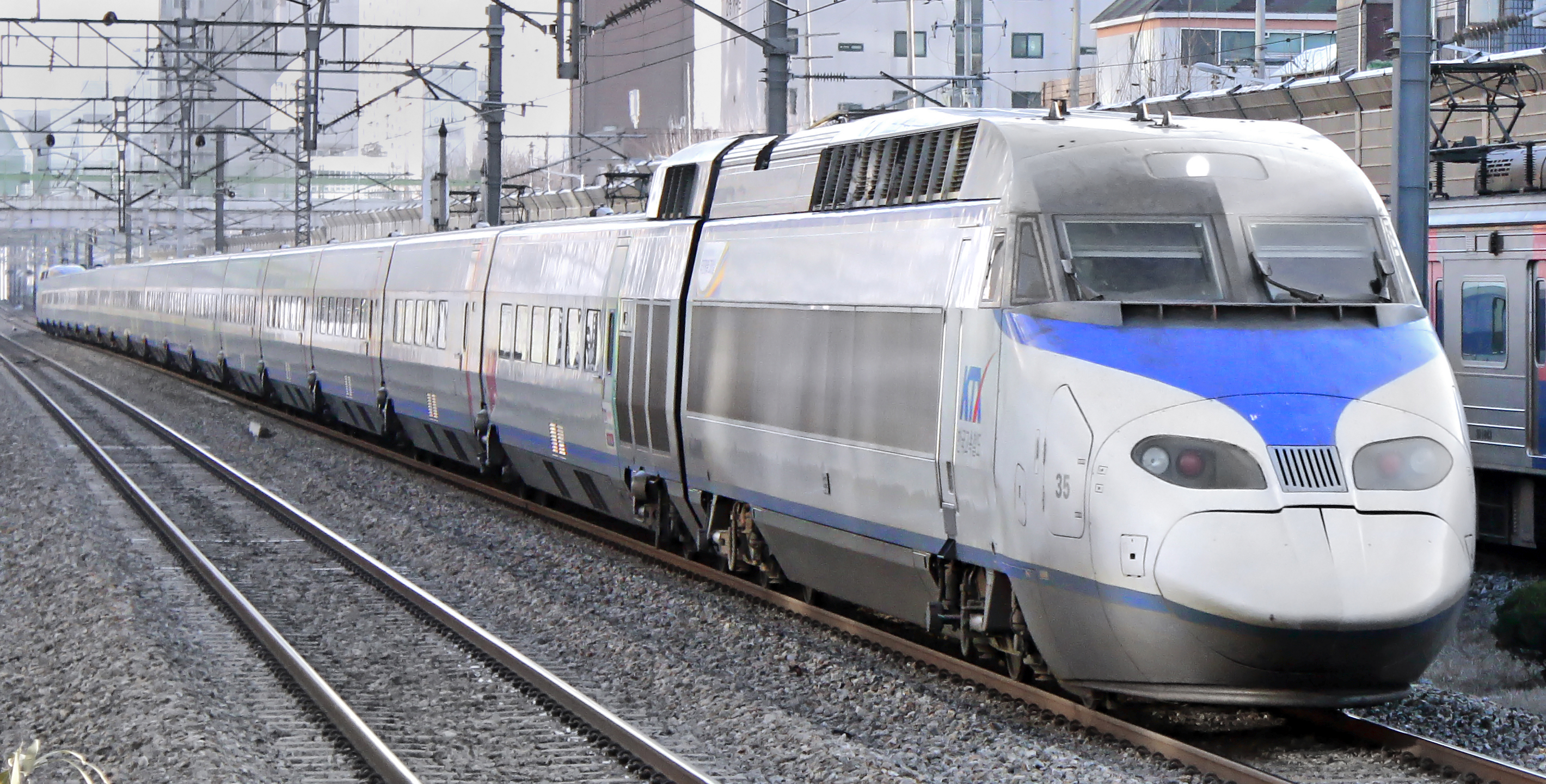
- KTX-I trainset 035, December 2014

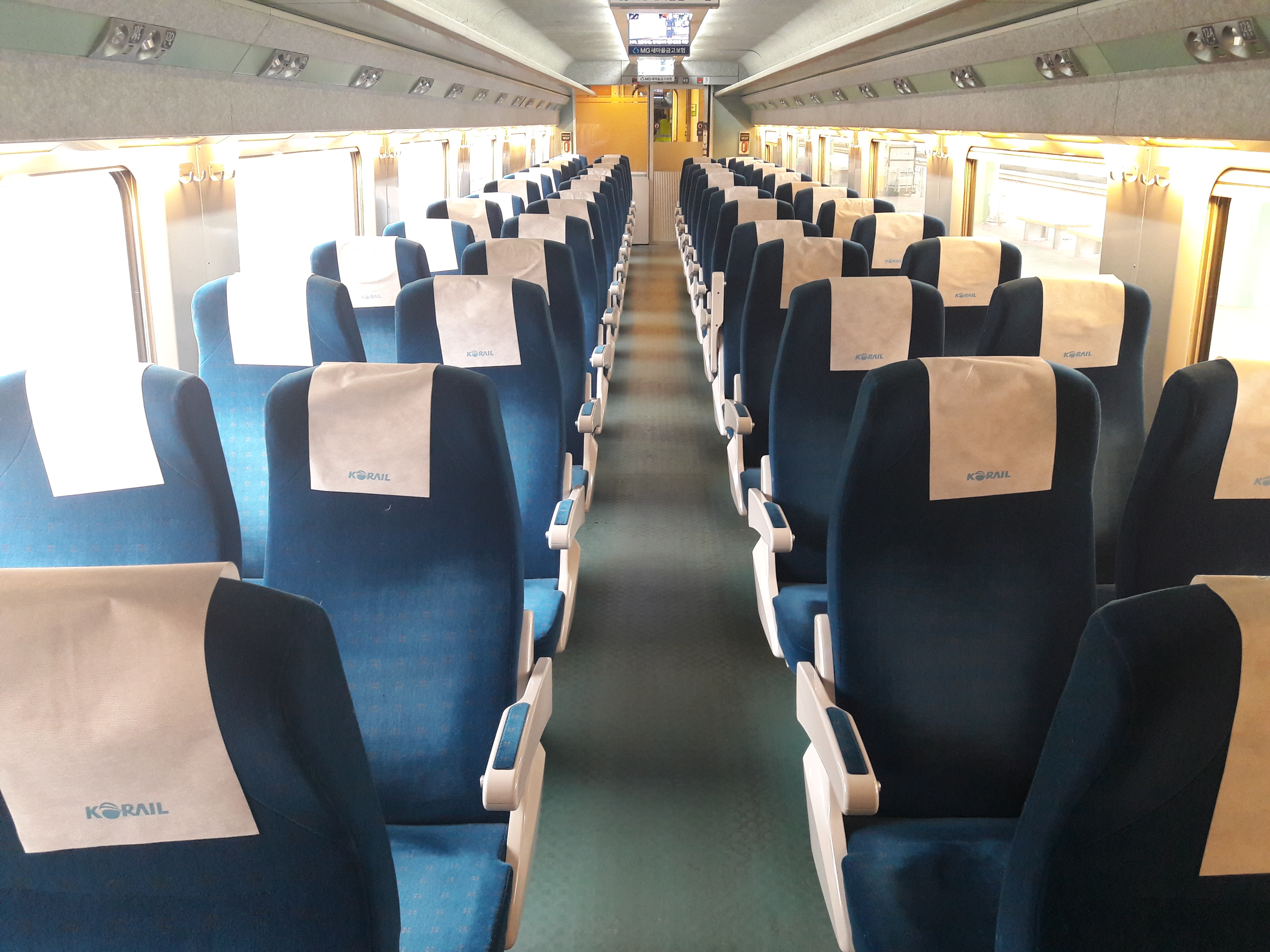
- Refurbished standard class interior
- Manufacturers: Alstom (trainsets 01–12); Rotem (trainsets 13–46)
- Family name: TGV
- Constructed: 1997–2000 (trainsets 01–12); 2002–2003 (trainsets 13–46)
- Entered service: 1 April 2004
- Number built: 920 vehicles (46 sets)
- Number in service: 920 vehicles (46 sets)
- Formation: 20 cars per trainset; (PC+MT+16IT+MT+PC); PC: power car (traction head); MT: motorized trailer (passenger car with one powered bogie); IT: intermediate trailer (passenger car)
- Fleet numbers: 001–046
- Capacity: 955 seated + 30 jump seats: 92 First Class (2+1); 863 Standard Class (2+2)
- Operator: Korail
- Depot: Goyang
- Lines served: Gyeongbu HSR; Honam HSR; Suseo–Pyeongtaek HSR; Gyeongbu Line; Honam Line; Gyeongjeon Line; Jeolla Line; Donghae Line; AREX (until 2018)

Specifications
- Car body construction: Steel
- Train length: 388.1 m (1,273 ft 3 1/2 in)
- Car length: Traction heads: 22,607 mm (74 ft 2 1/16 in); Powered passenger cars: 21,845 mm (71 ft 8 1/16 in); Unpowered passenger cars: 18.7 m (61 ft 4 1/4 in)
- Width: Traction heads: 2.814 m (9 ft 2 13/16 in); Passenger cars: 2.904 m (9 ft 6 5/16 in)
- Height: Traction heads: 4.062 m (13 ft 3 15/16 in); Powered passenger cars: 4.1 m (13 ft 5 7/16 in); Unpowered passenger cars: 3.484 m (11 ft 5 3/16 in)
- Doors: Height: 1,835 mm (6 ft 1/4 in); Width: 700 mm (27 9/16 in)
- Maximum speed: Service: 305 km/h (190 mph); (orig. 300 km/h (186 mph)); Design: 330 km/h (205 mph)
- Weight: Empty: 701 t (690 long tons; 773 short tons); Max load: 771 t (759 long tons; 850 short tons)
- Axle load: max. 17 t (16.7 long tons; 18.7 short tons)
- Traction system: Thyristor current source inverter
- Traction motors: 12 × SM47 1,130 kW (1,520 hp) 3-phase AC self-commuting synchronous motor
- Power output: 13.56 MW (18,180 hp)
- Tractive effort: 385 kN (87,000 lb_{f})
- Acceleration: 0.47 m/s^{2} (1.7 km/(h⋅s)) up to 60 km/h (37 mph); from 0 to 300 km/h (0 to 186 mph) in 365 seconds and 20 km (12 mi)
- Deceleration: 1.04 m/s^{2} (3.4 ft/s^{2}); from 300 to 0 km/h (186 to 0 mph) in 74 seconds and 3.3 km (2.1 mi)
- Auxiliaries: GTO
- Electric system: 25 kV 60 Hz AC (nominal) from overhead catenary
- Current collection: Faiveley GPU-25K single-arm pantograph
- UIC classification: Bo′Bo′+Bo′(2)′(2)′(2)′(2)′(2)′(2)′(2)′(2)′ (2)′(2)′(2)′(2)′(2)′(2)′(2)′(2)′(2)′Bo′+Bo′Bo′
- Bogies: Jacobs bogies between intermediate cars
- Braking systems: Regenerative, rheostatic (power system); Wheel tread (powered axles); Disc (unpowered axles)
- Safety systems: ATS, ATP (Bombardier), ATC (TVM-430)
- Coupling system: Scharfenberg (emergency)
- Track gauge: 1,435 mm (4 ft 8 1/2 in) standard gauge

The KTX-I, also known as the TGV-K or Korail Class 100000, is a South Korean high speed train class based on the French TGV Réseau. The 20-car formation of the trainsets without a restaurant car is optimized for high capacity. The 46 trainsets were built partly in France and partly in South Korea in the framework of a technology transfer agreement, which was the basis for further domestic high-speed train development in South Korea.

Korail uses the name of KTX as the official name of KTX-I. The name of KTX-I is derived to distinguish KTX-Sancheon, which was formerly called as KTX-II, but it is not the official name for this rolling stock.

The high-speed rail service of South Korea's national rail carrier Korail, Korea Train Express (KTX), started with the KTX-I. The operational reliability of the trains was improved over time with better maintenance and minor modifications. As of 2011, the KTX-I remains Korail's main workhorse in KTX service with a maximum scheduled speed of 305 km/h (190 mph).

== History ==
In 1991, bids were called for the supply and technology transfer of the core system technology, encompassing the catenary, signalling and rolling stock, for a South Korean high speed train service. On August 26, 1991, three competitors submitted initial bids: consortia led by GEC-Alstom (today Alstom), one of the builders of France's TGV/LGV system; Siemens, one of the builders of Germany's ICE; and Mitsubishi, one of the builders of Japan's Shinkansen. After five rounds of evaluation, the French and German consortia submitted final bids on June 15, 1993. The Korea High Speed Rail Construction Authority (KHSRCA) announced that the GEC-Alstom-led consortium was the preferred bidder on August 20, 1993, and the contract was signed on June 14, 1994.

Part of the core system contract won by GEC-Alstom and its South Korean subsidiary Eukorail were the first high-speed trains in South Korea, the KTX-I, which were based on the TGV Réseau. The carbody of the first end car was manufactured in January 1996, the first full train was completed and began testing in France in December 1997, and was shipped to South Korea in March 1998. The first test run in South Korea took place in December 1999. In June 2000, the speed of 300 km/h (186 mph) had been achieved, regular testing at that speed started in November 2000, after all of the 12 sets built by Alstom in France have been delivered to South Korea. In line with the core system contract condition that over 50% of the added value has to come from South Korea after technology transfer, the remaining 34 of the 46 trainsets ordered were built under license by Rotem in South Korea itself. The first carbody manufactured in Korea was completed in October 1999, the first complete train was rolled out in April 2002, and all trains were delivered by December 2003.

From the beginning of January 2004 until the start of regular service on April 1, 2004, 25–28 of the trains were in operation each day when the KTX system was put under intensive test operation to prepare all system components and personnel for regular service.

== Technical details ==
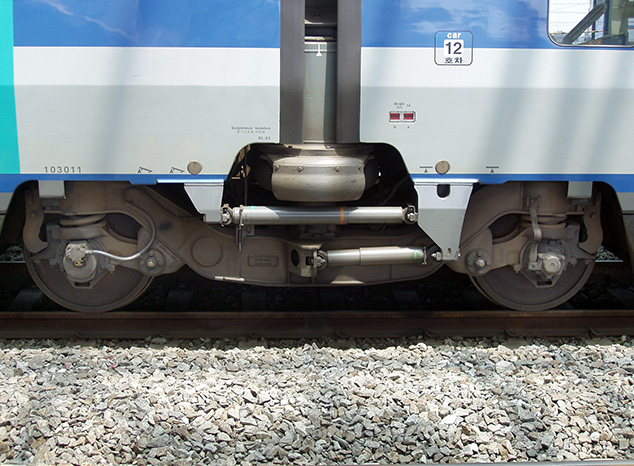
Jacobs bogie of a KTX-I train. The two trailers rest on the large air spring of the secondary suspension (partially covered by the mud flaps), below it the inter-trailer and the bogie-trailer yaw dampers.

Like all TGV variants, the KTX-I is a permanently coupled trainset that consists of two traction heads, that is powered end cars carrying no passengers, flanking a fixed set of passenger cars or trailers that are articulated with Jacobs bogies between them. Though the KTX-I is based on the TGV Réseau, it has 18 instead of 8 passenger cars, making them the longest member of the TGV family with a monobloc configuration, that is a single set of articulated cars. The two normal (non-Jacobs) bogies next to the traction heads under the two extreme passenger cars are motorised, like on the TGV Sud-Est. Further traits differentiating the KTX-I from all European variants are the supply voltage frequency of 60 Hz (instead of 50 Hz), rotating seats in the First Class sections, the lack of any bar or restaurant cars. Original plans in 1993 proposed a new "shovel nose" design, with the underside of the nose closer to the track, for better aerodynamics in tunnels; however, the final design was only a slightly modified version of another TGV export version, the AVE Class 100 for Spain.

The trains are pressure-sealed to reduce passenger discomfort from pressure variations during tunnel passages. Windows are triple-glazed, with a thickness of 29 mm (1.1 in). Seat distance is 930 mm (36.6 in) in Standard Class cars, 1,120 mm (44.1 in) in First Class cars. All passenger compartments are equipped with ceiling-mounted video displays, on-board audio systems, phones and vending machines.

== Train details ==
Each set is formed of two power cars and 18 coaches:

Coach No.	Description	Seating		
Coach No.	Description	1st	2nd	Toilets
Power car
1	Standard Class	0	56	1
2	First Class with wheelchair access	23 + 2	0	2
3	First Class	35	0	0
4	First Class	32	0	2
5	Standard Class	0	55	0
6	Standard Class	0	56	2
7	Standard Class	0	60	0
8	Standard Class	0	56	2
9	Standard Class	0	60	0
10	Standard Class	0	60	0
11	Standard Class	0	56	2
12	Standard Class	0	60	0
13	Standard Class	0	56	2
14	Standard Class	0	60	0
15	Standard Class	0	56	2
16	Standard Class	0	60	0
17	Standard Class (open seating at selected trains)	0	56	2
18	Standard Class (open seating at selected trains)	0	56	1
Power car

== Operation ==
=== Services ===
The KTX was launched with KTX-I trains starting revenue service on April 1, 2004 on two routes: the Seoul–Busan Gyeongbu KTX, then using the completed sections of the Gyeongbu High Speed Railway until Daegu, and the upgraded old Gyeongbu Line from there; and the Seoul–Mokpo or Seoul–Gwangju Honam KTX, using the Gyeongbu HSR until Daejeon and the upgraded old Honam Line from there. From June 2007 until October 2010, some trains in Gyeongbu KTX service ran along an alternative route leaving the Gyeongbu HSR between Daejeon and Dongdaegu to serve Gimcheon and Gumi before the opening of an extra station for the two cities on the high-speed line. From November 1, 2010, most Gyeongbu KTX services began to use the new Daegu–Busan section of the Gyeongbu HSR, some trains remained on the Gyeongbu Line on that section, and additional trains began to use the Gyeongbu Line on the Seoul–Daejeon section to serve Suwon.

The KTX-I started service with a maximum operating speed of 300 km/h (186 mph). In response to frequent passenger complaints regarding speeds on the video display staying just below the advertised 300 mark, operating top speed was raised to 305 km/h (190 mph) on November 26, 2008.

From 2006, the first car of KTX-I trains functions as a moving cinema during selected services.

=== Technical issues ===
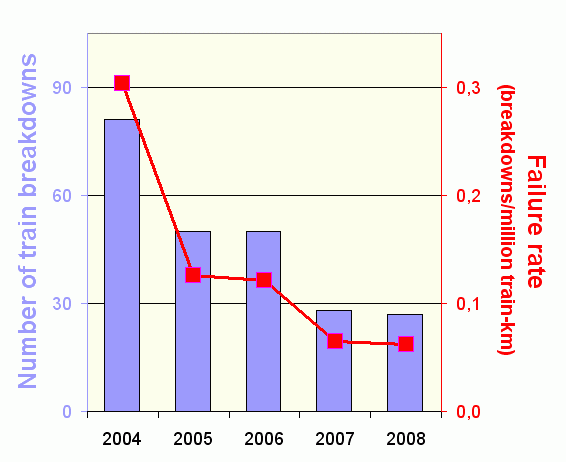
Annual number of breakdowns and failure rate

Most of the operation irregularities after the start of KTX service concerned the rolling stock, but also signalling, power glitches and track problems. From the first month of service to the fifth, the number of all operation irregularities decreased from 28 to 8, among which the number of rolling stock related incidents decreased from 18 to 5. Causes for breakdowns in the first years of operation involved inexperienced staff and insufficient inspection during maintenance. The failure rate decreased sharply by the fifth year of operation.

In an investigation report released in October 2006, representatives from the Grand National Party expressed concern about the practice to use parts from other trains for spare parts, but Korail stated that that is standard practice in case of urgency with no safety effect, and the supply of spare parts is secured. Korail is also conducting a localisation program to develop replacements for various imported parts, starting with auxiliary inverters and brake cylinders, and continuing with other auxiliary electrical equipment in the passenger cars and yaw dampers.

On June 13, 2007, near Cheongdo on the upgraded Daegu–Busan section, a damper acting between two cars of a KTX-I train got free at one end due to a loose screw and hit the trackbed, throwing up ballast that hit cars and caused bruises to two people on the parallel road, and generating smoke inside the train's passenger compartment. The train was stopped by emergency braking when passengers noticed the smoke. On November 3, 2007, an arriving KTX-I train collided with a parked KTX-I train inside Busan Station, resulting in material damage of 10 billion won to the two trains and light injuries to two persons. The accident happened because the driver has fallen asleep and disabled the train protection system, while the station dispatcher was absent from his observation point without notice. The driver was tried, convicted and fined 10 million won. The railway union noted that the driver had 2 hours and 29 minutes for sleeping between two shifts, and criticised single driver operation in conjunction with short rest times.

The noise level in the trains during tunnel passages was subject to passenger complaints. Tests in August 2005 showed that noise level reductions of 3–4 dB can be achieved with an increase of the so-called mud flaps, the rubber bands attached to the end of the intermediate cars to smooth the airflow at the articulated car joints, from a width of 100 to 143 mm (3 15/16 to 5 5/8 in). Korail then retrofitted all trains with the wider mud flaps until May 2006.

== Successive types with localised technology ==
The Korean rail industry used the know-how gained in the technology transfer for the KTX-I as the basis to develop the experimental train HSR-350x, which in turn led to orders for a Rotem-built commercial high speed train, the KTX-II.

== See also ==
- List of high speed trains
- Eurotrain
- HEMU-400X
- Tilting Train Express
- Train to Busan - a 2016 action horror film which mostly takes place within KTX-I.
