= Korean Train Control System =

Train protection system in South Korea

The Korean Train Control System (KTCS) is a train protection system established as a standard specification for the South Korean railway.

Originally, KTCS-1 is designed for urban transit lines, KTCS-2 for general lines, KTCS-3 for high-speed lines.

Since earlier than April 2018, the development has been renewed. Now KTCS system consists of KTCS-2 (for general and high-speed lines), KTCS-3 (next-generation system based on Moving block) and KTCS-M (formerly was KRTCS-1, for Urban rail transit).

== History ==
Before the development of the KTCS, South Korea did not have domestically produced train signal control system technology, so most of the core technology was imported. Afterwards, it was developed according to the national Research and development (R&D) project, the domestic signal system standardization and domestic production plan. If the Gyeongbu high-speed train signal control system is built in the country's version, KTCS-2, it will be possible to save about 1.2 trillion South Korean won or more in budget compared to the existing foreign system, and it will also be possible to provide infrastructure that supports operating speeds of up to 320 km/h.

In 2012, the Korea Railroad Research Institute, Korail and Hyundai Rotem participated as research institutes in a project led by the Ministry of Land, Infrastructure and Transport. In 2018, the world's first LTE-R wireless communication-based train control system, KTCS-2, was developed as a national R&D project, and KTCS-2, manufactured by Hyundai Rotem, completed R&D, performance verification, and product certification in the same year. Lee Seong-hae, Chairman of Korail, evaluated KTCS-2 as "a unique railway technology developed through national research and development, and a key technology that simultaneously secures the safety, efficiency, and economy of railways."

In 2022, KTCS-2 successfully completed commercial operation on the Jeolla Line. As of 2024, the design for introduction to the Gyeongbu high-speed railway for KTX (Korea Train Express) is currently underway.

== Usage ==
KTCS is largely classified into three types: KTCS-1 is designed for general lines, KTCS-2 for high-speed lines, and KTCS-M for Urban rail transit. In addition, it meets the standards of European Train Control System (ETCS). In particular, KTCS-2 is compatible with both ETCS Level-1 and Level-2.

KTCS-2 manufactured by Hyundai Rotem was applied to the Daegyeong Line electric train that started operation on December 14, 2024. KTCS-2 is scheduled to be built sequentially on the Gyeongbu High Speed Line by 2028, followed by the Honam High-speed Line and Suseo High Speed Railway (SRT).
