= Jeongeup station =

Train station in South Korea

정읍
Jeongeup
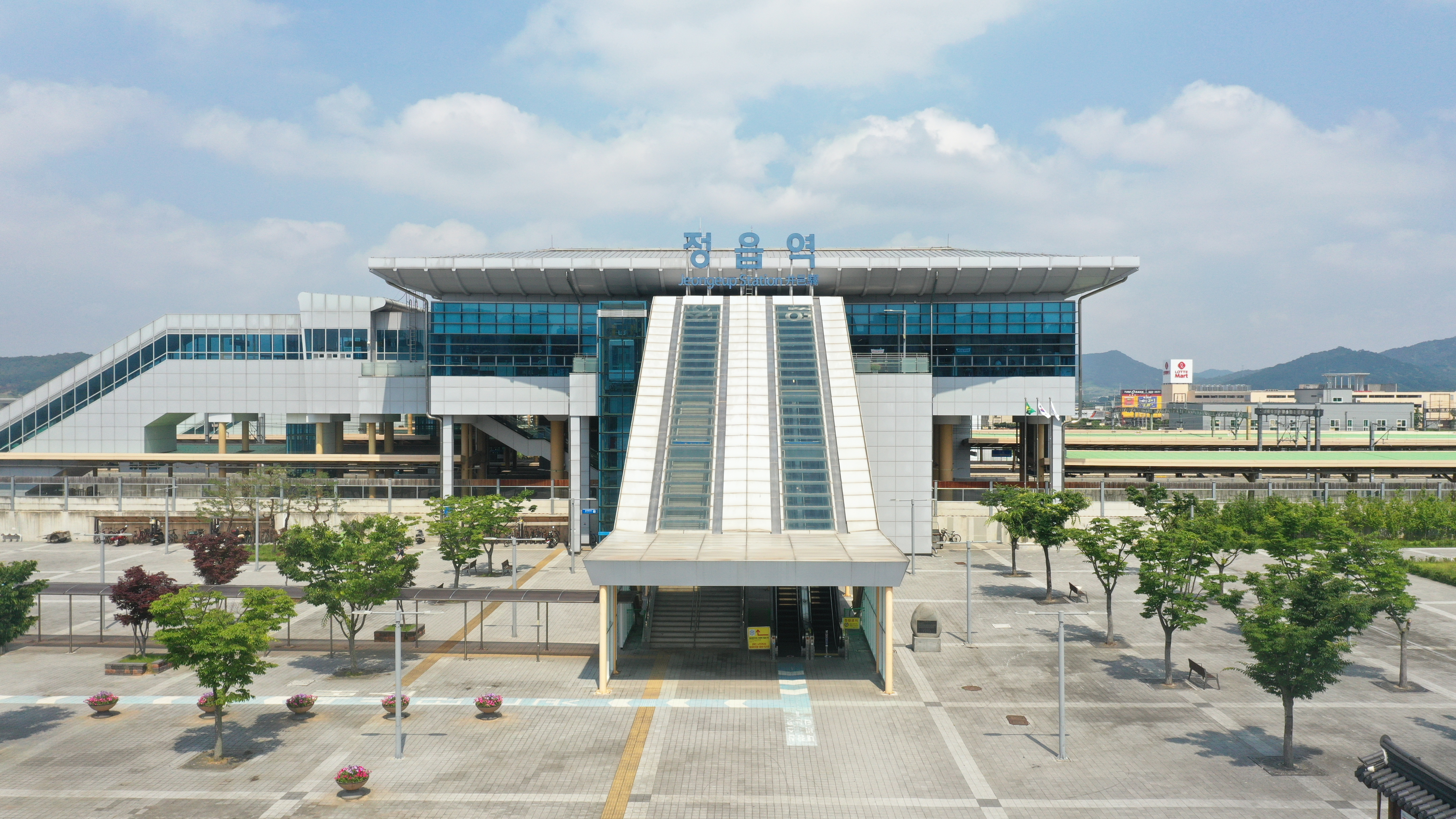
- Station building

Korean name
- Hangul: 정읍역
- Hanja: 井邑驛
- Revised Romanization: Jeongeumnyeok
- McCune–Reischauer: Chŏngŭmnyŏk

General information
- Location: Yeonji-dong, Jeongeup, North Jeolla; South Korea
- Coordinates: 35°34′32.12″N 126°50′33.14″E
- Operator: Korail
- Lines: Honam Line, Honam high-speed railway
- Platforms: 2
- Tracks: 4

Construction
- Structure type: Aboveground

History
- Opened: December 1, 1912

Services
Preceding station	Korea Train Express	Following station
Gimje towards Haengsin	Honam KTX	Jangseong towards Mokpo
Iksan towards Haengsin or Suseo	Honam KTX	GwangjuSongjeong towards Mokpo
Preceding station	Korail	Following station
Sintaein towards Yongsan	ITX-Saemaeul Honam Line	Jangseong towards Mokpo
Sintaein towards Yongsan	ITX-Saemaeul Gwangju Line	Jangseong towards Gwangju
Gimje towards Yongsan	ITX-Maum Honam Line	Jangseong towards Mokpo
Sintaein towards Yongsan	Mugunghwa-ho Honam Line	Baegyangsa towards Mokpo or Gwangju
Location

Jeongeup station is a KTX station in the city of Jeongeup, South Korea. It is on Honam high-speed railway and the normal speed Honam Line.
