= Osong station =

Major train hub in South Korea

오송
Osong
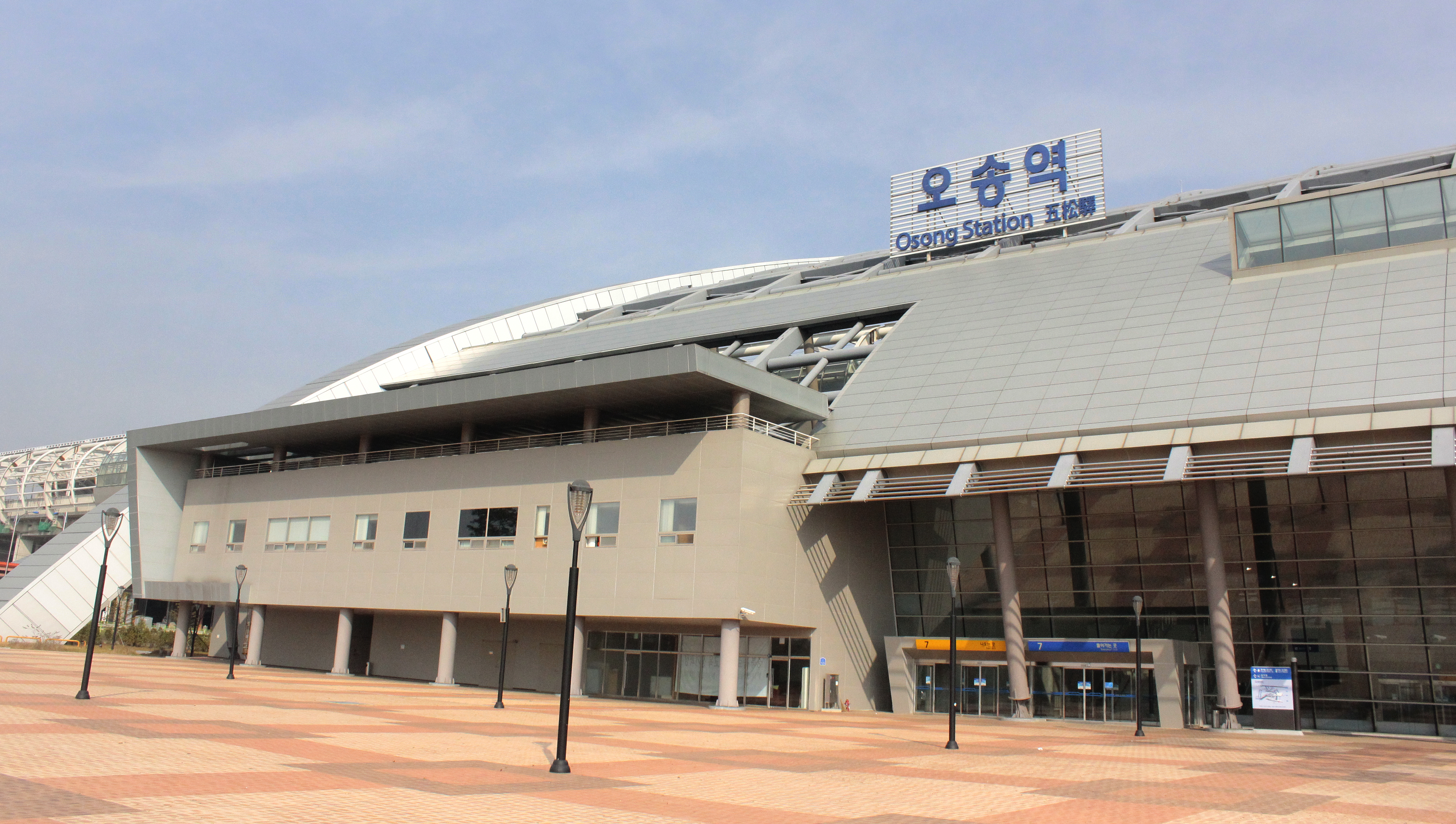

Korean name
- Hangul: 오송역
- Hanja: 五松驛
- Revised Romanization: Osongnyeok
- McCune–Reischauer: Osongnyŏk

General information
- Location: 123 Osonggarak-ro, Osong-eup, Heungdeok-gu, Cheongju, Chungcheongbuk-do; South Korea
- Coordinates: 36°37′14.85″N 127°19′40.08″E
- Operator: Korail
- Lines: Chungbuk Line; Gyeongbu High Speed Railway; Honam High Speed Railway
- Platforms: 6
- Tracks: 10
- Connections: Sejong BRT

Construction
- Structure type: Aboveground

History
- Opened: November 1, 1921

Services
Preceding station	Korea Train Express	Following station
Cheonan–Asan towards Haengsin, Seoul or Suseo	Gyeongbu KTX	Daejeon towards Busan
Cheonan–Asan towards Haengsin or Suseo	Gyeongjeon KTX	Daejeon towards Jinju
Cheonan–Asan towards Haengsin or Suseo	Donghae KTX	Daejeon towards Pohang
Cheonan–Asan towards Haengsin or Suseo	Honam KTX	Gongju towards Mokpo
Cheonan–Asan towards Haengsin or Suseo	Honam KTX	Seodaejeon towards Mokpo
Cheonan–Asan towards Haengsin, Suseo or Yongsan	Jeolla KTX	Gongju towards Yeosu-Expo
Cheonan–Asan towards Haengsin, Suseo or Yongsan	Jeolla KTX	Seodaejeon towards Yeosu-Expo
Location

Osong station (Korean: 오송역) is a train station on the Honam and Gyeongbu high-speed railways in Cheongju, North Chungcheong Province, South Korea. It is located at the intersection of the Gyeongbu KTX high-speed rail line, the conventional Chungbuk Line and, since April 2015, the Honam high-speed railway. KTX trains began calling there from November 1, 2010, bringing high-speed rail service to the nearby city of Cheongju.

Not all KTX trains call at Osong; only a select number of trains per day in each direction stop there.

While not directly attached to the station, there is a KTX test track that connects with the lines just north of the station. The facility is named 철도종합시험선로 and was expanded in 2019.

== Criticism ==
The Gyeongbu high-speed railway was originally not planned to have a station in North Chungcheong Province. The railway was also planned to be built across Sejong City instead of Cheongju. After the initial plan was revealed, residents of Cheongju insisted that authorities build Gyeongbu HSR across Cheongju and build a station there, and threatened to blow up the HSR if they did not build Osong station.

By then, there was no plan laid out by Sejong City to build this station. However, if the station was not built, there would be no HSR station in North Chungcheong Province, even though the Gyeongbu HSR passes through the aforementioned province.

The main issue with this station is that it was selected as a branch station for the Gyeongbu and Honam high-speed railways. As a result, The price of the round-trip KTX from Yongsan to GwangjuSongjeong has increased by ₩6200 and the distance from Yongsan to GwangjuSongjeong as a whole increased by 19 km.
