= Honam high-speed railway =

Railway line in South Korea

Honam HSR
- Route map

Overview
- Native name: 호남고속철도
- Status: Operational
- Owner: Korea Rail Network Authority
- Line number: 102 (KR)
- Locale: South Korea
- Termini: Osong station, Cheongju; Mokpo station, South Jeolla Province (Gwangju Songjeong Station, Gwangju)

Service
- Type: High-speed rail
- Operator(s): Korea Train Express
- Rolling stock: KTX-I, KTX-Sancheon, SRT

History
- Opened: April 1, 2015

Technical
- Line length: 230.99 km (143.53 mi)
- Number of tracks: 2
- Track gauge: 1,435 mm (4 ft 8 1/2 in) standard gauge
- Electrification: 25 kV/60 Hz Catenary
- Operating speed: 305 km/h (190 mph)

- Honam high-speed railway
- Hangul: 호남고속선
- Hanja: 湖南高速線
- RR: Honam gosokseon
- MR: Honam kosoksŏn

The Honam high-speed railway, also known as Honam HSR, is a high-speed rail between Osong (on the existing Gyeongbu high-speed railway) and Mokpo in South Korea. The line is a part of Korail's Korea Train Express (KTX) system, accelerating Seoul–Mokpo and Seoul–Gwangju KTX high-speed services which currently use the existing conventional Honam Line. On April 1, 2015, the line was inaugurated by the South Korean President Park Geun-hye with the attendance of 1200 invited guests and members of the public at Gwangju Songjeong Station in Gwangju, the line's terminus. The line diverges from Osong station on the Gyeongbu high-speed railway, and stops at Gongju, Iksan, Jeongeup Stations. Journey times between Seoul and Gwangju has been cut from 2 h 40 min to just 90 min, making daily commuting possible. The Honam HSR is intended to bring business, and economic opportunities to the province of Jeollanam-do, which has seen slower development than other parts of South Korea. The line has been open to the public since April 2, 2015 for revenue service.

== History ==
=== Origins of the project ===
The most progressed plans for a second high-speed line were for the Honam high-speed railway, a connection from Seoul to Mokpo in southwest Korea, accelerating the service on the existing route that was eventually established in KTX's first phase.

The first feasibility study in 2003 came to the conclusion that the construction of a full line is not justified by demand, and proposed a two-stage construction. The first stage, to be realised by 2015, would involve a connection from a second Seoul terminus in the southeast part of the city to the Gyeongbu HSR, and a branch from the Gyeongbu HSR to Iksan, paralleling the existing Honam Line. The second phase, to be realised by 2020, would include the separate tracks on the section paralleling the Gyeongbu Line, and the extension from Iksan to Gwangju and Mokpo, paralleling the existing Honam Line. The cost of the entire project was estimated at 10,378.6 trillion won.

On January 14, 2005, Prime Minister Lee Hae Chan met local representatives in Gwangju, who requested an early implementation of the project. Lee pointed to the failure of the first phase of the KTX in meeting ridership forecasts during its first months, expressed skepticism regarding the profitability of the Honam HSR, and described it as a long-term project. However, in December the same year, in the light of low approval in the affected provinces, the government reversed its stance and agreed to complete the project to Gwangju by 2015.

In plans made official in August 2006 in spite of a benefit–cost ratio below 1, the budget for the 182.75 km (113.56 mi) first stage (from the new Osong station on the Gyeongbu HSR to Gwangju) was set at 8,569.5 billion won. The second stage, the 48.74 km (30.29 mi) remaining to Mokpo, was to be finished by 2017 with a budget of 2,002.2 billion won. The altogether 230.99 km (143.53 mi), 10,571.7 billion won project would enable Seoul–Mokpo travel times of 1 hour 46 minutes. Ahead of the 2007 Presidential elections, eventual winner Lee Myung-bak promised to accelerate the project by 3 years (with the first section finished by 2012). While this date was deemed unrealistic by the responsible ministry, a one-year acceleration (first phase in 2014) was announced in January 2009. The Osong-Iksan section of the first phase is also intended for use as high-speed test track for rolling stock development, to be fitted with special catenary and instrumented track.

The project is financed to 50% by direct government funds and 50% loans.

=== Construction ===
By December 2009, construction began on three sub-sections of the 182 km (113 mi) line from Osong to Gwangju, which shall enable Seoul–Gwangju travel times of 1 hour 30 minutes. The ground-breaking ceremony was held at Gwangju·Songjeong Station in the attendance of President Lee Myung-bak on December 4, 2009, when total project costs were estimated at 11.3 trillion won (US$9.8 billion). As of September 2010, progress was 9.6% of the project budget then estimated at 10,490.1 billion won for the first phase, while the estimate for the entire line stood at 12,101.7 billion won.

The entire line from Osong to Mokpo includes a total of 111.7 km (69.4 mi) of viaducts (48.35%) and 49.12 km (30.52 mi) of tunnels (21.26%).

== Stations ==
Trains will stop at seven stations along the line:

Station	Line distance	Distance from Seoul	Travel time (all-stops)	Travel time (limited stops)
Osong station	0.00 km	121.4 km	0h49m	-
Gongju station	43.8 km	165.2 km	1h06m	-
Iksan station	89.8 km	211.2 km	1h23m	1h01m
Jeongeup station	131.9 km	253.3 km	1h40m	-
GwangjuSongjeong Station	182.4 km	303.8 km	1h58m	1h30m
Naju station	198.2 km	319.6 km	2h08m	-
Mokpo station	249.2 km	370.6 km	2h35m	-

== Services ==
=== Honam KTX ===
Honam KTX
Overview
- Service type: High-speed rail
- Status: Operating
- Locale: South Korea
- First service: April 1, 2004
- Current operator: Korail
- Former operator: Korean National Railroad
- Daily ridership: 17,599 (2008)

Route
- Termini: Yongsan station or Haengsin station Mokpo station or Gwangju station
- Stops: 14/12 (normal Yongsan–Mokpo, –Gwangju); 15/13 (including Haengsin)
- Distance travelled: 404.4 km (251.3 mi) (Yongsan–Mokpo); 349.6 km (217.2 mi) (Yongsan–Gwangju)
- Average journey time: 2h 58m (Yongsan–Mokpo); 2h 38m (Yongsan–Gwangju)
- Service frequency: 38 (Monday-Thursday); 40 (Friday-Sunday) (Dec 15, 2010 timetable)

On-board services
- Classes: First class, Standard class No reserved seat (weekday only)
- Disabled access: First class only
- Seating arrangements: Airline style with table
- Catering facilities: On-board vending machine Snack tray
- Entertainment facilities: On-board television Multi channel audio broadcast (first class only)
- Baggage facilities: Overhead racks baggage storage

Technical
- Rolling stock: KTX-I, KTX-II (KTX-Sancheon)
- Track gauge: 1,435 mm (4 ft 8 1/2 in)
- Electrification: 25 kV/60 Hz catenary
- Operating speed: 305 km/h (190 mph)

When Honam KTX services started on April 1, 2004, the shortest rail travel time between the capital and Mokpo was reduced from 4 hours 32 minutes to 2 hours 58 minutes. between Seoul and Gwangju, the time reduced from 3 hours 53 minutes to 2 hours 38 minutes.

At the Seoul end, since the December 15, 2004, timetable change, most Honam KTX services don't terminate in Seoul Station, the terminus of the Gyeongbu KTX services, but in nearby Yongsan Station, from where the travel distance to Mokpo Station is 404.4 km (251.3 mi). In addition, some services are extended beyond Yongsan, passing Seoul Station and continuing for 14.9 km (9.3 mi) along the Gyeongui Line to terminate at Haengsin station, next to which KTX trains have a depot.

The service uses the Gyeongbu HSR until Daejeon, and the upgraded Honam Line from there. The service calls at the following stations:

Station	Travel distance	
Haengsin station	0.0 km	-
Yongsan station	18.1 km	0.0 km
Gwangmyeong station	36.9 km	18.8 km
Cheonan-Asan station	110.9 km	92.8 km
Osong station	139.5 km	121.4 km
Seodaejeon station	175.7 km	157.6 km
Gyeryong station	195.4 km	177.3 km
Nonsan station	220.8 km	202.7 km
Iksan station	257.9 km	239.8 km
Gimje station	275.6 km	257.5 km
Jeongeup station	301.4 km	283.3 km
Jangseong station	333.8 km	315.7 km
Gwangju station (spur line)	367.7 km	349.6 km
GwangjuSongjeong Station	355.7 km	337.6 km
Naju station	371.5 km	353.4 km
Mokpo station	422.5 km	404.4 km

The frequency of Honam HSR services was increased in steps from the initial 34 daily runs in 2004, and changes between a minimum 38 services a day on weekdays and a maximum 40 on weekends from the November 1, 2010 timetable.

==== Ridership ====
Ridership/day
2004	11,667
2005	15,113
2006	17,257
2007	17,270
2008	17,599

The predicted first-year average daily ridership of the Honam KTX Line was raised from 22,818 in a November 1999 estimate to 36,085 in the final August 2003 forecast. Actual first-year numbers were about a half of the original estimate, but rose significantly in the second and third year.

In its first year of operation, the Honam KTX service also underperformed in seat occupation relative to the Gyeongbu KTX service. By 2005, KTX fares were selectively reduced for relations under-performing most, especially on the Honam Line:

Standard class one-way ticket price for adults (won)
Fare system	Seoul to...			Yongsan to...		
Fare system	Iksan	Gwangju	Mokpo	Iksan	Gwangju	Mokpo
Plans in early 2004	28,600	38,200	42,900	(28,300)	(37,900)	(42,600)
Valid from April 1, 2004	27,000	36,600	41,400	26,700	36,300	41,100
Valid from April 25, 2005	-	-	-	25,500	33,300	38,000

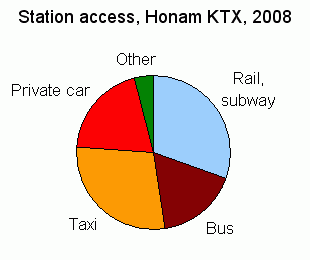

Following general ticket price increases and the separation of weekday and weekend fares, as of November 2010, the standard one-way Seoul to Mokpo ticket price stands at 40,500 won on weekdays and 43,300 won on weekends, but with significant reductions on newly introduced non-reserved seats. Another problem passenger surveys in the first months found was station access and the limited capacity of bus connections, leading to the frequent use of taxis.

==== Modal share ====
After its first year of operation, on relations with significant distances along the conventional Honam Line, the Honam KTX service gained market share mostly at the expense of conventional trains, while the total share of rail was stagnant on some relations. By 2008, between Yongsan and the cities mid-way along the Honam Line, rail's total modal share passed 50%. Strong gains at the expense of air transport and private cars were seen between Yongsan and Honam KTX service endpoints Mokpo and Gwangju, too.

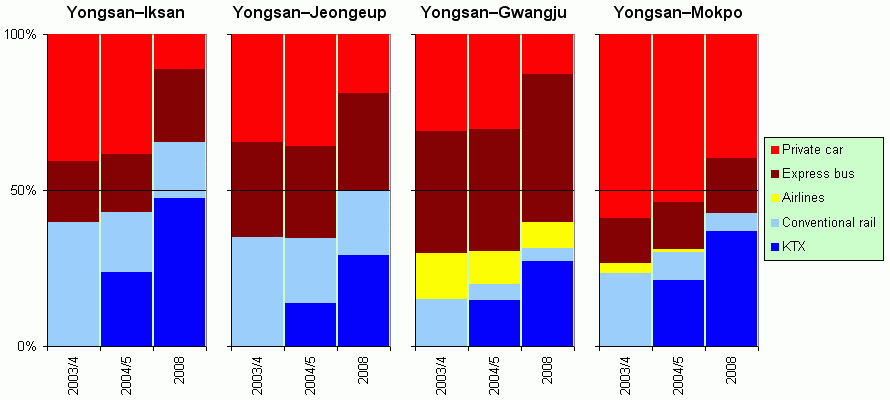
Evolution of modal shares on selected relations with Honam KTX service

==== Future improvements ====
Starting from April 2011, the new Jeolla KTX service shared tracks with the Honam KTX until Iksan, and diverged from there to reach Yeosu along the Jeolla Line. Korail also planned to run some through KTX services to Incheon International Airport on the AREX line from 2012. The travel time between Incheon International Airport and Gwangju is 3 hours.

From 2014, the Honam KTX service was to transferred to the Honam High Speed Railway between Osong on the Gyeongbu HSR and Gwangju·Songjeong. By 2017, the service would transfer to the new line on the remaining section to Mokpo, too.

== See also ==
- KTX
- SRT
