= Iksan station =

Train station in South Korea

Coordinates: 35°56′29.89″N 126°56′44.87″E

익산
Iksan
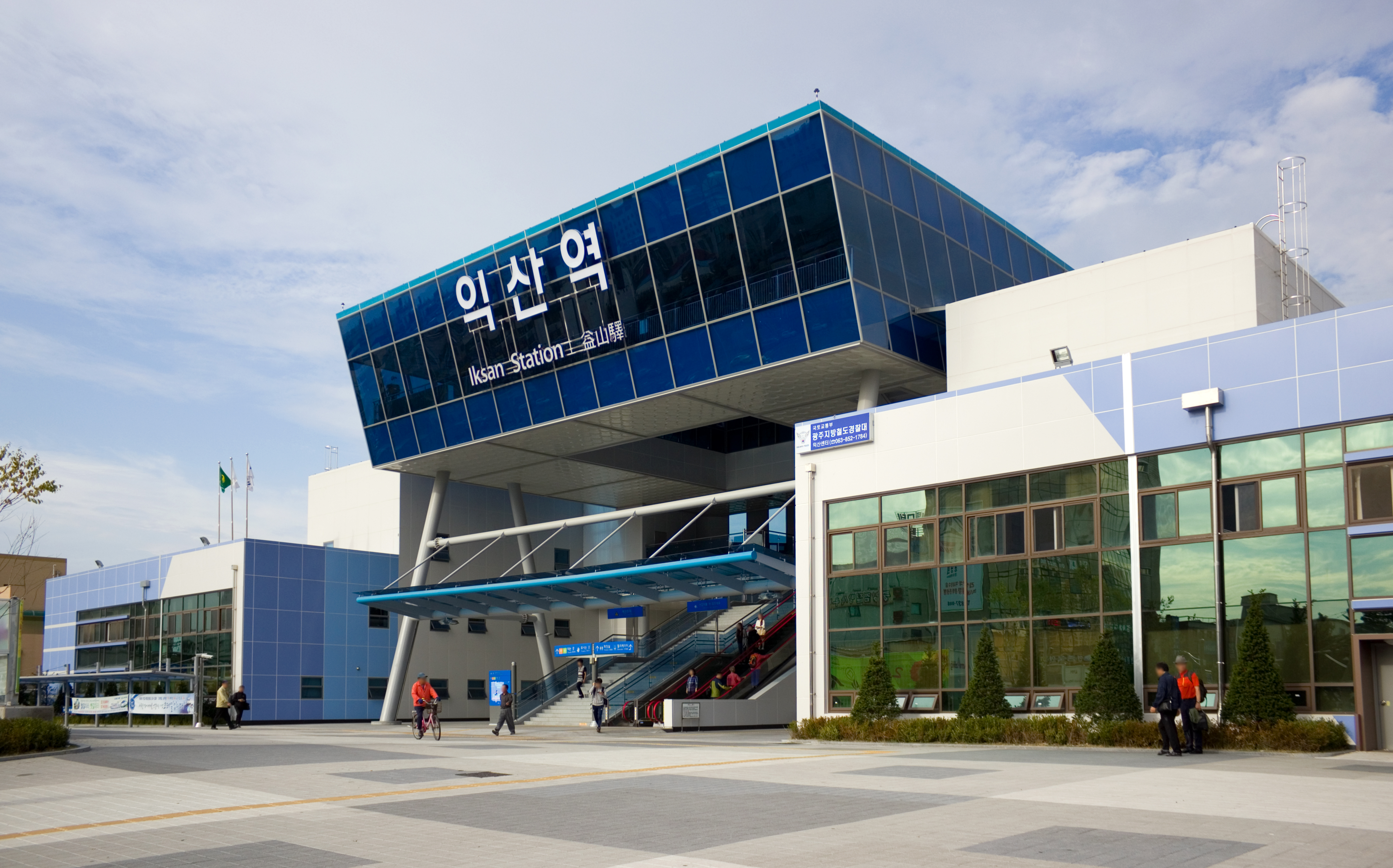

Korean name
- Hangul: 익산역
- Hanja: 益山驛
- Revised Romanization: Iksan-yeok
- McCune–Reischauer: Iksan-yŏk

General information
- Location: 153 Iksan-daero, Iksan. Jeonbuk-do; South Korea
- Operator: Korail
- Lines: Honam HSR; Honam Line; Jeolla Line; Janghang Line
- Platforms: 6
- Tracks: 18

Construction
- Structure type: Aboveground
- Parking: Yes

History
- Opened: January 1, 1915
- Rebuilt: 2015

Services
Preceding station	Korea Train Express	Following station
Gongju towards Haengsin	Honam KTX	Gimje towards Mokpo
Nonsan towards Haengsin or Suseo	Honam KTX	Jeongeup towards Mokpo
Gongju towards Suseo	Honam KTX	Jeongeup towards Mokpo
Gongju towards Haengsin or Suseo	Jeolla KTX	Jeonju towards Yeosu-Expo
Nonsan towards Yongsan or Suseo	Jeolla KTX	Jeonju towards Yeosu-Expo
Preceding station	Korail	Following station
Gunsan towards Yongsan	Saemaeul-ho Janghang Line	Terminus
Ganggyeong towards Yongsan	ITX-Saemaeul Honam Line	Gimje towards Mokpo
Ganggyeong towards Yongsan	ITX-Saemaeul Honam Line	Terminus
Ganggyeong towards Yongsan	ITX-Saemaeul Gwangju Line	Gimje towards Gwangju
Ganggyeong towards Yongsan	ITX-Saemaeul Jeolla Line	Jeonju towards Yeosu-Expo
Nonsan towards Yongsan	ITX-Maum Honam Line	Gimje towards Mokpo
Nonsan towards Yongsan	ITX-Maum Jeolla Line	Jeonju towards Yeosu-Expo
Hamyeol towards Yongsan	Mugunghwa-ho Honam Line	Gimje towards Mokpo or Gwangju
Daeya towards Yongsan	Mugunghwa-ho Janghang Line	Terminus
Hamyeol towards Yongsan	Mugunghwa-ho Jeolla Line	Samnye towards Yeosu-Expo
Nonsan towards Seoul	S-Train West	Jeonju towards Yeosu-Expo
Gunsan towards Yongsan	G-Train	Terminus
Location

Iksan station is on South Korea's high-speed KTX railway network, 243 km south of Yongsan station.

== History ==
The station opened on January 1, 1915, and KTX trains on the Honam Line began services on April 1, 2004. The most notable incident to occur at this station was an explosion that occurred at 9:15 p.m. on November 11, 1977. The explosion occurred as dynamite being transported from Incheon to Gwangju caught alight. The station was then known as "Iri station" (이리역), Iri being Iksan's former name.

== Services ==
Iksan station serves KTX trains on the Honam high-speed railway and the normal speed Honam Line. It also has express services and local services on the normal speed Honam Line. Trains on the Jeolla and Janghang Lines also call at this station.

== See also ==
- Transportation in South Korea
- Korail
- KTX
- Iri station explosion
