= Gongju station =

Railway station in South Korea

공주
Gongju
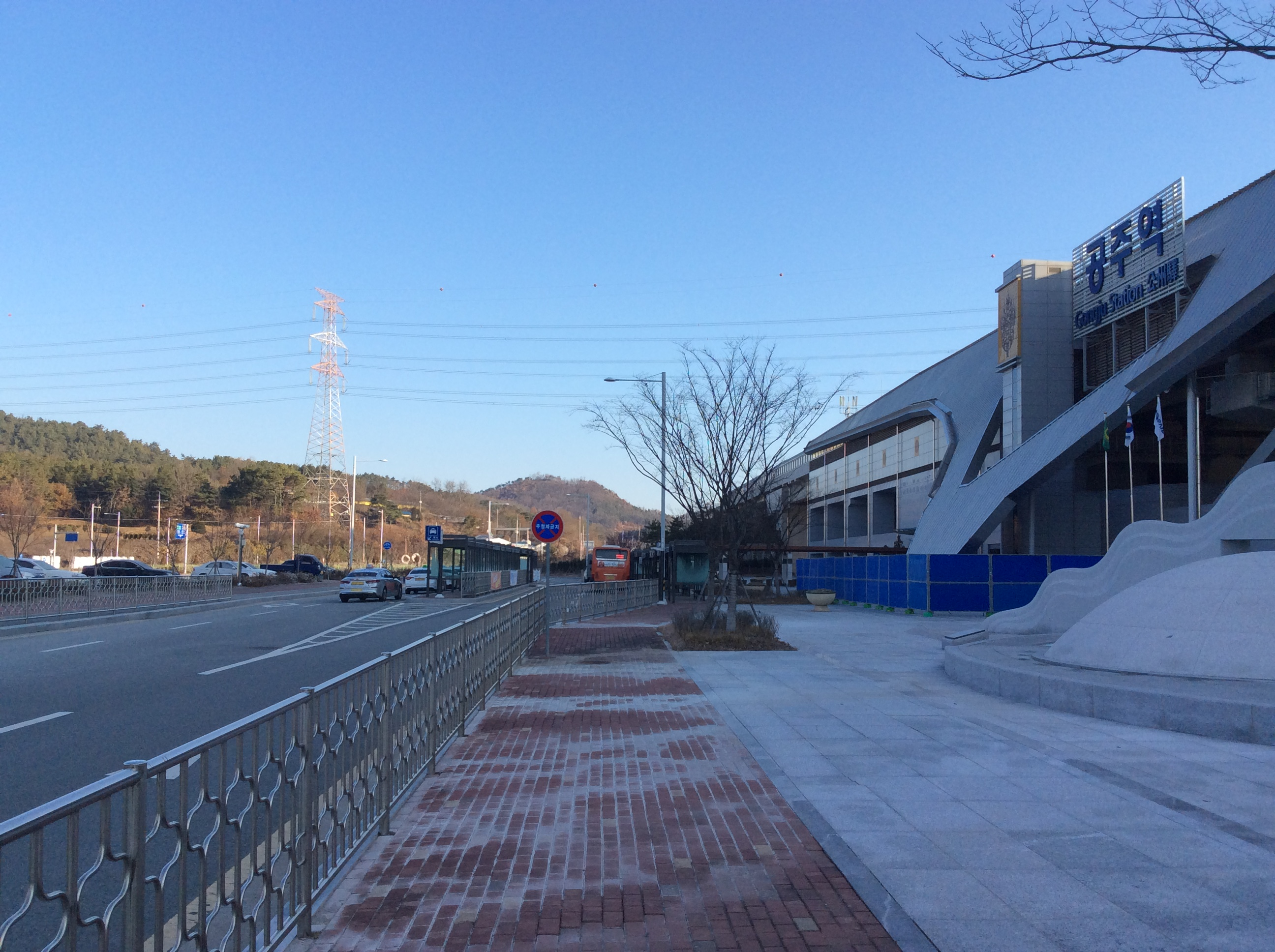

Korean name
- Hangul: 공주역
- Hanja: 公州驛
- Revised Romanization: Gongjuyeok
- McCune–Reischauer: Kongjuyŏk

General information
- Location: 100 Saebit-ro, Iin-myeon, Gongju, Chungcheongnam-do; South Korea
- Coordinates: 36°19′57″N 127°05′49″E
- Operator: Korail
- Line: Honam High Speed Railway
- Platforms: 2
- Tracks: 2

Construction
- Structure type: Aboveground

History
- Opened: 13 February 2015

Services
Preceding station	Korea Train Express	Following station
Osong towards Haengsin or Suseo	Honam KTX	Iksan towards Mokpo
Osong towards Haengsin, Suseo or Yongsan	Jeolla KTX	Iksan towards Yeosu-Expo
Location

Gongju station is a station on South Korea's Honam High Speed Railway.

== See also ==
- Korea Train Express
