= Gyeongbu high-speed railway =

Major Seoul-Busan transport link in South Korea

Gyeongbu HSR

Overview
- Native name: 경부고속선
- Status: In operation: Seoul–Daejeon; Daejeon–Daegu; Daegu–Busan; Planned: downtown Seoul
- Owner: Korea Rail Network Authority
- Termini: Seoul Station (actual end of line: Siheung Interconnection near Geumcheon-gu Office station); Busan Station
- Stations: 6

Service
- Type: High-speed rail
- Operator: Korea Train Express
- Depot(s): Osong; Gwangmyeong (night); Yeongdong (maintenance)
- Rolling stock: KTX-I, KTX-Sancheon, SRT

History
- Opened: 1 April 2004: Seoul–Daejeon; Daejeon–Daegu; 1 November 2010: Daegu–Busan; 1 August 2015: downtown Daejeon; downtown Daegu

Technical
- Line length: 346.4 km (215.2 mi) (2010 without interconnectors); 387.3 km (240.7 mi) (from 2014)
- Num of tracks: 2
- Track gauge: 1,435 mm (4 ft 8 1/2 in)
- Minimum radius: 7,000 m (23,000 ft)
- Electrification: 25 kV/60 Hz catenary
- Operating speed: 305 km/h (190 mph); 350 km/h (217 mph) design

- Gyeongbu high-speed railway
- Hangul: 경부고속선
- Hanja: 京釜高速線
- RR: Gyeongbu gosokseon
- MR: Kyŏngbu kosoksŏn

The Gyeongbu high-speed railway, also known as Gyeongbu HSR, is South Korea's first high-speed rail line from Seoul to Busan. KTX high-speed trains operate on three sections of the line. On 1 April 2004, the first two sections commenced service: one between a junction near Geumcheon-gu Office station, Seoul and a junction at Daejeonjochajang station north of Daejeon, and another between a junction at Okcheon station, southeast of Daejeon, and a junction near Jicheon station, north of Daegu. On 1 November 2010, the third section started operations. The section ran between a junction west of Daegu and Busan. The missing sections through the urban areas of Daejeon and Daegu were under construction, with opening expected in 2014, and separate tracks into Seoul Station were also being planned. The temporary ends of the three sections were connected to the parallel conventional Gyeongbu Line by tracks that would serve as interconnecting branches upon completion of the entire line. On 1 August 2015, line construction between the urban areas of Daejeon and Daegu was completed, thus connecting all sections of the HSR.

As of November 2010, two train services use the line: the Gyeongbu KTX Line, with trains running along the Gyeongbu HSR or the parallel Gyeongbu Line only; and the Honam KTX Line, with trains leaving the Gyeongbu HSR at Daejeon and continuing on the conventional Honam Line. A number of other high-speed lines branching from the Gyeongbu HSR are planned or under construction, and several more KTX services using connecting conventional rail lines are also planned. After 2016, the privately owned SRT service started operations on the railway from Suseo station in Seoul.

== History ==
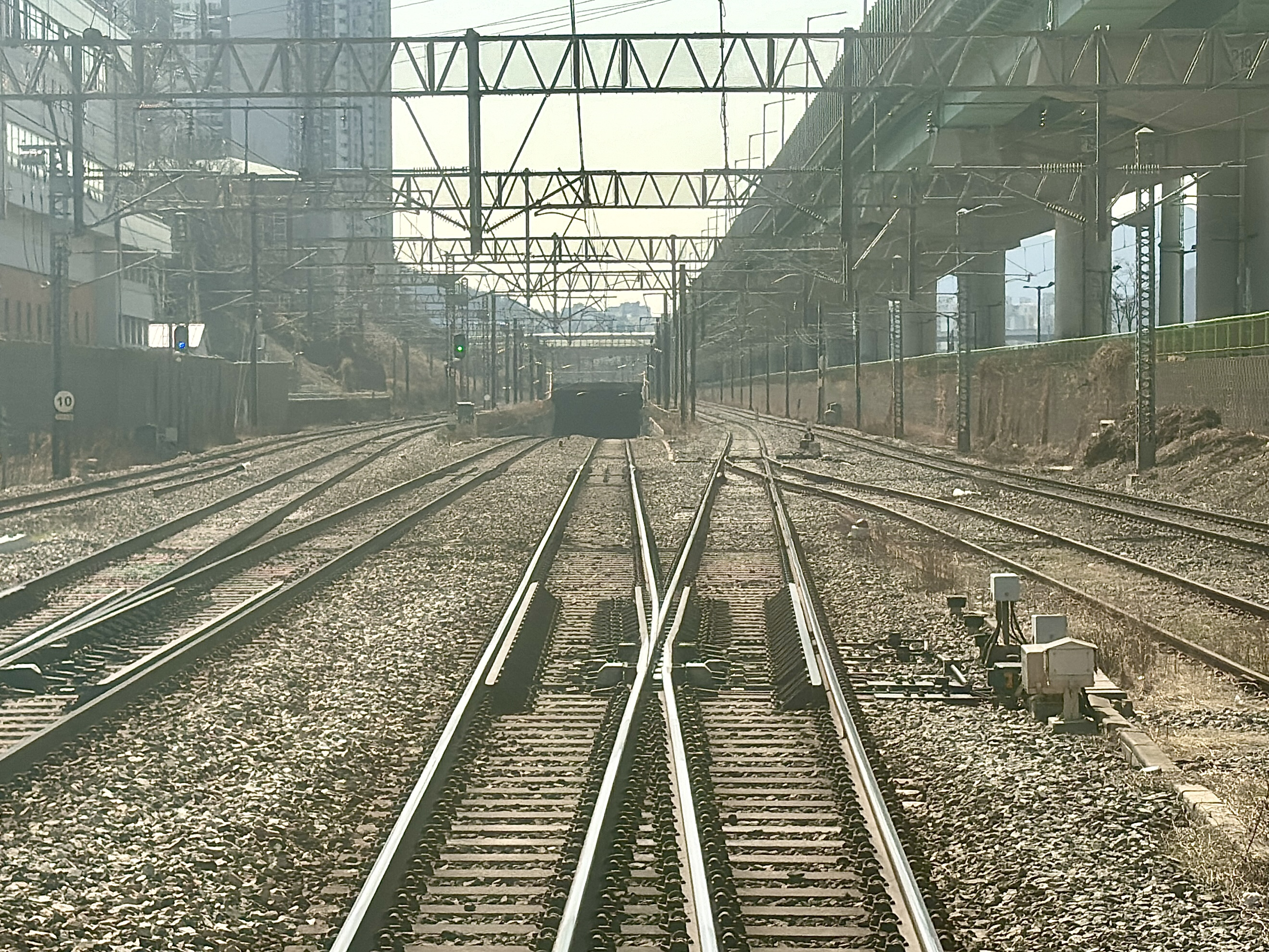
Actual start of the Gyeongbu high-speed railway south of the Geumcheon-gu Office Station (formerly Siheung Station)

=== Origins ===
The Seoul-Busan axis is Korea's main traffic corridor. In 1995, it housed 73.3% of Korea's population and accounted for 70% of freight traffic and 66% of passenger traffic. With both the Gyeongbu Expressway and Korail's Gyeongbu Line congested, the government saw the need for another mode of transport.

The first proposals for a second Seoul-Busan railway line originated from a study prepared between 1972 and 1974 by experts from France's SNCF and Japan Railway Technical Service at the request of the IBRD. A more detailed 1978-1981 study by KAIST, focusing on the needs of freight transport, also concluded that separating long-distance passenger traffic onto a high-speed passenger railway would be advisable, and this proposal was therefore included in Korea's next Five Year Plan.

During the following years, several feasibility studies were conducted for a high-speed line between Busan and Seoul with a travel time of 1 hour and 30 minutes, and they produced positive results. In 1989, following the go-ahead for the project, the institutions responsible for preparing it were established: the Gyeongbu High Speed Electric Railway & New International Airport Committee and the High Speed Electric Railway Planning Department (later renamed the HSR Project Planning Board). In 1990, the foreseen Seoul-Busan travel time was 1 hour 51 minutes, the project was scheduled for completion by August 1998, and costs were estimated at 5,846.2 billion South Korean won (₩) in 1988 prices, of which ₩4.8 trillion was allocated for the high-speed line itself and the remainder for rolling stock.

In 1991, bids were called for the supply and technology transfer of the core system technology, which included the rolling stock, catenary, and signalling of the line. On 26 August 1991, three competitors submitted bids: a consortium led by GEC-Alsthom (today Alstom), one of the builders of France's TGV trains; Siemens, one of the builders of Germany's ICE trains; and Mitsubishi, one of the builders of Japan's Shinkansen trains.

As planning progressed, the Korea High Speed Rail Construction Authority (KHSRCA) was established in March 1992 as a separate body with its own budget, responsible for the project. In the 1993 reappraisal of the project, the completion date was pushed back to May 2002, and estimated costs grew to ₩10.74 trillion. 82% of the cost increase was due to a 90% increase in unit costs in the construction sector (mostly labour costs but also material costs), while the remainder was due to alignment changes (a longer route and more stations), though some city tunnels were dropped. To finance the project, the option of a Build-Operate-Transfer (BOT) franchise was rejected as too risky. Funding included direct government grants (35%), government (10%) and foreign (18%) loans, domestic bond sales (31%) and private capital (6%).

=== Start of construction ===
KHSRCA started construction of the Gyeongbu high-speed railway (Gyeongbu HSR) on 30 June 1992, along the 57 km (35 mi) long section from Cheonan to Daejeon, which was intended for use as a test track.

Construction started before the main technology supplier was chosen, so the alignment design was intended to be compatible with all options. Superstructure-related design specifications included a minimum curve radius of 7,000 m (22,966 ft), a maximum gradient of 1.5%, which was later increased to 2.5%, an open-line cross section including two tracks with centrelines 5.0 m (16 ft 5 in) apart, and a two-track tunnel cross-sectional area of 107 m^{2} (1,152 sq ft). Of the planned 411 km (255 mi) line, 152.73 km (94.90 mi) would be laid on bridges, and another 138.68 km (86.17 mi) would be in tunnels. However, plans were changed repeatedly, in particular those for city sections, following disputes with local governments. Planned operating speed was also reduced from 350 km/h (215 mph) to the 300 km/h (185 mph) maximum of high-speed trains on the market. With project variants of up to 430.7 km (267.6 mi) in length, Seoul–Busan travel times of up to 2 hours 4 minutes were projected.

Construction suffered from early quality problems. After an independent safety inspection in 1996, repairs were needed at 190 locations, and partial reconstruction was required at another 39 locations.

Meanwhile, the bidding process for the core system technology contract progressed through five rounds of evaluation, and the French and German consortia submitted final bids on 15 June 1993. KHSRCA announced that the GEC-Alsthom-led consortium was the preferred bidder on 20 August 1993, and the contract was signed on 14 June 1994. The consortium consisted of GEC-Alsthom and its Korean subsidiary Eukorail.

The technology was almost identical to that found on the high-speed lines of France's TGV system. Track-related design specifications included a design speed of 350 km/h (215 mph), standard gauge, continuously welded rails with a UIC 60 profile (60 kg/m (120 lb/yd)), 2.6 m (8 ft 6 in) wide concrete sleepers, a 35 cm (14 in) high ballast bed, swing-nose switches for high-speed passage, 25 kV/60 Hz electrification, standard French TVM 430 automatic cab signalling, and centralised train control.

=== First phase: Seoul–Daegu and connected upgrades ===
KTX network map in January 2021, with the Gyeongbu HSR in blue

Following the 1997 Asian financial crisis, the government decided to realise the Gyeongbu HSR in two phases. In a first phase, 222.1 km (138.0 mi) of the high-speed line would be finished by 2004, with trains travelling on the upgraded conventional line for the rest of the planned 409.8 km (254.6 mi) route. Once the now 412 km (256 mi) long Gyeongbu HSR was completed, including 112 km (70 mi) of viaducts and 189 km (117 mi) of tunnels, travel time was projected to be 1 hour 56 minutes. The budget for the first phase was set at ₩12,737.7 billion, while that for the entire project was set at ₩18,435.8 billion in 1998 prices. While the share of government contributions remained unchanged, the shares of foreign loans, domestic bond sales and private capital changed to 24%, 29% and 2%, respectively.

Well ahead of the opening of the Gyeongbu HSR for regular service, 34.4 km (21.4 mi) of the test section was finished in December 1999 to enable trials with trains. The test section extended to 57.2 km (35.5 mi) on 26 June 2000.

After further design changes, the high-speed tracks were finished over a length of 223.6 km (138.9 mi), with 15.0 km (9.3 mi) of interconnections to the conventional Gyeongbu Line, including at a short interruption at Daejeon. The high-speed section itself included 84 viaducts with a combined length of 83,078 m (51.622 mi), including the 6,844 m (22,454 ft) Pungse Viaduct; and 46 tunnels with a combined length of 75,621 m (46.989 mi), among them the 10,290 m (33,760 ft) Iljik Tunnel and the 9,970.5 m (32,712 ft) Hwanghak Tunnel. Hwanghak Tunnel became Korea's longest bored tunnel once the line opened.

The project budget also included the electrification of the short connecting section at Daejeon and the Daegu-Busan section of the existing Gyeongbu Line, as well as the entire Honam Line from Daejeon to Mokpo. The Seoul–Busan route length was reduced from 441.7 to 408.5 km (274.5 to 253.8 mi).

The infrastructure and rolling stock were built under a technology transfer agreement between core system supplier Alstom and local companies, with Alstom's part of the project amounting to US$2.1 billion or €1.5 billion. Other foreign contributors included SNCF (training and supervision of infrastructure and operations), Pandrol and Vossloh (rail fastenings), and Cegelec (catenary). Domestic partners for the infrastructure work included LG Industrial Systems and Samsung (signalling and train control), and ILJIN and LG Cable (catenary). SYSTRA and Bechtel were also involved in project management.

After 12 years of construction, service on the first phase of the Gyeongbu HSR started on 1 April 2004.

=== Second phase: Daegu–Busan ===
The Daegu–Busan section of the Gyeongbu HSR became a separate project with the July 1998 project revision, with a budget of ₩5,698.1 billion to be funded by direct government and private contributions at the same ratios as for phase 1. In August 2006, the project was modified to include the downtown passages of Daejeon and Daegu, as well as additional stations along the phase 1 section at Osong, between Cheonan and Daejeon, and Gimcheon, between Daejeon and Daegu. Consequently, the budget was increased to ₩7,190.0 billion, and the government's share of the funding was increased by 5 percentage points to 50%.

Construction started in June 2002. The 128.1 km (79.6 mi) of new tracks, consisting of the 4.0 km (2.5 mi) South Daegu Interconnection, 122.8 km (76.3 mi) of high-speed tracks, and a 1.3 km (0.81 mi) low-speed section connecting to Busan station, follows a long curve to the northeast of the existing Gyeongbu Line, with new stations for Gyeongju and Ulsan built well outside of the city centres. The Seoul–Busan travel distance along the second-phase route is 423.8 km (263.3 mi). The section includes 54 viaducts with a total length of 23.4 km (14.5 mi) and 38 tunnels with a total length of 74.2 km (46.1 mi). The two largest structures are the 20,323 m (66,677 ft) long Geomjeung Tunnel, under Mount Geumjeong at the Busan end of the line, and the 13,270 m long Wonhyo Tunnel, under Mount Cheonseong south-west of Ulsan. Once the line opens, these will be the longest and second-longest tunnels in Korea, respectively.

The original plans foresaw a second phase opening in 2008, with new trains travelling at a top speed of 350 km/h (217 mph), cutting Seoul–Busan travel times to just 1 hour and 56 minutes. However, construction was delayed, and trains with higher top speeds were not yet available. The main cause of the delay was a long dispute over the environmental impact assessment of the Wonhyo Tunnel, which passes under a wetland area. The dispute gained nationwide and international attention due to the repeated hunger strikes of a Buddhist nun, led to a suspension of works in 2005, and ended only with a Supreme Court ruling in June 2006.

For the second phase of the Gyeongbu HSR, the RHEDA 2000 ballastless track system from the German manufacturer RAIL.ONE was chosen. However, construction was affected by quality problems concerning sleepers and fastenings. In February 2009, cracks were found in 332 newly laid concrete sleepers on the 96.9 km (60.2 mi) long section between Daegu and Ulsan; the cause was inadequate waterproofing. Meanwhile, it was revealed that the Pandrol and Vossloh clips chosen for the rail fastenings had undergone only indoor testing, with field tests omitted, and that the Pandrol clips had not previously been used on another high-speed line.

With the exception of the sections across Daejeon and Daegu, the second phase went into service on 1 November 2010. By that time, ₩4,905.7 billion had been spent from the second-phase budget, out of a total project budget of ₩17,643.4 billion.

The two sections across the urban areas of Daejeon and Daegu, totalling 40.9 km (25.4 mi), were planned for completion by 2014 and were expected to reduce the Seoul–Busan travel distance to 417.4 km (259.4 mi). They went into service in 2015. As of October 2010, the total cost of the second phase was estimated at ₩7,945.4 billion, while that of the entire project was estimated at ₩20,728.2 billion.

=== 2020s bottleneck relief: Pyeongtaek–Osong ===
In June 2023, construction began to expand the 46.95 km (29.17 mi) two-track segment between Pyeongtaek and Osong to four tracks to relieve a crucial bottleneck in the KTX network. The Ministry of Land, Infrastructure and Transport is tunnelling 50 m (160 ft) below the existing right of way and building parallel bridges to install the new pair of tracks. The project has a budget of ₩3.18 billion (US$2.5 billion) and is scheduled for completion in 2028. Korail will also procure 17 KTX-Cheongryong trainsets to meet future induced demand on the line.

=== Other connected high-speed lines ===
The Honam HSR branches from the Gyeongbu HSR at its newly built Osong station and is intended to speed up Honam KTX services to Mokpo. Construction of the first stage from Osong to Gwangju began in December 2009, and it was planned to be opened in 2014. However, the line would not open to the public until one year later, on 1 April 2015.

The original plans for the Honam HSR included a branch from the existing Gyeongbu HSR near its northern end to Suseo-dong, a southeastern ward of Seoul. The Suseo High-Speed Railway was announced as a separate project on 30 December 2009, with a route from a junction with the Gyeongbu HSR at Pyeongtaek to Suseo. The project had a projected completion date of 2014.

Singyeongju station on the second-phase section of the Gyeongbu HSR was to become a junction with the realigned Ulsan–Gyeongju–Pohang section of the Donghae Nambu Line, which was scheduled to open in 2014. On 23 April 2009, the government approved the project and held a ground-breaking ceremony. In January 2010, the government confirmed the early completion of the Pohang branch.

On 1 September 2010, the government released a new strategic plan aimed at reducing travel times to under 2 hours for 95% of Korea's population by 2020. Longer-term plans under consideration included a branch from the Gyeongbu HSR to Jinju and further to the southern coast.

== Stations ==
Six new stations were built along the Gyeongbu HSR from Seoul to Busan.

- Gwangmyeong station, in the southwestern suburbs of Seoul
- Cheonan-Asan (Onyangoncheon) station, west of Cheonan and east of Asan
- Osong station, near Osong (opened on 1 November 2010)
- Gimcheon (Gumi) station, east of Gimcheon (opened on 1 November 2010)
- Gyeongju station, south of Gyeongju (opened with the Daegu-Busan section on 1 November 2010)
- Ulsan Station, west of Ulsan (opened with the Daegu-Busan section on 1 November 2010)

Now completed, the Gyeongbu HSR connects to four existing main stations in major cities, which KTX trains reach on the conventional Gyeongbu Line.

- Seoul: plans for separate tracks until Gwangmyeong were abandoned when the project was phased in 1998
- Daejeon: separate tracks across downtown Daejeon opened in 2015
- Dongdaegu: separate tracks across downtown Daegu opened in 2016
- Busan: the terminus of the line since 1 November 2010

== Operation ==
Gyeongbu KTX

Overview
- Service type: High-speed rail
- Status: Operating
- Locale: South Korea
- First service: 1 April 2004
- Current operator: Korail
- Former operator: Korean National Railroad
- Ridership: 85,685 (2008)

Route
- Termini: Seoul Station, Haengsin station Busan Station
- Stops: 11/10 (normal with/out Haengsin); 11/10 (via Gupo with/out Haengsin); 9 (via Suwon)
- Distance travelled: 423.8 km (263.3 mi); 417.4 km (259.4 mi) (2014) (Seoul–Busan normal route); 408.9 km (254.1 mi) (Seoul–Busan via Gupo); 421.2 km (261.7 mi) (Seoul–Busan via Suwon)
- Average journey time: 2h 18m 2h 10m (2014) (Seoul–Busan normal route); 2h 59m (Seoul–Busan via Gupo); 3h 20m (Seoul–Busan via Suwon)
- Service frequency: 124 (Monday); 120 (Tuesday-Thursday); 145 (Friday); 154 (Saturday); 153 (Sunday) (17 January 2011 timetable)

On-board services
- Classes: First class, Standard class No reserved seat (weekday only)
- Disabled access: First class only
- Seating arrangements: Airline style with table
- Catering facilities: On-board vending machine Snack tray
- Entertainment facilities: On-board television On-board cinema (car 1); Multi channel audio broadcast (first class only)
- Baggage facilities: Overhead racks baggage storage

Technical
- Rolling stock: KTX-I, KTX-II (KTX-Sancheon)
- Track gauge: 1,435 mm (4 ft 8 1/2 in)
- Electrification: 25 kV/60 Hz catenary
- Operating speed: 305 km/h (190 mph)

=== General ===
Regular service started on the first phase of the Gyeongbu HSR on 1 April 2004, with KTX-I trains reaching a maximum speed of 300 km/h (186 mph). In response to frequent passenger complaints that the speeds shown on the video display stayed just below the advertised 300 km/h, the operating top speed was raised to 305 km/h (190 mph) on 26 November 2008. From 2 March 2010, KTX-II (KTX-Sancheon) trains began operating on the line in commercial service at the same top speed.

As of 2011, all KTX services routed along the line also used sections of connected conventional mainlines.

The first incident on the high-speed line occurred on 11 February 2011, when a KTX-Sancheon train bound for Seoul from Busan derailed on a switch in the Iljik Tunnel, 500 m (1,600 ft) before Gwangmyeong station, while travelling at around 90 km/h (56 mph). No casualties were reported, and only one passenger suffered a slight injury, but KTX traffic was blocked for 29 hours while repairs were carried out. A preliminary investigation indicated that the accident resulted from a series of human errors. Workers had improperly repaired a point along the tracks. Investigators found that the derailment was caused by a switch malfunction triggered by a loose nut on the track, and suspected that a repairman had failed to tighten it during maintenance the previous night. The switch's detectors had signalled a problem earlier. However, a second maintenance crew failed to find the loose nut and did not properly communicate this to the control centre, which then allowed the train onto the track. The rail union criticised Korail's use of hired repairmen. According to the investigation, there were no problems with the train.

=== Gyeongbu KTX ===
KTX trains that do not deviate from the Seoul–Busan corridor operate as the Gyeongbu KTX service. When introduced in 2004, the new service cut travel time between Seoul and Busan from 4 hours 10 minutes to 2 hours 40 minutes. The Seoul–Busan travel distance was shortened from 441.7 to 408.5 km (274.5 to 253.8 mi). The fastest services made intermediate stops only in Daejeon and Daegu; other stations were served by trains with different stopping patterns. Some Gyeongbu KTX services continued to serve the original route after the opening of the second phase of the Gyeongbu HSR on 1 November 2010, with travel times of between 2 hours 55 minutes and 3 hours.

Korail met local demand by introducing additional KTX services between Seoul and Dongdaegu in June 2007. These services left the Gyeongbu HSR between Daejeon and Dongdaegu to serve Gimcheon and Gumi on the conventional line. These services were discontinued with the opening of Gimcheon (Gumi) station on the high-speed line. New services introduced with the same timetable change left the Gyeongbu HSR on the Seoul–Daejeon section to serve Suwon.

With the opening of the Daegu–Busan section on 1 November 2010, the fastest Seoul–Busan services, which used the entire Gyeongbu HSR and stopped only in Daejeon and Dongdaegu, reduced the shortest travel time by 22 minutes, to 2 hours 18 minutes. From 1 December 2010, Korail added a pair of non-stop trains with a travel time of 2 hours 8 minutes. With the completion of the sections through the urban areas of Daejeon and Daegu, the four-stop travel time between Seoul and Busan is expected to decrease further, to 2 hours and 10 minutes.

The Gyeongbu HSR operated 94 services per day when service began in April 2004. Three and a half months later, trains that ran only on certain days of the week were introduced, while the overall service frequency was reduced. Since then, the total weekly train frequency increased with each timetable change, fluctuating between a minimum of 120 services from Tuesday to Thursday and a maximum of 154 services on Saturdays in the timetable introduced on 17 January 2011.

==== Evolution of long-distance passenger traffic ====
When the project began, initial ridership on the Gyeongbu HSR was expected to be 200,000 passengers a day. In the first estimate after the project was divided into phases, the predicted average daily ridership for the first year of the Gyeongbu KTX Line was 141,497, but this figure was reduced to 115,828 in the final forecast in August 2003. Actual first-year ridership was about half the final estimate, but rose significantly in the second and third years. In October 2010, before the opening of the Daegu–Busan section, Korail expected total KTX ridership, including Honam KTX, to rise from 106,000 to 135,000 passengers a day.

Ridership/day
2004	60,717
2005	73,567
2006	82,716
2007	84,851
2008	85,685

On the short-distance route between Seoul and Cheonan, KTX gained only a modest market share, with little effect on the overall modal share of intercity rail, due to the short distance and the location of the KTX station outside the city. On the medium-distance route from Seoul to Daejeon, KTX gained market share mostly at the expense of conventional express services on the Gyeongbu Line and helped increase rail's overall share to a third. On the long-distance routes from Seoul to Daegu and Busan, KTX captured the majority of the market and most rail passengers, increasing rail's overall share from around two-fifths to a market-dominating two-thirds by 2008.

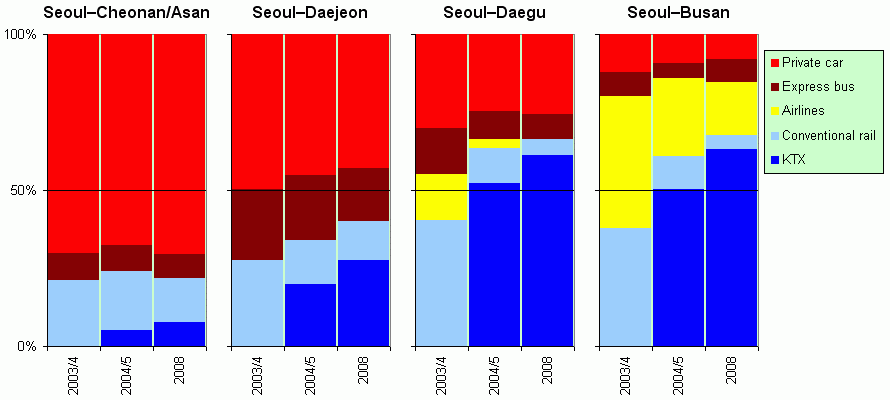
Evolution of modal shares on selected relations with Gyeongbu KTX service

==== Gyeongbu KTX stops ====
The terminal for most Gyeongbu KTX services is Seoul Station, but some trains continue 14.9 km (9.3 mi) beyond Seoul Station along the Gyeongui Line to terminate at Haengsin station, which was added because of its proximity to the main KTX maintenance facility, Goyang depot.

Station (Hangul, Hanja)	Connecting lines and services	Distance from previous station	Distance from Seoul	Location
Haengsin station (행신, 幸信) (some trains)	Honam KTX; Gyeongui Line	-	-14.9 km (9.3 mi)	Goyang-si, Gyeonggi-do
Seoul (서울, 서울)	Gyeongbu Line; Gyeongui Line; Gyeongin Line; Seoul Subway Line 1 Seoul Subway Line 4 AREX GTX Line A	14.9 km (9.3 mi)	0.0 km (0 mi)	Jung-gu, Seoul-teukbyeolsi
Gwangmyeong (광명, 光明)	Honam KTX; Gwangmyeong Line (Seoul Subway Line 1)	22.0 km (13.7 mi)	22.0 km (13.7 mi)	Gwangmyeong-si, Gyeonggi-do
Cheonan-Asan (천안아산, 天安牙山)	Honam KTX; Janghang Line	74.0 km (46.0 mi)	96.0 km (59.7 mi)	Asan-si, Chungcheongnam-do
Osong (오송, 五松)	Honam KTX; Chungbuk Line	28.6 km (17.8 mi)	124.6 km (77.4 mi)	Cheongju-si, Chungcheongbuk-do
Daejeon (대전, 大田)	Gyeongbu Line; Daejeon Line; Daejeon Subway Line 1	35.2 km (21.9 mi)	159.8 km (99.3 mi)	Dong-gu, Daejeon-gwangyeoksi
Gimcheon(Gumi) (김천(구미), 金泉(龜尾))	-	73.8 km (45.9 mi)	233.6 km (145.2 mi)	Gimcheon-si, Gyeongsangbuk-do
Dongdaegu (동대구, 東大邱)	Gyeongbu Line; Daegu Line; Daegu Subway Line 1	53.1 km (33.0 mi)	286.7 km (178.1 mi)	Dong-gu, Daegu-gwangyeoksi
Gyeongju (경주, 慶州)	-	49.0 km (30.4 mi)	335.7 km (208.6 mi)	Gyeongju-si, Gyeongsangbuk-do
Ulsan (울산, 蔚山)	-	30.0 km (18.6 mi)	365.7 km (227.2 mi)	Ulju-gun, Ulsan-gwangyeoksi
Busan (부산, 釜山)	Gyeongbu Line; Busan Subway Line 1	51.7 km (32.1 mi)	417.4 km (259.4 mi)	Dong-gu, Busan-gwangyeoksi
Services using the conventional Gyeongbu Line beyond Dongdaegu
Gyeongsan (경산, 慶山)	Gyeongbu Line	12.3 km (7.6 mi)	299 km (186 mi)	Gyeongsan-si, Gyeongsangbuk-do
Miryang (밀양, 密陽)	Gyeongbu Line	43.0 km (26.7 mi)	342 km (213 mi)	Miryang-si, Gyeongsangnam-do
Gupo (구포, 龜浦)	Gyeongbu Line; Busan Subway Line 3	43.6 km (27.1 mi)	385.6 km (239.6 mi)	Buk-gu, Busan-gwangyeoksi
Busan (부산, 釜山)	Gyeongbu Line; Busan Subway Line 1	16.5 km (10.3 mi)	402.1 km (249.9 mi)	Dong-gu, Busan-gwangyeoksi

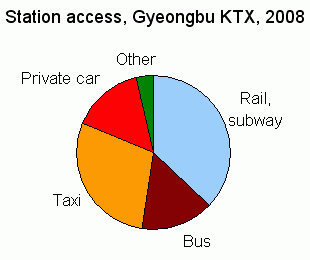
The pie chart demonstrates the stastistics

Passenger surveys in the first few months found that the most frequently mentioned problems were the limited capacity of bus connections and the lack of subway connections to intermediate stations, especially the newly built stations at Gwangmyeong and Cheonan-Asan. A better connection to Cheonan-Asan station was provided by an extension of Seoul Subway Line 1 along the Janghang Line, which opened on 14 December 2008. Gwangmyeong station was linked to the same subway line by a shuttle service on 15 December 2006, but the service had little impact because of the long-standing differences between KTX and subway train schedules.

=== Future plans ===
A connecting line between Suwon Station and PyeongtaekJije Station is scheduled to open by the end of 2026. The new route includes a station for the KTX at Seojongni and will enable these services via Suwon to bypass the Gyeongbu Main Line through Daejeon.

=== Other services ===
Services that use the Gyeongbu HSR only between Seoul and Daejeon before continuing along the Honam Line operate as the Honam KTX service. When introduced in 2004, the new service cut travel time between Yongsan in Seoul and Mokpo from 4 hours 42 minutes to 2 hours 58 minutes. From April 2011, the new Jeolla KTX service was scheduled to use the same section of the Gyeongbu HSR to reach Yeosu along the Honam and Jeolla Lines, reducing the Seoul–Yeosu travel time from 5 hours 13 minutes to 2 hours 55 minutes. After the completion of the first stage of the Honam HSR and the Suseo HSR, most Honam and Jeolla KTX services are expected to use the Gyeongbu HSR only between the junction near Pyeongtaek and Osong.

Services that use the Gyeongbu HSR between Seoul and Dongdaegu before diverging onto the Gyeongbu Line to reach the Gyeongjeon Line operate as the Gyeongjeon KTX service, which began on 15 December 2010, initially reaching Masan with a minimum travel time of 2 hours 54 minutes. This service was scheduled to be extended to Jinju by 2012.

From 2012, Korail planned to extend some KTX services to Incheon International Airport on the AREX line. The planned travel time between Incheon International Airport and Busan was 2 hours 41 minutes.

From 2015, a KTX service between Seoul and Pohang, diverging from the Gyeongbu HSR to the Donghae Line at Singyeongju station, was planned to cut travel time by 33 minutes to 1 hour 50 minutes.

=== Test runs ===
The section from Cheonan to Daejeon, with Osong depot as the operations base, was used to commission the KTX-I trains before regular service began. After regular service began, test runs were concentrated during the night, when no regular trains ran. At 1:24 am on 16 December 2004, the experimental train HSR-350x achieved the South Korean rail speed record of 352.4 km/h (219.0 mph) on the line.

== Branch lines ==
There are eight branch lines on the Gyeongbu high-speed railway: seven are operating and one is under construction.

Line Number	Name (Hangul)	Name (English)
10101	시흥연결선	Siheung Connecting Line
10102	대전남연결선	Daejeon Southern Connecting Line
10103	대구북연결선	Daegu Northern Connecting Line
10104	광명주박기지선	Gwangmyeong Night Depot Line
10105	오송정비기지선	Osong Car Repair Yard Line
10106	영동정비기지선	Yeongdong Car Repair Yard Line
10107	건천연결선	Geoncheon Connecting Line
10108	화성고속연결선	Hwaseong High-speed Connecting Line

== See also ==
- KTX
- SRT
