= Naju station =

Railway station in Naju, South Korea

나주
Naju
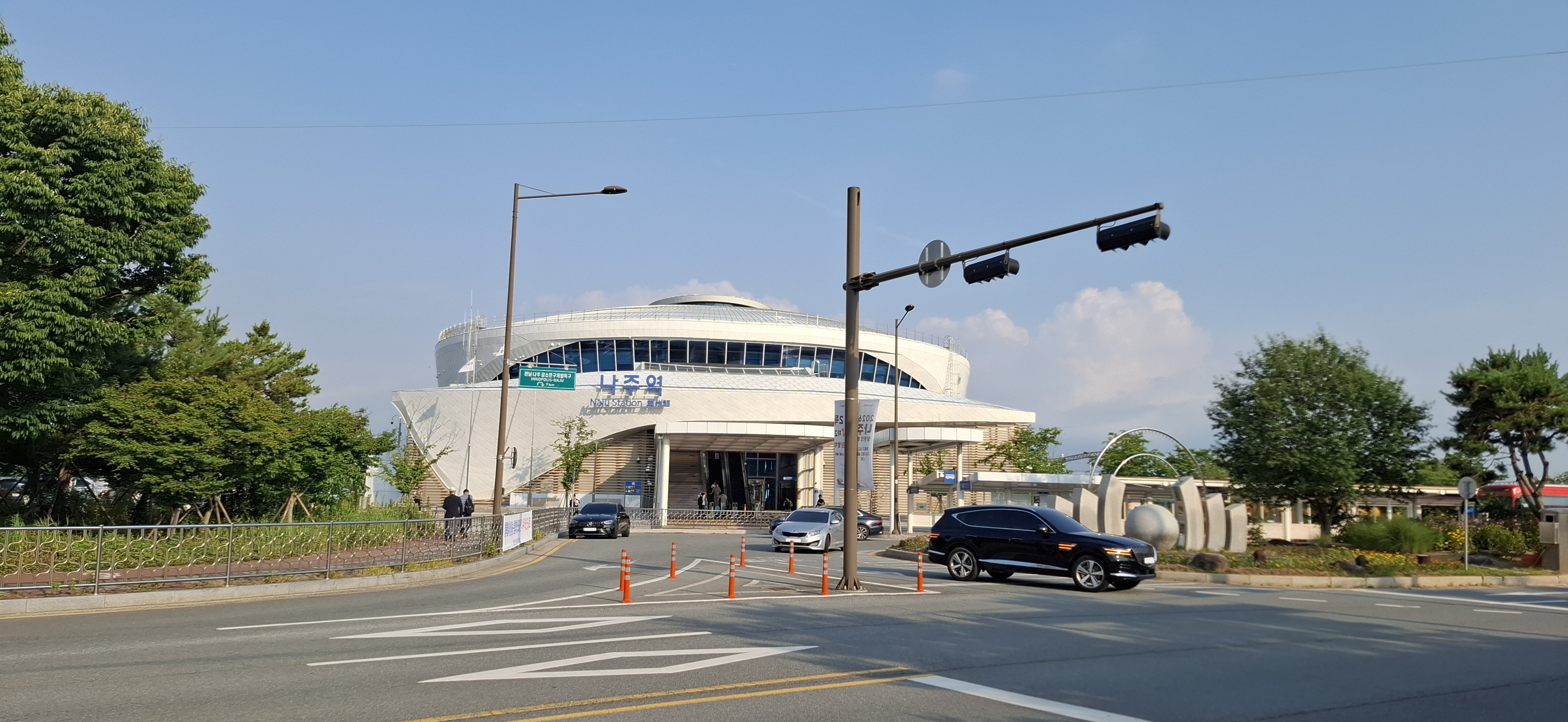

Korean name
- Hangul: 나주역
- Hanja: 羅州驛
- Revised Romanization: Najuyeok
- McCune–Reischauer: Najuyŏk

General information
- Location: Songwol-dong, Naju, South Jeolla; South Korea
- Coordinates: 35°00′51″N 126°43′01″E
- Operator: Korail
- Line: Honam Line
- Platforms: 2
- Tracks: 4

Construction
- Structure type: Aboveground

History
- Opened: July 1, 1913

Services
Preceding station	Korea Train Express	Following station
GwangjuSongjeong towards Haengsin or Suseo	Honam KTX	Mokpo Terminus
Preceding station	Korail	Following station
GwangjuSongjeong towards Yongsan	ITX-Saemaeul Honam Line	Hampyeong towards Mokpo
GwangjuSongjeong towards Yongsan	ITX-Maum Honam Line	Hampyeong towards Mokpo
GwangjuSongjeong towards Yongsan	Mugunghwa-ho Honam Line	Dasi towards Mokpo
GwangjuSongjeong towards Yongsan or Gwangju	Mugunghwa-ho Honam Line	Dasi towards Mokpo
Location

Naju station is a KTX & regional station in the city of Naju. It is on the Honam Line.
