= GwangjuSongjeong station =

Railway station in Gwangju, South Korea

광주송정
GwangjuSongjeong
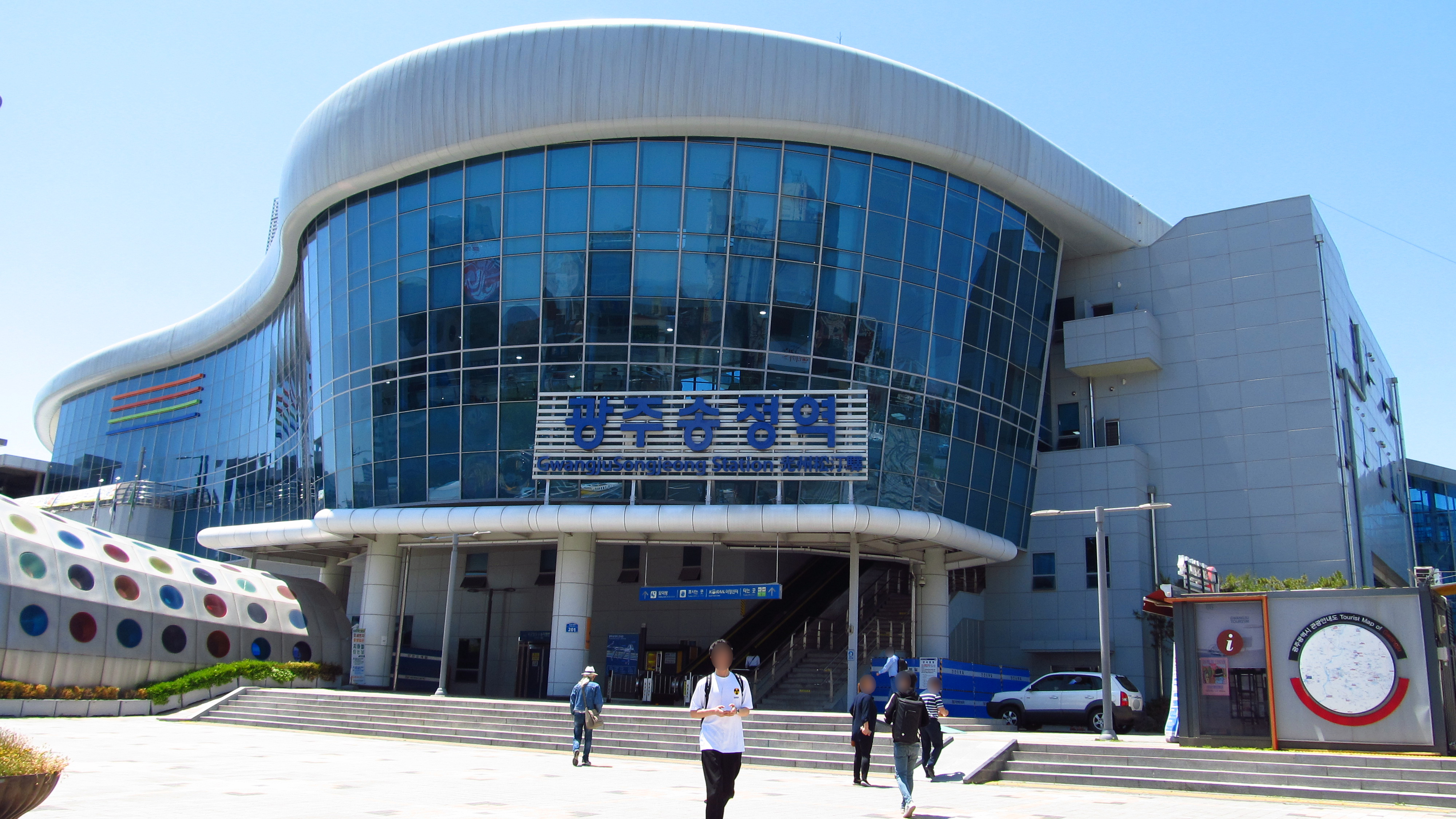

Korean name
- Hangul: 광주송정역
- Hanja: 光州松汀驛
- Revised Romanization: Gwangjusongjeongnyeok
- McCune–Reischauer: Kwangjusongjŏngnyŏk

General information
- Location: 201 Sangmu-daero, Gwangsan District, Gwangju; South Korea
- Coordinates: 35°8′16.24″N 126°47′24.84″E
- Operator: Korail
- Lines: Honam High Speed Railway; Honam Line; Gyeongjeon Line; Gwangju Line
- Platforms: 5
- Tracks: 13

Construction
- Structure type: Aboveground/Straight

History
- Opened: October 1, 1913
- Former names: Songjeong-ri

Services
Preceding station	Korea Train Express	Following station
Jangseong towards Haengsin	Honam KTX	Naju towards Mokpo
Jeongeup towards Haengsin or Suseo	Honam KTX	Naju towards Mokpo
Preceding station	Korail	Following station
Jangseong towards Yongsan	ITX-Saemaeul Honam Line	Naju towards Mokpo
Jangseong towards Yongsan	ITX-Maum Honam Line	Naju towards Mokpo
Jangseong towards Yongsan	Mugunghwa-ho Honam Line	Naju towards Mokpo
Geungnakgang towards Gwangju	Mugunghwa-ho Honam Line Gwangju-Mokpo	Naju towards Mokpo
Seogwangju towards Suncheon	Mugunghwa-ho Gyeongjeon Line	Terminus
Location
- Location within South Korea

GwangjuSongjeong station (formerly Songjeong-ri station) is a station in Gwangju, South Korea. It is on the national high-speed KTX railway network, 341 km south of Yongsan Station.

== History ==
The station opened on November 1, 1914, and the building was moved to its current location on September 18, 1988. KTX trains on the Honam Line began services on April 1, 2004.

The government of Gwangju City changed the name of Songjeong-ri station to GwangjuSongjeong station on April 1, 2009.

== Services ==
GwangjuSongjeong Station serves KTX trains on the Honam Line. It also has express services and local services on the normal speed Honam Line and on the Gyeongjeon Line. Under the same name, the station is currently on Line 1 of Gwangju's subway network. From April 2, 2015, intercity bus stops were established in front of Songjeong station in Gwangju.

== See also ==
- Transportation in South Korea
- Korail
- KTX
