= Expo Line =

Expo Line may refer to:

- Expo Line (SkyTrain), a rapid transit line in Greater Vancouver, Canada
- E Line (Los Angeles Metro), a light rail line in Los Angeles County, California, United States; formerly known as the "Expo Line"
  - Expo Bike Path, a rail with trail bicycle path and pedestrian route that travels roughly parallel to the line
- Expo Express, a former rapid transit line in Montreal, Canada
- Line 13 (Shanghai Metro), a rapid transit line in Shanghai, China, also known as the "Expo Line"

== See also ==
- Expo Station (disambiguation)
