= Mokpo–Boseong Line =

Planned railway line in South Korea

Overview
- Native name: 목포보성선(木浦寶城線)
- Status: Operational
- Owner: Korea National Railway
- Locale: South Jeolla
- Termini: Sinboseong; Imseong-ri
- Stations: 7

Service
- Operator: Korail

History
- Opened: 27 September 2025

Technical
- Line length: 79.2 km (49.2 mi)
- Num of tracks: Single track
- Track gauge: 1,435 mm (4 ft 8 1/2 in) standard gauge

Korean name
- Hangul: 목포보성선
- Hanja: 木浦寶城線
- RR: Mokpo-Boseong seon
- MR: Mokp'o-Posŏng sŏn

The Mokpo-Boseong Line (Korean: 목포보성선) is a railway line connecting Imseong-ri and Deungnyang in South Jeolla Province, South Korea.

== History ==
- 27 September 2025: Opened.

== Stations ==
Station name			Transfer	Distance in km		Location	
Romanized	Hangul	Hanja	Transfer	Station distance	Total distance	Location	
Sinboseong	신보성	新寶城	Boseong Connecting Line	0.0	0.0	Jeollanam-do	Boseong-gun
Jangdong	장동	長東		8.5	8.5	Jeollanam-do	Jangheung-gun
JeonnamJangheung	전남장흥	全南長興		12.4	20.9	Jeollanam-do	Jangheung-gun
Gangjin	강진	康津		13.8	34.7	Jeollanam-do	Gangjin-gun
Haenam	해남	海南		13.5	48.2	Jeollanam-do	Haenam-gun
Yeongam	영암	靈岩		17.7	65.9	Jeollanam-do	Yeongam-gun
Imseong-ri	임성리	任城里	Honam Line	13.3	79.2	Jeollanam-do	Mokpo-si

=== Boseong Connecting Line ===
Station name			Transfer	Distance in km		Location	
Romanized	Hangul	Hanja	Transfer	Station distance	Total distance	Location	
Miryeok	미력	彌力	Gyeongjeon Line	0.0	0.0	Jeollanam-do	Boseong-gun
Sinboseong	신보성	新寶城	Mokpo-Boseong Line	2.4	2.4	Jeollanam-do	Boseong-gun
