= G Train =

G Train could refer to:

== Railway ==
- G-Train (Korail), a South Korean tourist train also known as the West Gold Train
- G-series trains, a service category of high-speed trains in China
- G (New York City Subway service), a rapid transit service in New York, United States
- G series (Toronto subway), retired rapid transit cars used in Toronto, Canada
- G scale, a size of model railroading ranging from 1:19 to 1:32

== People ==
- the nickname of Fraser Gehrig, former St Kilda Australian rules footballer
- the nickname of Caitlin Greiser, St Kilda Australian rules footballer
