= Expo Station =

Expo station may refer to:

- Expo MRT station, in Tampines, Singapore
- Expo Station, a maglev rail station in Daejeon, South Korea
- Expo Station, the former name of Daejeonjochajang station, South Korea
- Yeosu Expo station, a terminus station of Jeolla Line, South Korea
