= G-Train (Korail) =

Tourist train in South Korea

G-Train aka West Gold Train
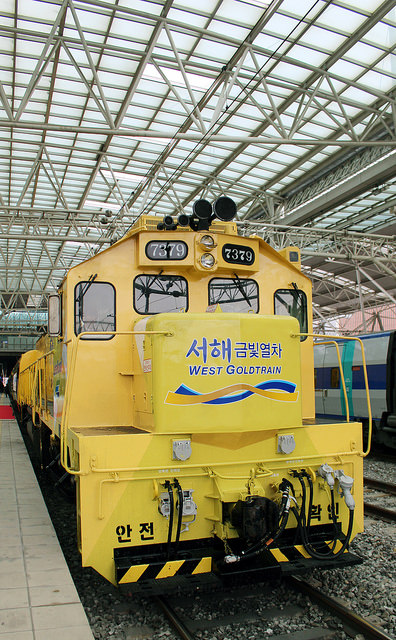

Overview
- Service type: Tourist train
- Status: Operating
- Locale: South Korea
- First service: February 5, 2015
- Current operator: Korail

Route
- Termini: Yongsan; Iksan
- Lines used: Gyeongbu Line; Janghang Line

Technical
- Track gauge: 1,435 mm (4 ft 8 1/2 in) standard gauge

G-Train aka West Gold Train (Korean: 서해금빛열차) is a South Korean tourist train operated by Korail. The train began operations in 2015 and transports tourists from Seoul along the coastal areas of the West Sea.

== Overview ==
The train opened on February 5, 2015, and runs from Yongsan Station in Seoul to Iksan Station in Jeollabuk-do and back again. The train travels to several stops located near tourist points, seven of which are Asan Hot Springs in Asan, Sudeoksa Temple in Yesan, Namdang Port Hongseong, Daecheon Beach and mud fields in Boryeong, the National Institute of Ecology in Seocheon, a cultural heritage street, and nearby islands at Gunsan and the Iksan Jewelry Museum in Iksan.

The letter "G", in the name, stands for "gold", a reference to seven "golden" destinations on the West Coast, where the train stops. And the exterior of the train is decorated to symbolize those seven regional destinations, with seven shiny jeweled patterns.

The train has five passenger cars, some with heated foot jacuzzis with seats facing the windows in the cafeteria section, the "Footbath Café", for drinking tea. One car has nine rooms, which seat six people, with heated floors, ondol style, like the traditional hanok floor heating, common in Korean homes.

Activities on the train include an amateur comedian's show, and ecological programs offered by the National Institute of Ecology.

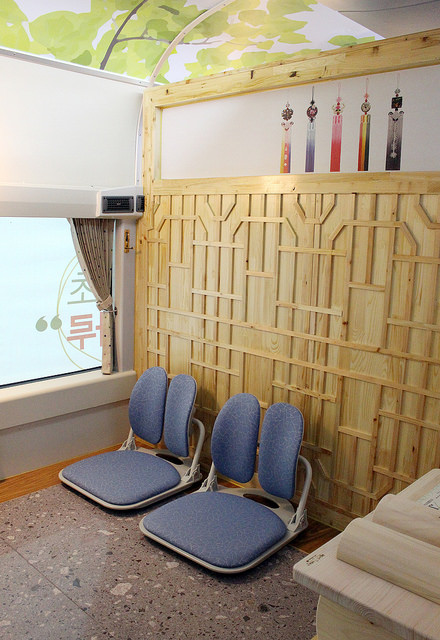
G-Train interior

== Operations ==
- Started running: February 5, 2015
- Stations: Yongsan Station - Yeongdeungpo Station - Suwon Station - Asan Station - Onyangoncheon Station - Yesan Station - Hongseong Station - Gwangcheon Station - Daecheon Station - Janghang Station - Gunsan Station - Iksan Station
