= Imseong-ri station =

Railway station in South Korea

임성리
Imseong-ri
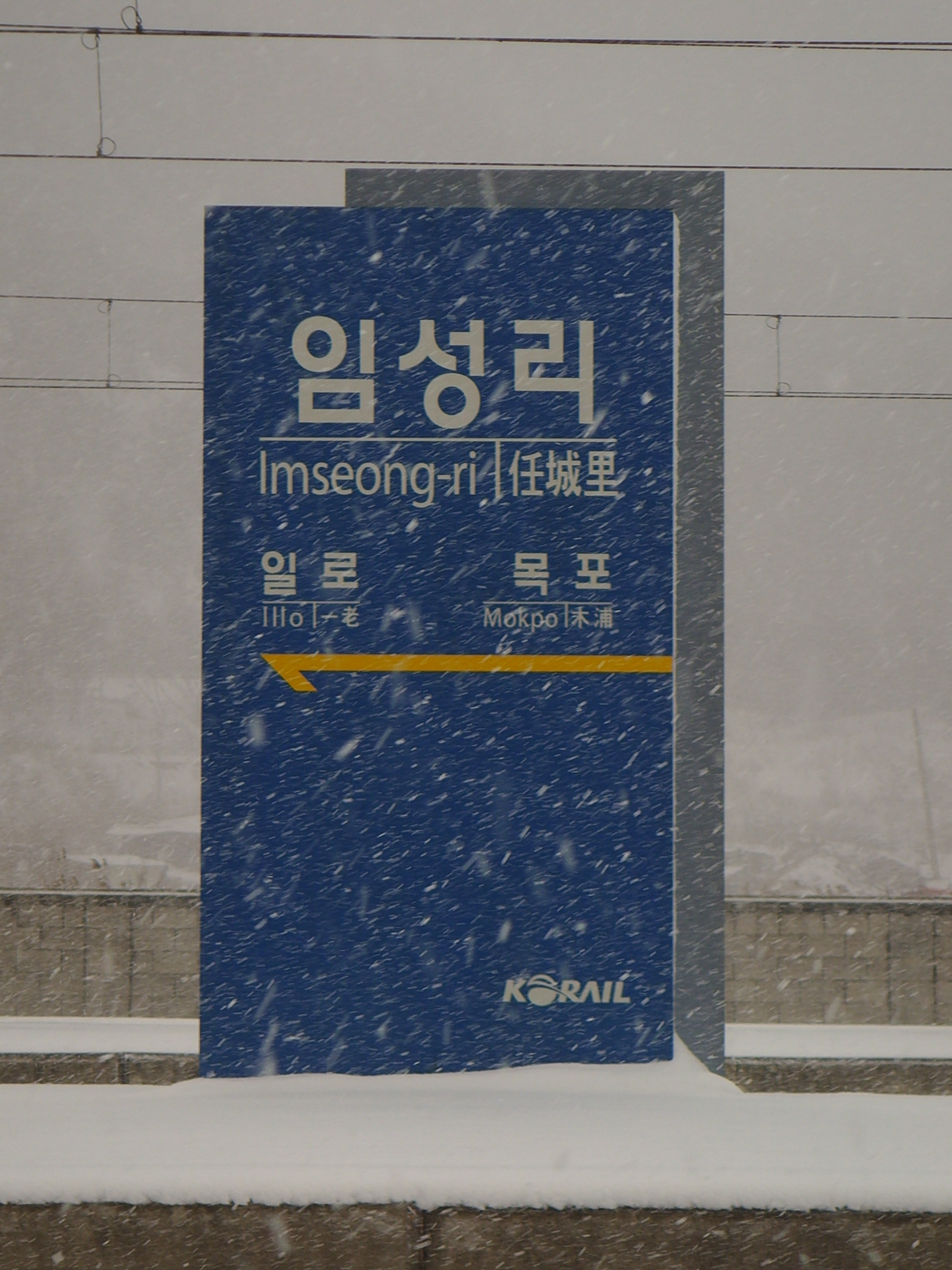
- Station stand

General information
- Location: South Korea
- Coordinates: 34.8204°N 126.4354°E
- Operator: Korail
- Line: Honam Line

Construction
- Structure type: Aboveground

History
- Opened: May 15, 1913
Location
- Location within South Korea

Imseong-ri Station is a South Korean railway station on the Honam Line.
