= Jangseong station =

Railway station in South Korea

장성
Jangseong

Korean name
- Hangul: 장성역
- Hanja: 長城驛
- Revised Romanization: Jangseongnyeok
- McCune–Reischauer: Changsŏngnyŏk

General information
- Location: Yeongcheon-ri, Jangseong-eup, Jangseong, South Jeolla; South Korea
- Coordinates: 35°18′0.41″N 126°46′46.62″E
- Operator: Korail
- Line: Honam Line
- Platforms: 2
- Tracks: 4

Construction
- Structure type: Aboveground

History
- Opened: January 14, 1914
Location

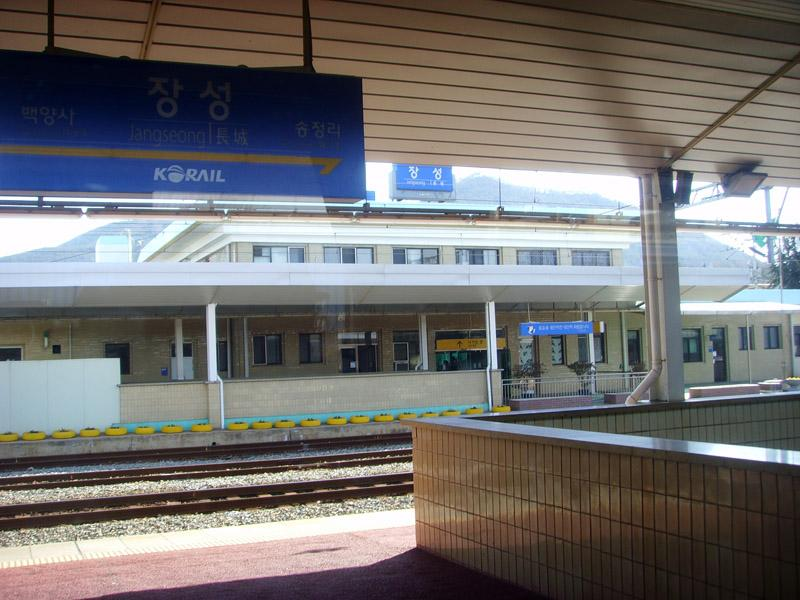
Station sign

Jangseong station is a KTX station in Jangseong County, South Korea. It is on the Honam Line.
