= Gimje station =

Railway station in Gimje, South Korea

김제
Gimje
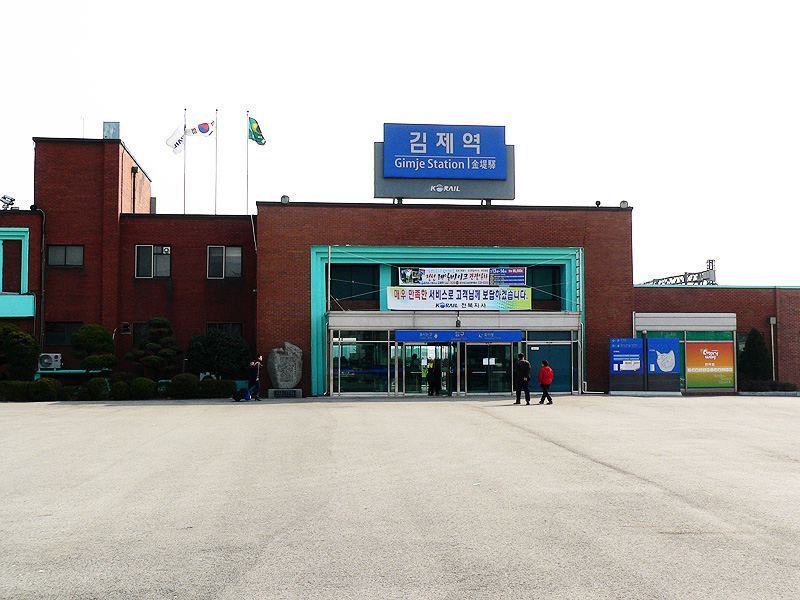

Korean name
- Hangul: 김제역
- Hanja: 金堤驛
- Revised Romanization: Gimjeyeok
- McCune–Reischauer: Kimjeyŏk

General information
- Location: Sinpung-dong, Gimje, North Jeolla; South Korea
- Coordinates: 35°47′36.61″N 126°54′19.57″E
- Operator: Korail
- Line: Honam Line

Construction
- Structure type: Aboveground

History
- Opened: January 11, 1912
Location

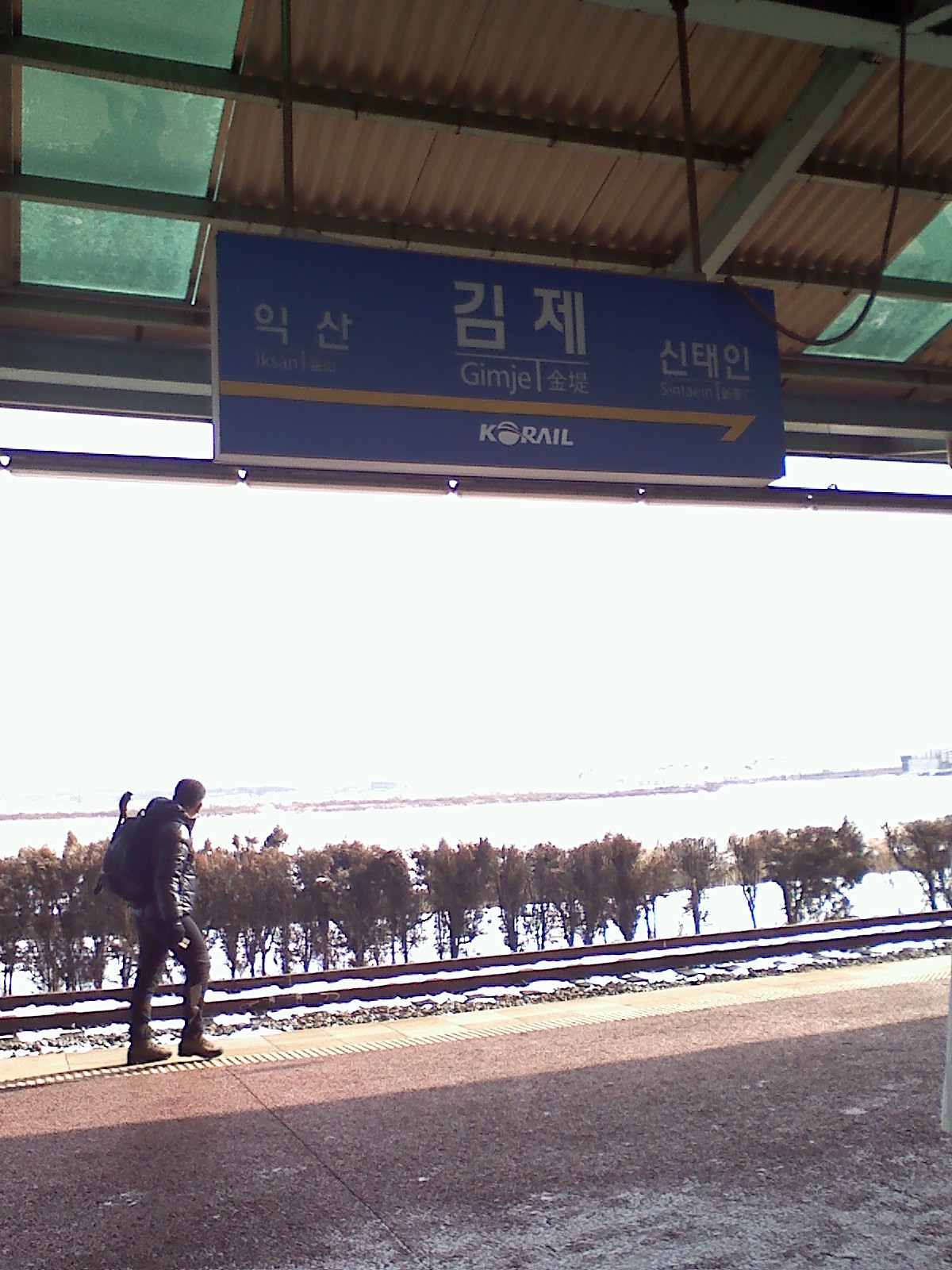
Station sign

Gimje station is a KTX station in the city of Gimje. It is on the Honam Line.
