= Daejeonjochajang station =

Railway station in South Korea

Coordinates: 36°22′16″N 127°25′21″E

대전조차장
Daejeonjochajang
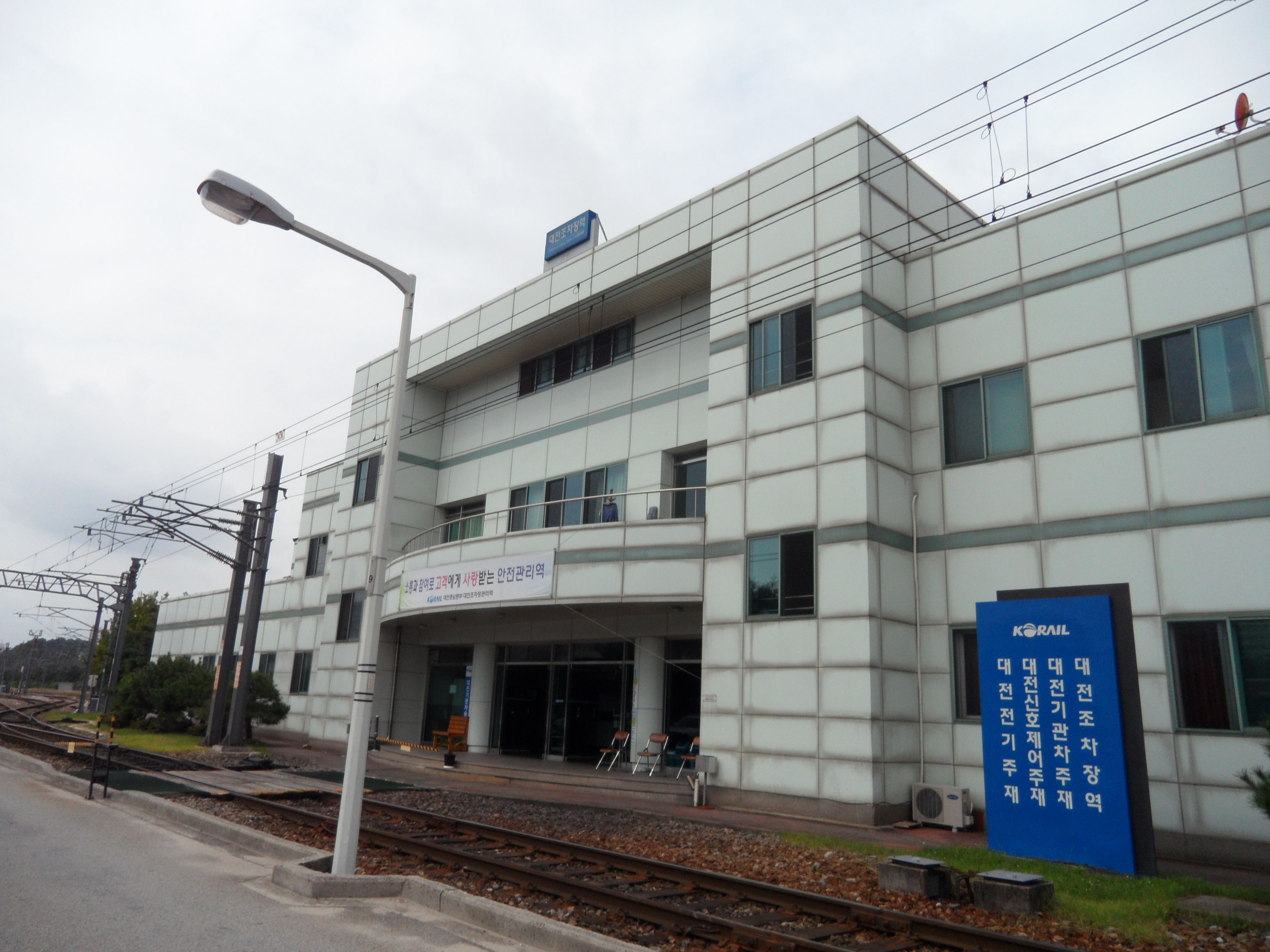

Korean name
- Hangul: 대전조차장역
- Hanja: 大田操車場驛
- Revised Romanization: Daejeonjochajang-yeok
- McCune–Reischauer: Taejŏnjoch'ajang-yŏk

General information
- Location: 166 Arirang-ro, Daedeok-gu, Daejeon (Eupnae-dong)
- Platforms: 0
- Tracks: 0

History
- Opened: January 10, 1978
Location

Daejeonjochajang station is a railway station on the Gyeongbu Line and Honam Line in Eupnae-dong, Daedeok-gu, Daejeon, and is the starting point of the Honam lines. The Honam lines branch from the Gyeongbu line. Passenger trains pass without stopping.

It is a management station of the Daejeon Chungnam headquarters of the Korea Railroad Corporation, and the station is divided into Sangseon-gun (群) and Haseon-gun (群), and plays the role of cargo management, train construction, vehicle entry, and train operation.
