= Mokpo station =

Train station in South Korea

Coordinates: 34°47′31.13″N 126°23′14.31″E

목포
Mokpo

Korean name
- Hangul: 목포역
- Hanja: 木浦驛
- Revised Romanization: Mokpo-yeok
- McCune–Reischauer: Mokp'o-yŏk

General information
- Location: Honam-dong, Mokpo-si, Jeollanam-do; South Korea
- Operator: Korail
- Line: Honam Line
- Platforms: 4
- Tracks: 4

Construction
- Structure type: Aboveground

History
- Opened: May 15, 1913
Services
Preceding station	Korea Train Express	Following station
Naju towards Haengsin or Suseo	Honam KTX	Terminus
Preceding station	Korail	Following station
Illo towards Yongsan	ITX-Saemaeul Honam Line	Terminus
Illo towards Yongsan	ITX-Maum Honam Line	Terminus
Terminus	Saemaeul-ho Mokpo–Boseong Line	Yeongam towards Bujeon
Imseong-ri towards Suncheon	Mugunghwa-ho Mokpo–Boseong Line	Terminus
Illo towards Yongsan	Mugunghwa-ho Honam Line	Terminus
Imseong-ri towards Gwangju	Mugunghwa-ho Honam Line	Terminus
Yeongam towards Busan	S-Train East	Terminus
Location

Mokpo station is a station on the Honam Line in Mokpo, South Jeolla Province. It is the westernmost railway station in South Korea. This station is the last stop on the Honam Line. Being located in the southwestern part of the Korean peninsula, it is used by customers who visit Jeju Island, Heuksan Island, and Hong Island in connection with KTX.
