= Yongsan station =

Station of the Seoul Metropolitan Subway

Coordinates: 37°31′48″N 126°57′53″E

용산
Yongsan
용산; Yongsan
용산; Yongsan
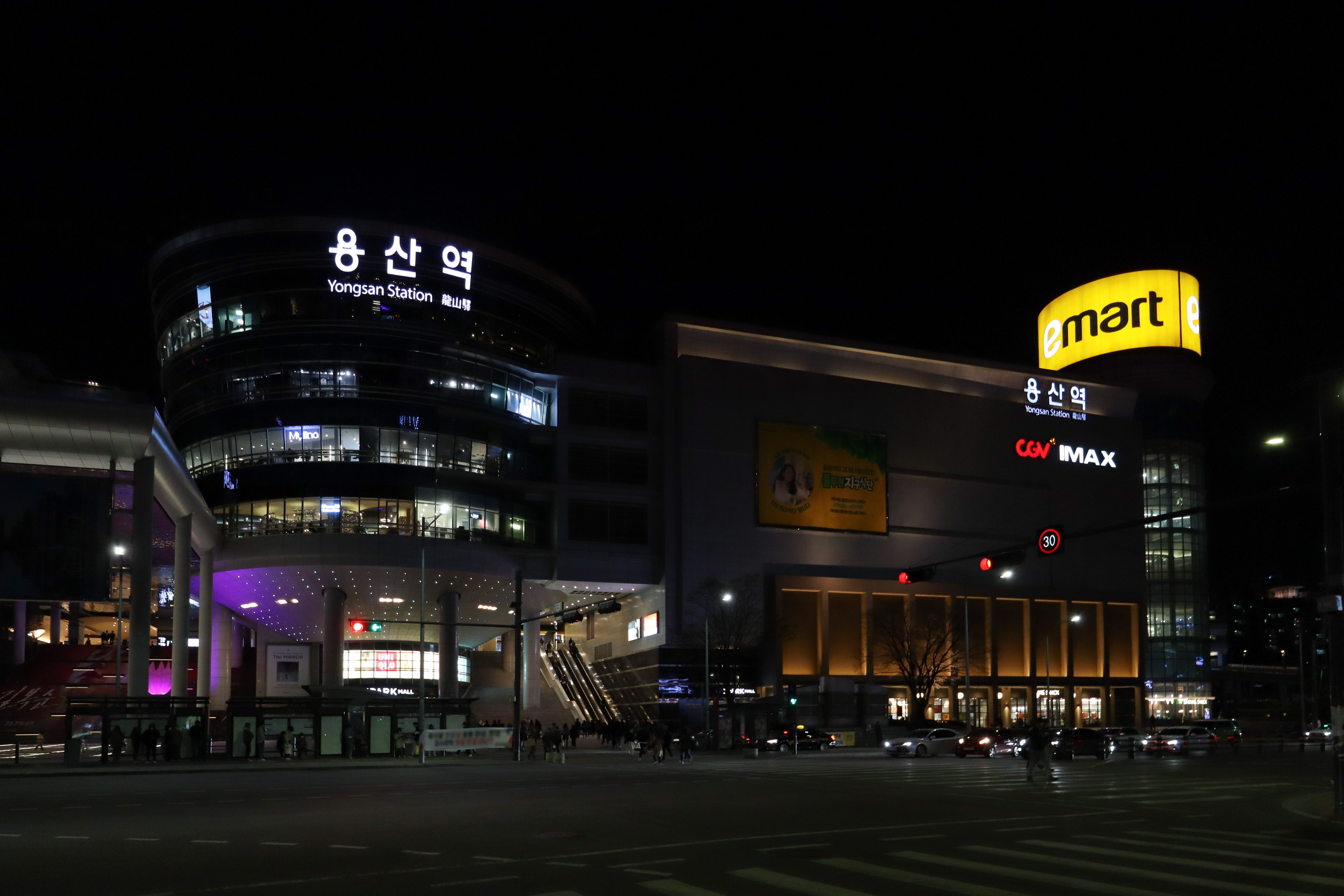

Korean name
- Hangul: 용산역
- Hanja: 龍山驛
- RR: Yongsan-yeok
- MR: Yongsan-yŏk

General information
- Location: 40-1 Hangangno 3-ga, 55 Hangang-daero 23 gil, Yongsan-gu, Seoul
- Operator: Korail
- Lines: Gyeongbu Line; Gyeongwon Line
- Platforms: 6
- Tracks: 13

Construction
- Structure type: Aboveground

History
- Opened: July 8, 1900

Key dates
- August 15, 1974: Line 1 opened
- December 16, 2005: Gyeongui–Jungang Line started service

Passengers
- (Daily) Based on Jan-Dec 2012. KR: 29,689; Line 1: 66,823
Services
Preceding station	Seoul Metropolitan Subway	Following station
Namyeong towards Kwangwoon University or Yeoncheon	Line 1	Noryangjin towards Incheon, Seodongtan or Sinchang
Namyeong towards Dongducheon	Line 1 Gyeongwon Express	Noryangjin towards Incheon
Terminus	Line 1 Gyeongin Express	Noryangjin towards Dongincheon
Namyeong towards Cheongnyangni	Line 1 Gyeongbu Express	Noryangjin towards Sinchang
Hyochang Park towards Munsan	Gyeongui–Jungang Line	Ichon towards Jipyeong
Hyochang Park towards Munsan	Gyeongui–Jungang Line Jungang Express	Ichon towards Yongmun
Gongdeok towards Munsan	Gyeongui–Jungang Line Gyeongui Express	Ichon towards Yongmun
Preceding station	Korea Train Express	Following station
Seoul towards Haengsin	Honam KTX	Yeongdeungpo towards Mokpo
Seoul towards Haengsin	Honam KTX	Gwangmyeong towards Mokpo
Seoul towards Haengsin	Jeolla KTX	Yeongdeungpo towards Yeosu-Expo
Terminus	Jeolla KTX	Gwangmyeong towards Yeosu-Expo
Preceding station	Korail	Following station
Terminus	ITX-Cheongchun	Oksu towards Chuncheon
Terminus	ITX-Saemaeul Honam Line	Yeongdeungpo towards Mokpo
Terminus	ITX-Saemaeul Gwangju Line	Yeongdeungpo towards Gwangju
Terminus	ITX-Saemaeul Jeolla Line	Yeongdeungpo towards Yeosu-Expo
Terminus	ITX-Maum Honam Line	Yeongdeungpo towards Mokpo
Terminus	ITX-Maum Jeolla Line	Yeongdeungpo towards Yeosu-Expo
Terminus	ITX-Maum Janghang Line	Yeongdeungpo towards Hongseong
Terminus	Saemaeul-ho Janghang Line	Yeongdeungpo towards Iksan
Terminus	Mugunghwa-ho Honam Line	Yeongdeungpo towards Gwangju or Mokpo
Terminus	Mugunghwa-ho Janghang Line	Yeongdeungpo towards Iksan
Terminus	Mugunghwa-ho Jeolla Line	Yeongdeungpo towards Yeosu-Expo
Terminus	G-Train	Yeongdeungpo towards Iksan
Seoul Terminus	Chungbuk Yeongdong Gugak Wine Train	Yeongdeungpo towards Yeongdong
Location

Yongsan station (Korean: 용산역) is a major railway station in the Yongsan District of Seoul, South Korea. The station adjoins the Yongsan Electronics Market. The station is the terminus for high-speed and long-distance trains on a number of railway lines, including most trains on the Honam Line, its high-speed counterpart, and all trains on the Janghang and Jeolla Lines.

Prior to 2004, all long-distance trains serving Seoul terminated at the nearby Seoul Station, but with the opening of the Korea Train Express (KTX), Yongsan took over some of Seoul's services. On February 28, 2012, ITX-Cheongchun trains began service between this station and Chuncheon station on the Gyeongchun Line. Yongsan is also served by metro rail on Line 1 and the Gyeongui–Jungang Line on the Seoul Metropolitan Subway.

The station is scheduled to become a transfer station with the Shinbundang Line in 2027. Once the Shinbundang Line station at Yongsan becomes operational, Yongsan will become connected with Sinyongsan on Line 4.

== Station layout ==
Yongsan has six elevated island platforms and one side platform serving 13 tracks.

=== Platforms ===
↑ Namyeong
| 1312 | | | 109 | | 8 7 | | 6 | | 5 4 | | 32 | | 1
↓ Noryangjin Ichon ↓

Platform No.	Line	Train	Destination	Other
1	●Gyeongui–Jungang Line	Express·Local	For Wangsimni·Cheongnyangni·Guri·Deokso·Yangpyeong·Jipyeong	
1	Gyeongwon Line	ITX-Cheongchun	For Cheongnyangni·Gapyeong·Chuncheon	
2	●Gyeongui–Jungang Line	Express·Local	For Digital Media City·Ilsan·Munsan	
2	Gyeongwon Line	ITX-Cheongchun	Terminates at the station	
3	●Gyeongin Line	Express	For Guro·Dongincheon	
4	●Gyeongin Line	Express	Terminates at the station	
5	●Gyeongbu Line	Local·Express	For Incheon·Seodongtan·Cheonan·Sinchang	
6	●Gyeongbu Line	Local·Express	For Seoul Station·Cheongnyangni·Uijeongbu·Soyosan	
7·8	Honam Line·Jeolla Line·Janghang Line	Saemaeul-ho·ITX-Saemaeul·Nuriro·Mugunghwa-ho	For Gwangju·Mokpo·Yeosu Expo·Iksan	
9·10	Honam Line·Jeolla Line	KTX	For Seodaejeon·GwangjuSongjeong·Mokpo·Yeosu Expo	
12·13	Gyeongbu Line·Honam Line·Jeolla Line·Janghang Line	KTX·Saemaeul-ho·Nuriro·Mugunghwa-ho·ITX-Saemaeul	For Seoul·Haengsin	Some trains terminate

== Gallery ==
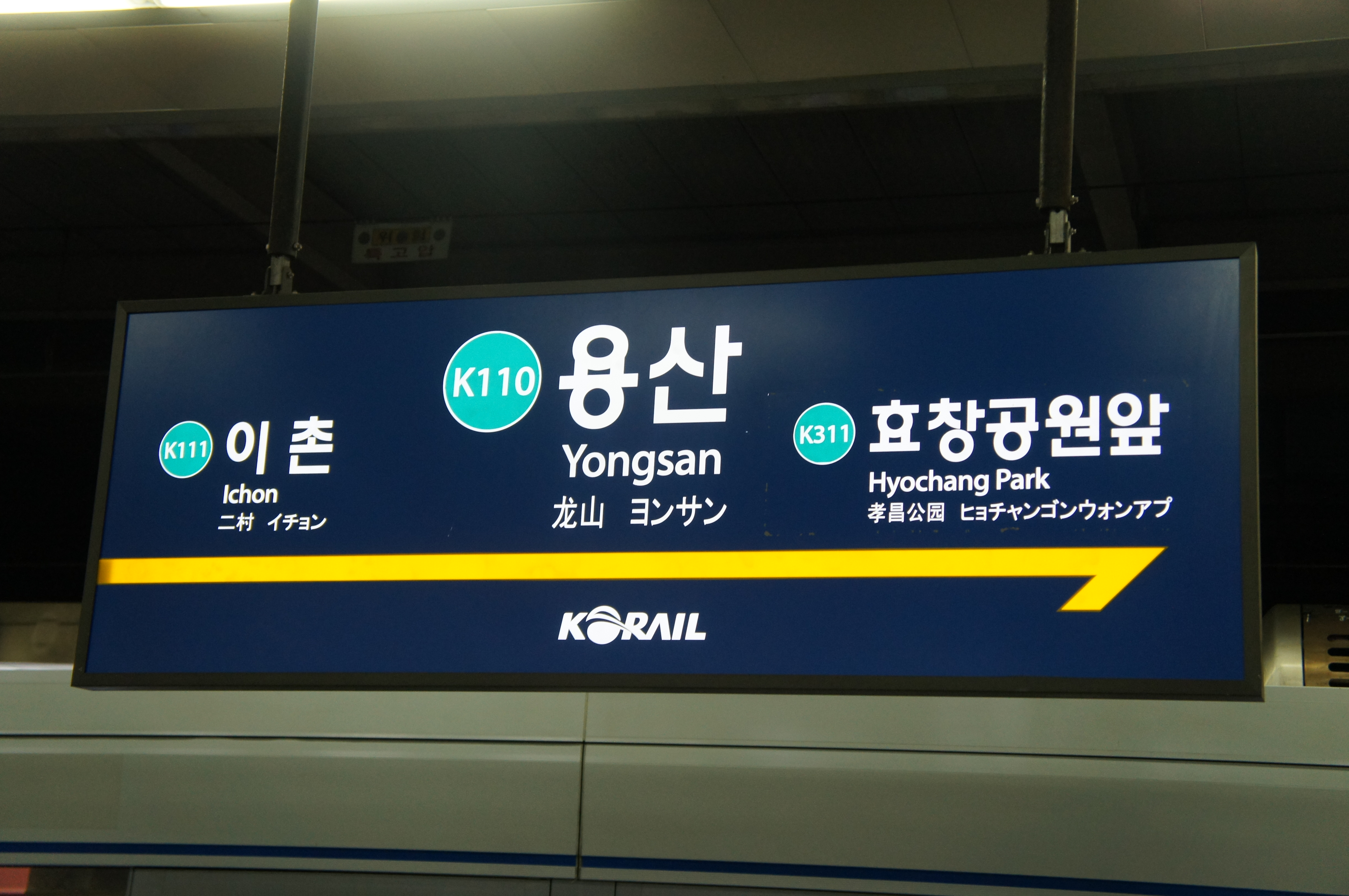
Station Sign (Gyeongui–Jungang Line)

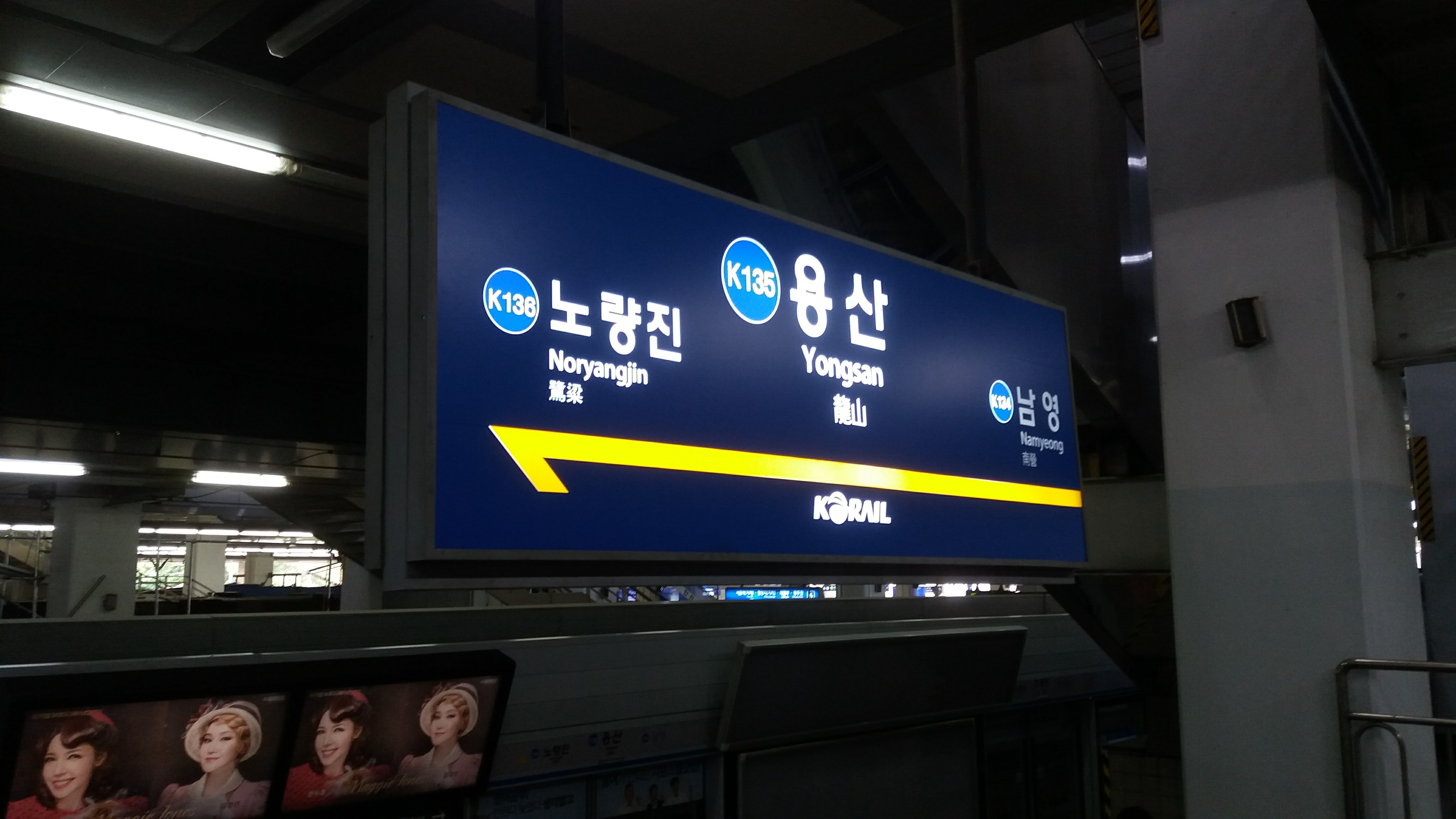
Station Sign (Line 1)

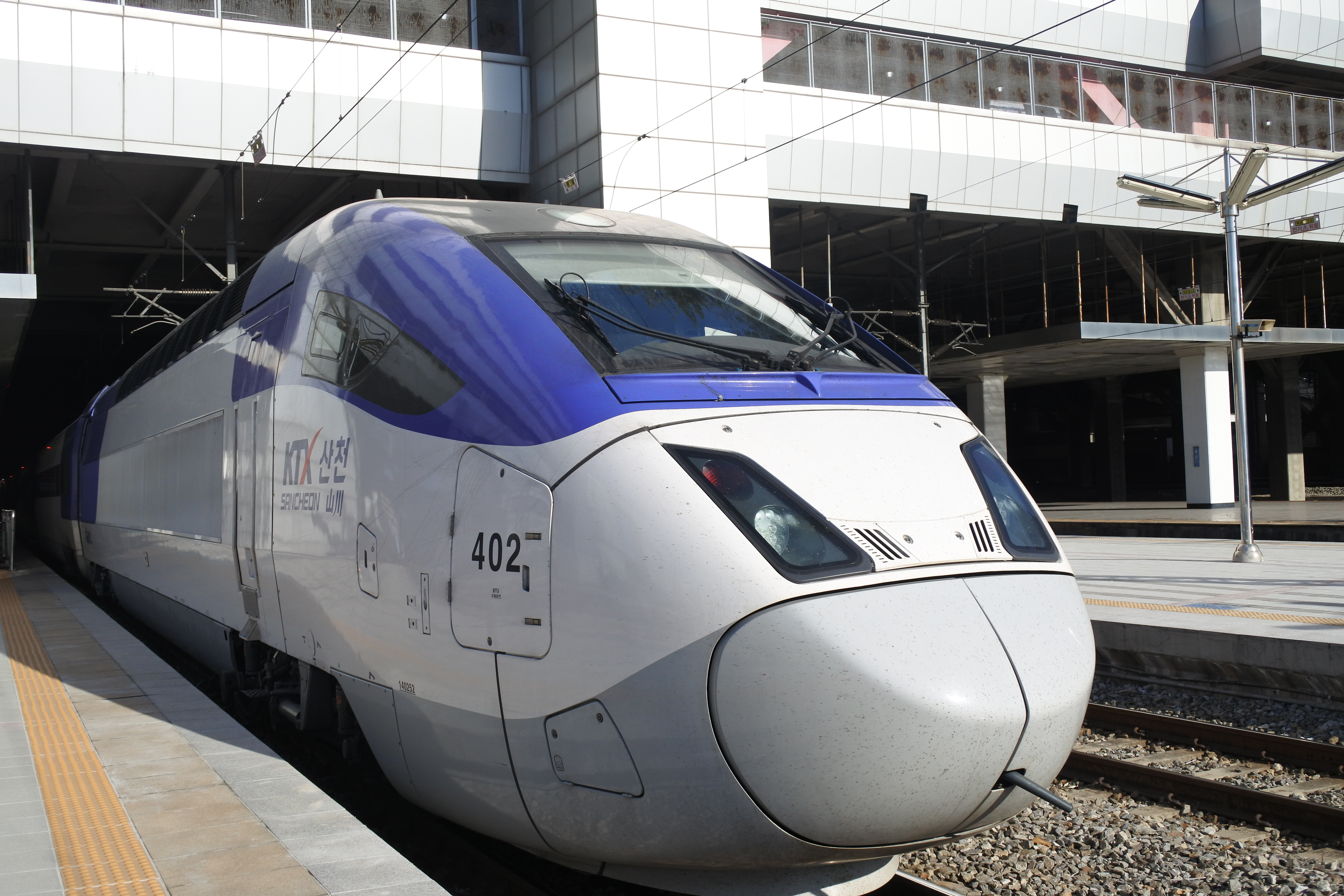
KTX Sancheon at Yongsan

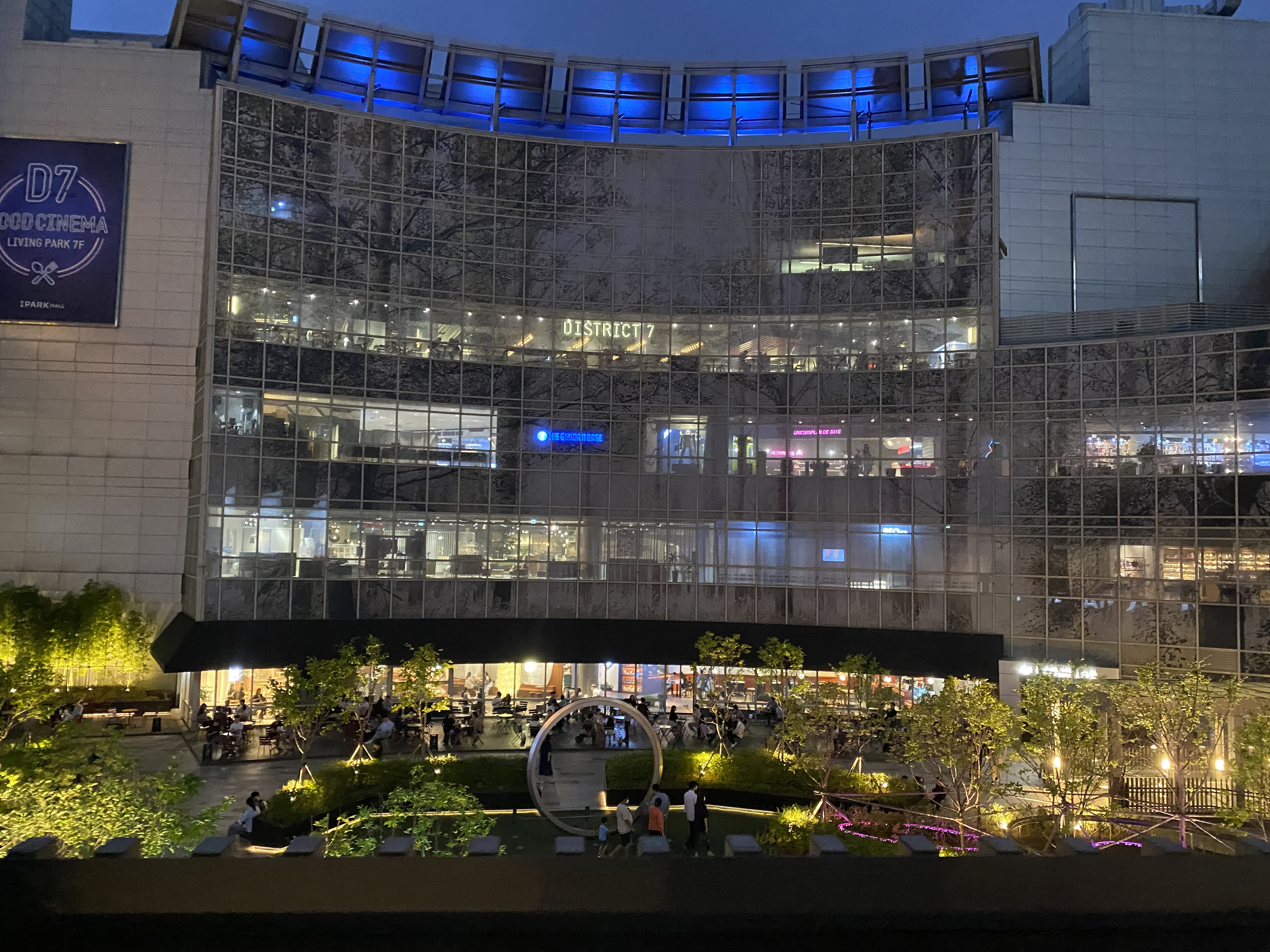
Yongsan's shopping area at night

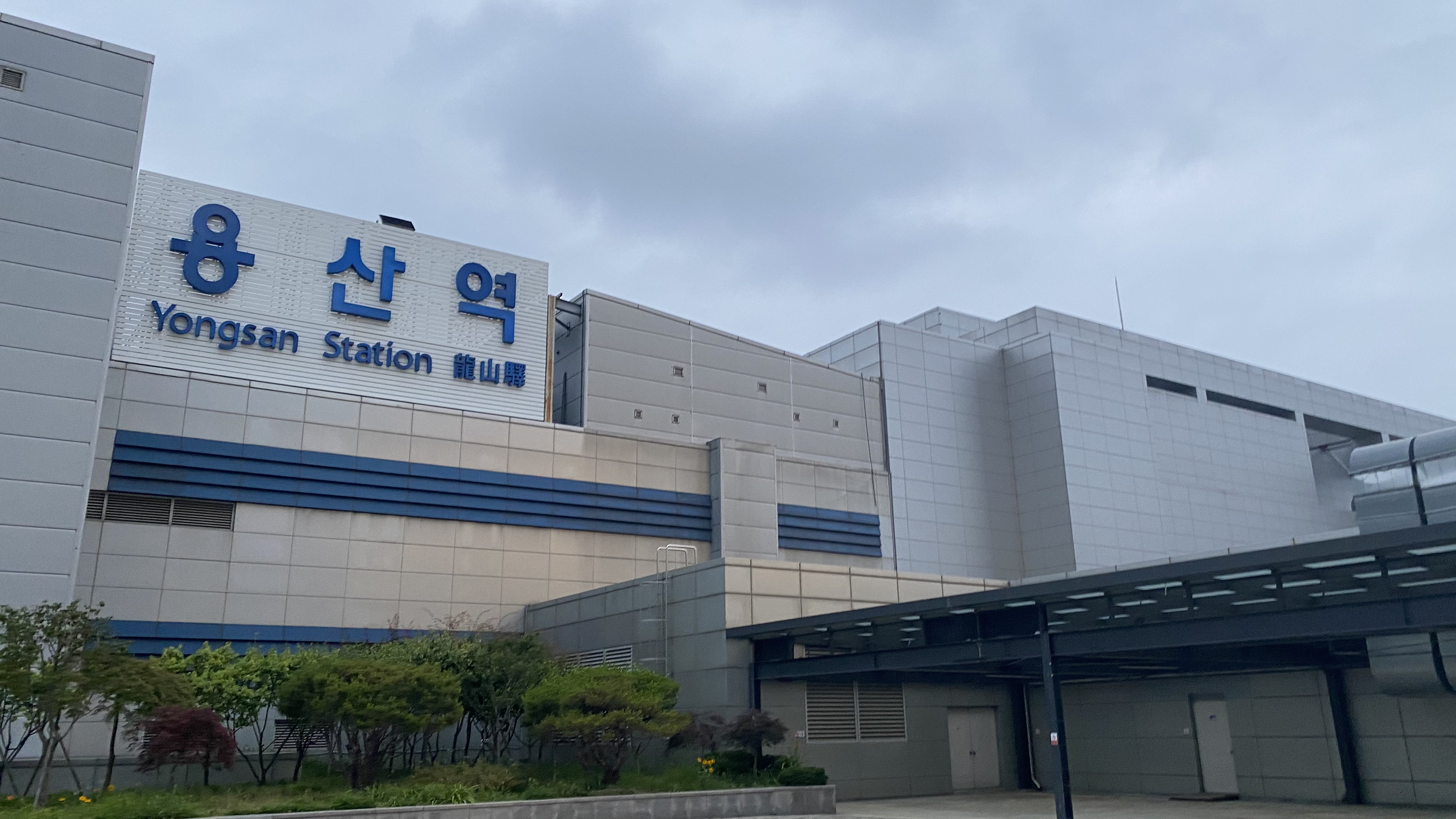
Yongsan's rear sign

== See also ==
- Transportation in South Korea
- Korail
- Korea Train Express
- Yongsan bombing
