= Haengsin station =

Metro station in Goyang, South Korea

행신
Haengsin
행신; Haengsin
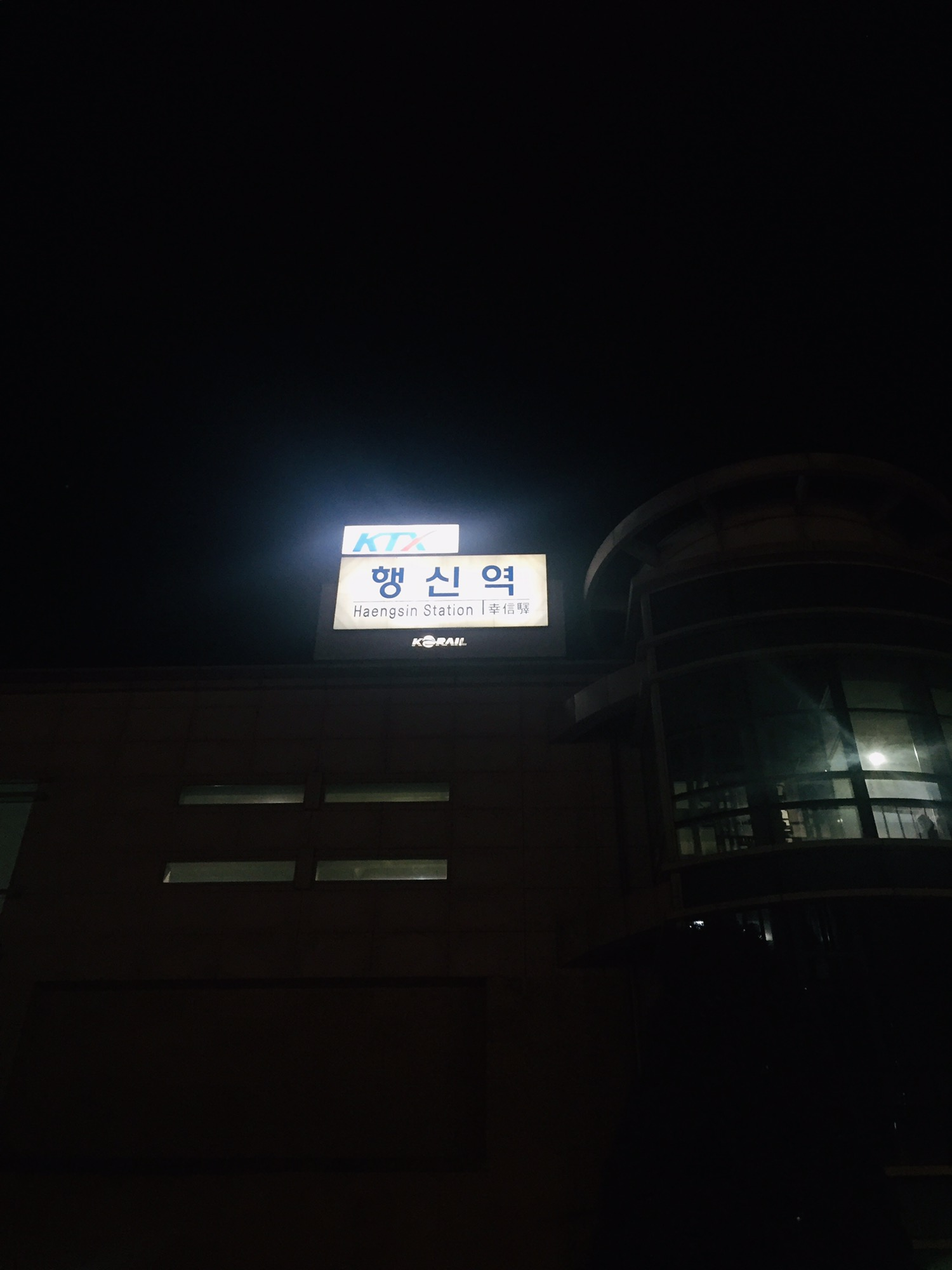
- Station building (before remodeling)

Korean name
- Hangul: 행신역
- Hanja: 幸信驛
- Revised Romanization: Haengsinnyeok
- McCune–Reischauer: Haengsinnyŏk

General information
- Location: 802 Haengsin 2-dong Deogyang-gu, Goyang; Gyeonggi-do
- Coordinates: 37°36′44″N 126°50′02″E
- Operator: Korail
- Line: Gyeongui–Jungang Line
- Platforms: 4 (2 island platforms)
- Tracks: 4
- Bus routes: 11 97 850

Construction
- Structure type: Above ground

History
- Opened: April 1, 1996

Key dates
- July 1, 2009: Gyeongui–Jungang Line started service
Services
Preceding station	Seoul Metropolitan Subway	Following station
Neunggok towards Munsan	Gyeongui–Jungang Line	Gangmae towards Jipyeong or Seoul Station
Daegok towards Munsan	Gyeongui–Jungang Line Gyeongui Express	Digital Media City towards Yongmun
Neunggok towards Munsan	Gyeongui–Jungang Line Jungang Express	Gangmae towards Yongmun
Daegok towards Munsan	Gyeongui–Jungang Line Gyeongui Express	Digital Media City towards Seoul Station
Preceding station	Korea Train Express	Following station
Terminus	Donghae KTX	Seoul towards Pohang
Terminus	Gyeongbu KTX	Seoul towards Busan
Terminus	Gyeongjeon KTX	Seoul towards Jinju
Terminus	Honam KTX	Seoul towards Mokpo
Terminus	Jeolla KTX	Seoul towards Yeosu-Expo
Terminus	Gangneung KTX	Seoul towards Gangneung
Location

Haengsin station is a station on the Gyeongui–Jungang Line. The KTX Goyang Train Depot is located behind this station, and some KTX trains serve passengers at this station. In 2021, Haengsin station was renovated to make the transfer between the Gyeongui–Jungang Line and the KTX more convenient.

== Station layout ==
Haengsin station has 4 platforms for Gyeongui–Jungang Line and one 2 island platform serving KTX.

=== Platforms ===
↑ Neunggok·Daegok Seoul·Yongsan ↑
| 1 2 | | | 3 4 | | KTX | |
↓ Gangmae·Digital Media City Terminus

Platform No.	Line	Train	Destination	Other
1	●Gyeongui–Jungang Line	Express·Local	For Munsan	
2	●Gyeongui–Jungang Line	—N/a		
3	●Gyeongui–Jungang Line	—N/a		
4	●Gyeongui–Jungang Line	Express·Local	For Jipyeong·Seoul·Yongmun	
KTX		Gyeongbu KTX; Honam KTX; Jeolla KTX; Gyeongjeon KTX; Donghae KTX	For Busan·GwangjuSongjeong·Mokpo·Yeosu Expo·Jinju·Pohang	

== Gallery ==
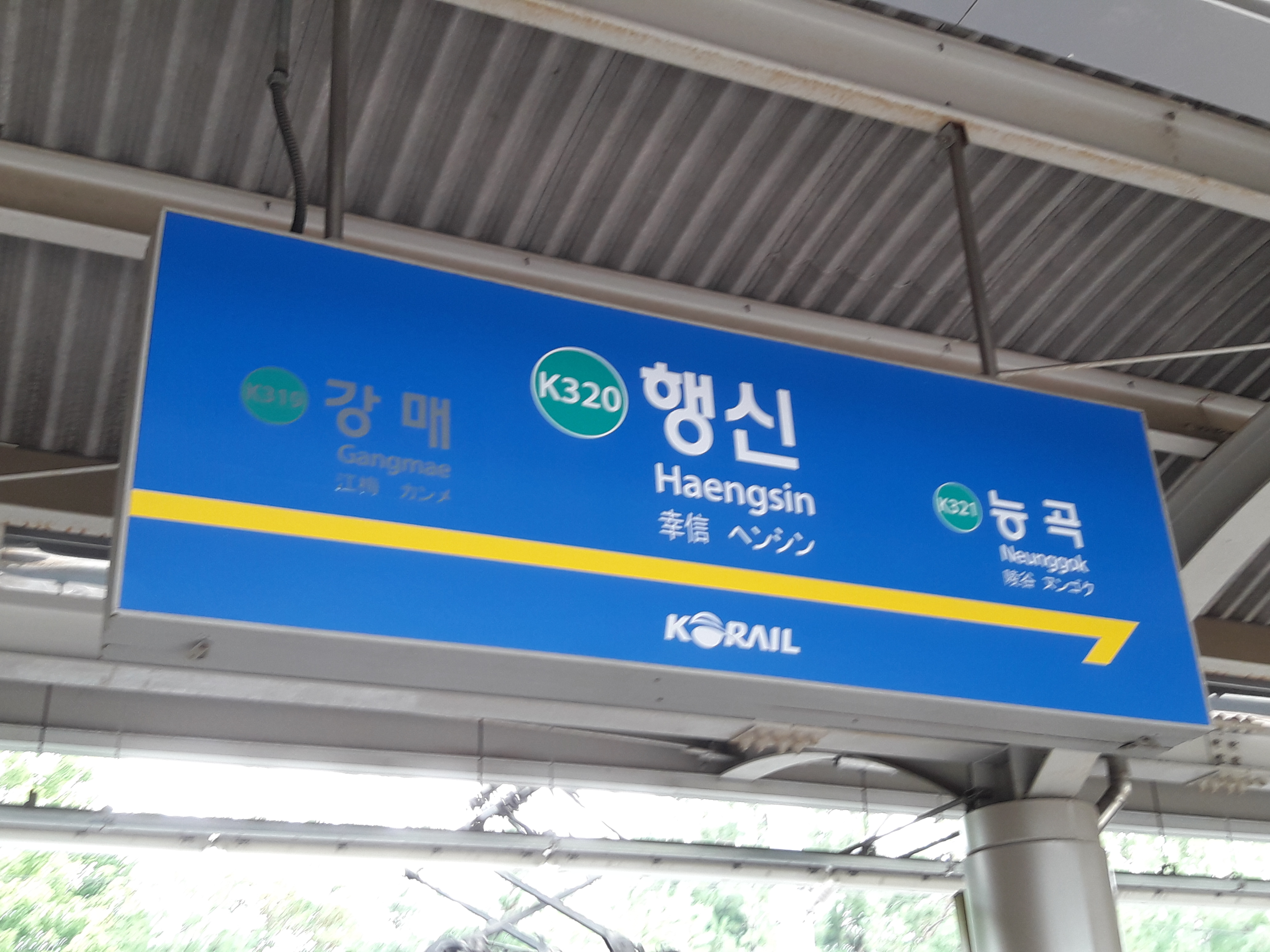
Station nameplate
