= Honam Line =

Railway line in South Korea

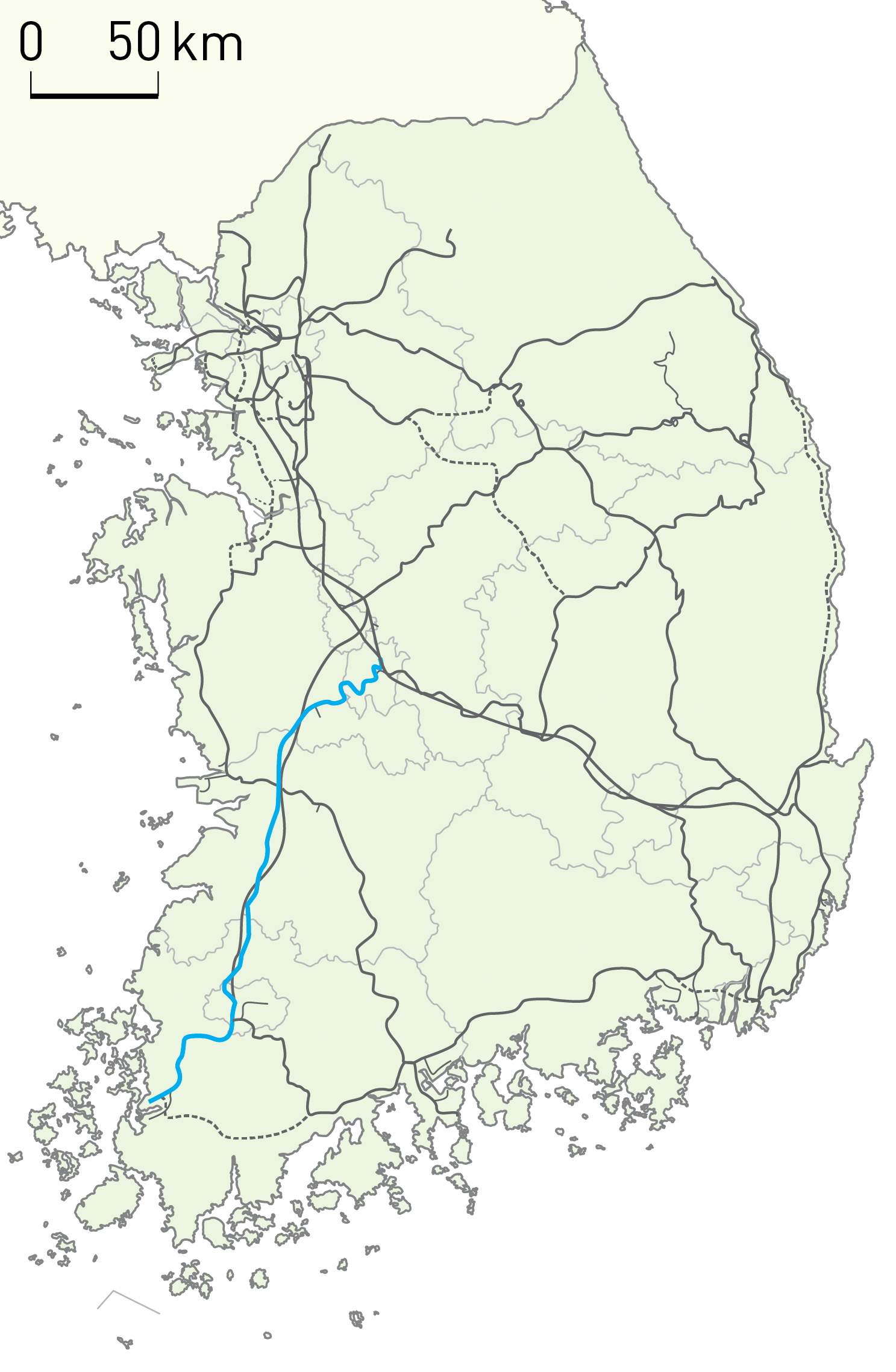

Overview
- Native name: 호남선(湖南線)
- Status: Operational
- Owner: Korea Rail Network Authority
- Locale: Daejeon; South Chungcheong; North Jeolla; South Jeolla; Gwangju
- Termini: Daejeonjochajang; Mokpo
- Stations: 48

Service
- Type: Heavy Rail, Passenger/freight rail Regional rail, Intercity rail
- Operator: Korail

History
- Opened: Stages between 1911 and 1914

Technical
- Line length: 252.5 km (156.9 mi)
- Num of tracks: Double track
- Track gauge: 1,435 mm (4 ft 8 1/2 in) standard gauge
- Electrification: 25 kV/60 Hz AC catenary

- Honam Line
- Hangul: 호남선
- Hanja: 湖南線
- RR: Honamseon
- MR: Honamsŏn

The Honam Line is a major railway line serving the Honam region (North and South Jeolla Provinces) in South Korea. The line is served by frequent passenger trains from Seoul (via the Gyeongbu Line) to Gwangju and Mokpo.

== History ==
A Honam Railway from Seoul to Mokpo was first proposed in 1896 by a French company. After the start of the Russo-Japanese War, in May 1904, Imperial Japan forced Korea to sign an agreement granting the Japanese military control over railways, including the right to seize land. Japan then seized much of the fertile Honam plain in advance of a planned Honam Line.

The construction of the line started in 1910. The first 39.9 km (24.8 mi) between Daejeon and Yeonsan was opened in July 1911. The line was extended to Ganggyeong in November 1911, to Iri (today Iksan) in March 1912, to Gimje in October 1912 and to Jeongeup in December 1912. Construction continued from the other end of the line, with the section from Mokpo to Hakgyo (today Hampyeong) opened in May 1913; and extended to Naju in July 1913, to Songjeong-ri (today Gwangju·Songjeong) in October 1913, and finally to Jeongeup, completing the line on January 11, 1914.

=== Upgrade ===
==== Duplication ====
The Honam Line was upgraded to an electrified and double-tracked line for higher speeds in stages. The construction of the double track began on January 4, 1968. On March 30, 1978, the section from Daejeonjochajang station to Iksan station via Seodaejeon station was double-tracked. The double-track work for the section south of Iksan station on the Honam Line began in February 1981, and the double-track work was completed to Songjeong-ri station in Gwangju on September 6, 1988.

Double-tracking of the last remaining single-track section, Songjeong–Mokpo, and the electrification of the whole line, including the Gwangju spur, was finished for the start of Korea Train Express (KTX) services on April 1, 2004. The present line length from Daejeon to Mokpo is 252.5 km (156.9 mi), the line distance from Seoul to Mokpo is 407.6 km (253.3 mi).

==== Speeding-up upgrade ====
To serve KTX and SRT, section from GwangjuSongjeong to Gomagwon was upgraded to accomplish maximum speed of 230 km/h. Total length of the project is 25.9 km and it was completed in June 2020.

== Major stations ==
Major stations and junctions along the line include:

- Daejeon, junction with the Gyeongbu Line to Seoul and Busan;
- Seodaejeon, the Daejeon passenger station for Honam Line trains;
- Iksan (formerly named Iri), the terminus of the Jeolla and Janghang Lines;
- GwangjuSongjeong, the major station in Gwangju for through trains to Mokpo, and the junction with the Gyeongjeon Line;
- Naju, the major station in Naju;
- Mokpo, a seaport on the south coast.

== Services ==
The Honam Line is served by freight trains, as well as cross-country Mugunghwa-ho, intercity ITX-Saemaeul/MAUM and high-speed KTX passenger trains.

As of October 2024, the minimum travel time from Yongsan Station in Seoul to Mokpo in South Jeolla Province is at least 4 hours and 20 minutes for ITX-MAUM and at least 5 hours and 14 minutes for Mugunghwa. Even on the Honam Line from Seodaejeon to Mokpo itself, the travel time is at least 2 hours and 34 minutes for ITX-MAUM and at least 3 hours and 4 minutes for Mugunghwa.

== See also ==
- Transportation in South Korea
- Korail
