= Jeonju station =

Railway station in South Korea

Coordinates: 35.8498°N 127.1618°E

전주
Jeonju
- Station building

Korean name
- Hangul: 전주역
- Hanja: 全州驛
- Revised Romanization: Jeonju-yeok
- McCune–Reischauer: Chŏnju-yŏk

General information
- Location: Dongbu-daero 680, Deokjin-gu, Jeonju, North Jeolla; South Korea
- Operator: Korail
- Line: Jeolla Line
- Platforms: 3
- Tracks: 5

History
- Opened: November 17, 1914

Services
Preceding station	Korea Train Express	Following station
Iksan towards Haengsin, Suseo or Yongsan	Jeolla KTX	Namwon towards Yeosu-Expo
Preceding station	Korail	Following station
Iksan towards Yongsan	ITX-Saemaeul Jeolla Line	Namwon towards Yeosu-Expo
Iksan towards Yongsan	ITX-Maum Jeolla Line	Namwon towards Yeosu-Expo
Samnye towards Yongsan	Mugunghwa-ho Jeolla Line	Imsil towards Yeosu-Expo
Iksan towards Seoul	S-Train West	Imsil towards Yeosu-Expo
Location

Jeonju Station (Korean: 전주역; Hanja: 全州驛) is a railway station of Jeolla Line, located in Deokjin-gu, Jeonju, South Korea. KTX, ITX-Saemaeul, Mugunghwa-ho, S-Train stops at this station. Jeonju Station's feature is station built as Hanok style.

== Timeline ==
Date	Content
November 17, 1914	Operation started as ordinary station at Sangsaeng-ri, Idong-myeon, Jeonju-gun, North Jeolla
January 16, 1915	Rebuilt the station building
October 1, 1928	Railroad Bureau of Governor-General of Korea bought the station
September 20, 1929	Rebuild and Relocated the station to Nosong-ri, Idong-myeon, Jeonju-gun
January 11, 1930	Improved the gauge to standard gauge at section of Iri ~ Jeonju
April 1, 1972	Transferred from Daejeon Railroad bureau to Suncheon Railroad bureau
March 23, 1978	Rebuild and Relocated the station to present location, because of transfer of Jeolla Line's Jeonju section Built the underground platform passageway
May 25, 1981	Started new station building construction
May 1, 1993	Paid rest area operation started
July 1, 1995	Paid rest area closed
May 1, 2006	Small Cargo carrying stopped
November 1, 2008	Cargo transportation stopped
October 5, 2011	Double-track opened, and KTX began to stop
December 13, 2013	S-Train began to stop
June 1, 2014	ITX-Saemaeul began to stop

== Platform ==
Station have 3 platforms, 5 tracks, operating as binary side platform.

↑ Samnye
| 1 | | 23 | | 45 | | | | | |
Imsil ↓

1	Unused	Platform closed
2·3	Jeolla Line	For Haengsin · Incheon Int'l Airport · Yongsan · Yeongdeungpo · Anyang · Suwon · Pyeongtaek · Cheonan
4·5	Jeolla Line	For Namwon · Suncheon · Gokseong · Guryegu · Yeosu Expo
