= S-Train (Korail) =

Tourist train in South Korea

S-Train a.k.a. Namdo Sea Sightseeing Train
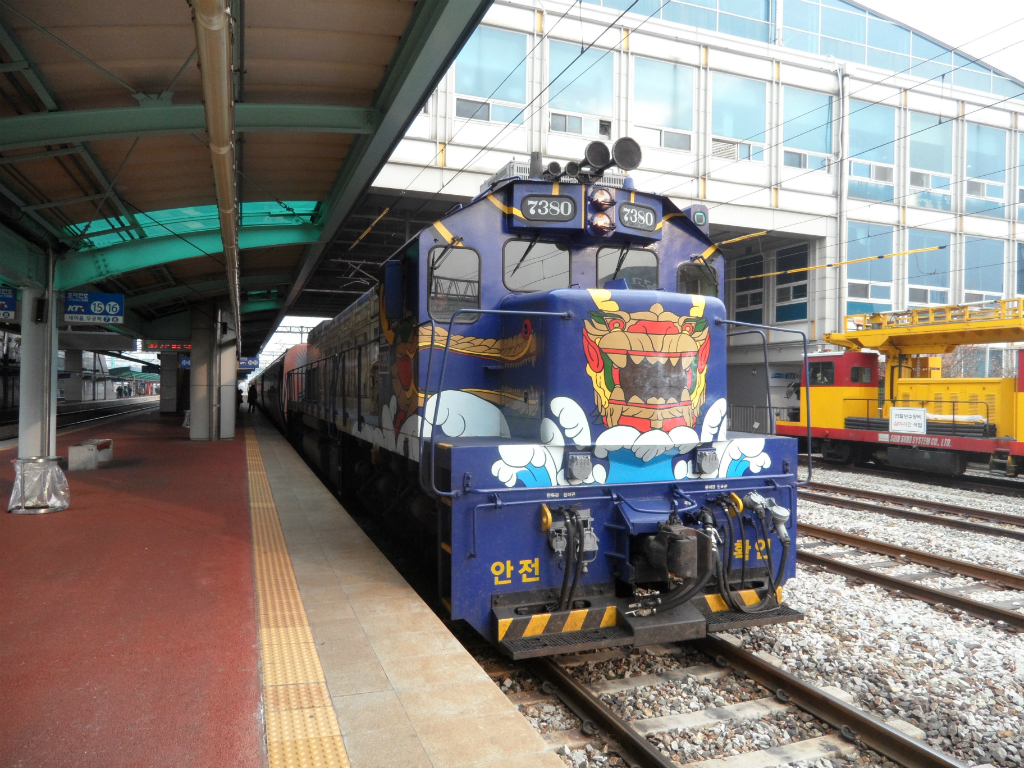

Overview
- Service type: Regional rail
- Status: Operational
- First service: September 27, 2013
- Current operator: Korail

Route
- Termini: Busan station Yeosu-Expo station Gwangju station Masan station
- Lines used: Gyeongbu Line; Gyeongjeon Line; Honam Line; Jeolla Line

S-Train (a.k.a. Namdo Sea Sightseeing Train (Korean: 남도해양관광열차)) is a South Korean tourist train operated by Korail. The train began operations in 2013 and transports tourists through southern South Korea.

== Overview ==
The train began running on September 27, 2013, and travels two routes, one from Busan to Yeosu in South Jeolla Province and another from Gwangju in South Jeolla Province to Masan in South Gyeongsang Province. The double routes operate at the same time from different directions and meet at the Hadong station in South Gyeongsang Province where passengers can transfer to the other train. One of the stops is Suncheon, with nearby Suncheon Bay, hosts of the 2013 Suncheon Garden Expo Korea.

The letter "S" in the name stems from "south", the S-shaped route along the curvy shape of the South Sea of Korea,"slow", "sea" and "sightseeing". The train is distinguished with its slow travel pace.

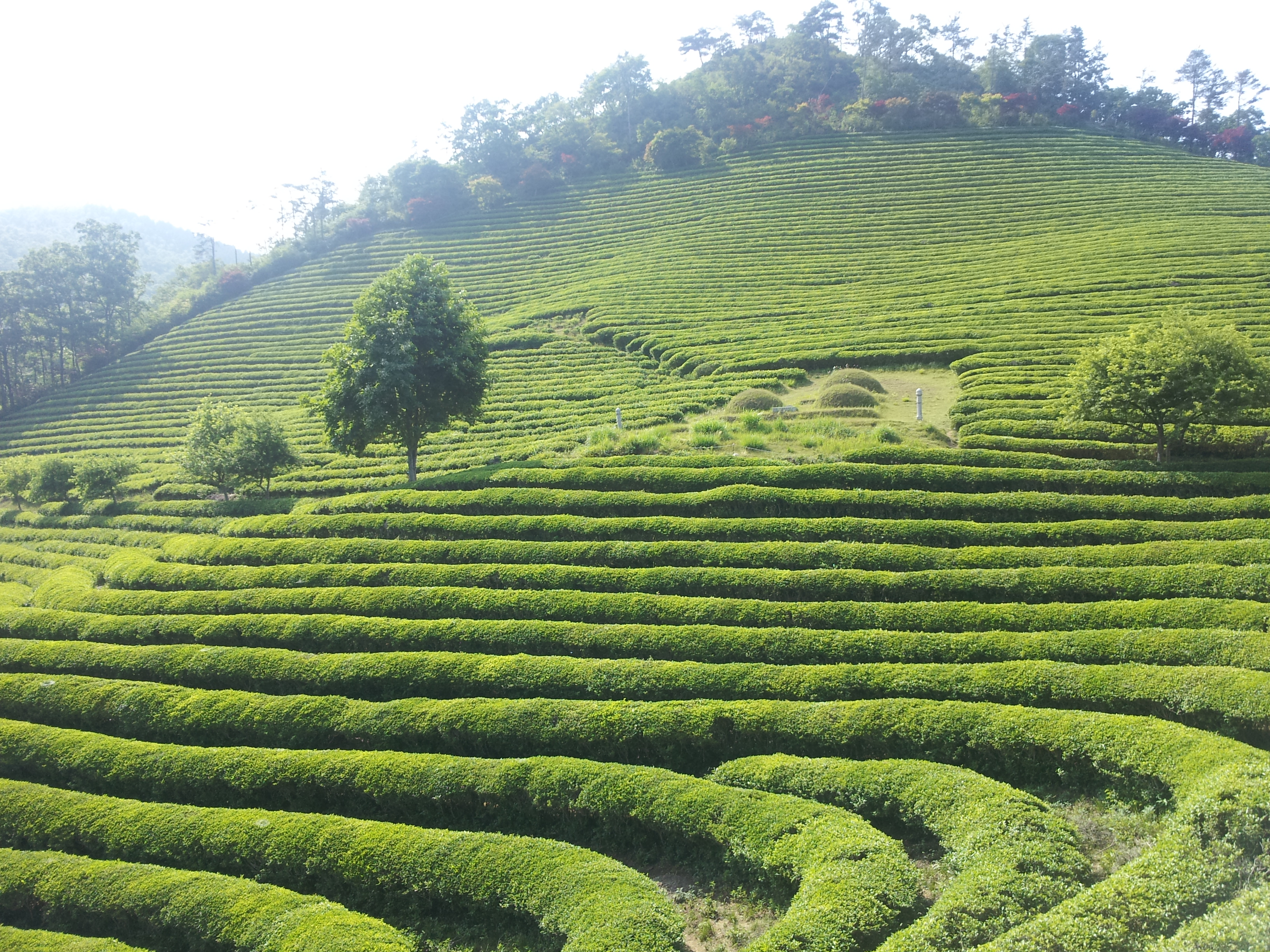
Boseong tea field

The train has five cars set up for different functions, including family occasions, tea drinking, party events, sports and leisure. Small spaces between cars are storage for bicycle riders. The traditional Korean tea ceremonies include a talk, and the tea served comes from the regions of Boseong and Hadong, which are among the train stops.

The exteriors are coloured in blue and pink, representing the ocean and the pink camellia flowers of the southern regions. The turtle-themed train, with the nose of the train painted like the head of a turtle, is a tribute to 16th century naval commander Yi Sun-shin, famous for his deploying of turtle-shaped warships.

In April 2014, the train was used by the pop duo TVXQ, for a fan trip, to celebrate both their ten-year anniversary and that of Korail's KTX rail system.

== Operations ==
- Seoul~Yeosu-Expo: Seoul Station - Yeongdeungpo station - Suwon station - Cheonan station - Seodaejeon station - Iksan station - Jeonju station - Namwon station - Gokseong Station - Guryegu Station - Suncheon station - Yeosu-Expo Station
- Busan~GwangjuSongjeong: Busan station - Gupo station - Mulgeum Station - Samnangjin Station - Jinyeong station - Changwonjungang station - Masan station - Jinju station - Bukcheon station - Hadong station - Gwangyang Station - Suncheon station - Beolgyo Station - Deungnyang Station - Boseong Station - Myeongbong Station - Neungju Station - Hwasun Station - Nampyeong Station - Hyocheon Station - Seogwangju Station - GwangjuSongjeong Station

- Approximate travel time: 5 hours 30 minutes.
