= Guryegu station =

Train station in South Korea

구례구
Guryegu

Korean name
- Hangul: 구례구역
- Hanja: 求禮口驛
- Revised Romanization: Guryegu-yeok
- McCune–Reischauer: Kuryegu-yŏk

General information
- Location: Suncheon, South Jeolla; South Korea
- Coordinates: 35°9′50.1″N 127°27′4.6″E
- Operator: Korail
- Line: Jeolla Line
- Platforms: 2
- Tracks: 4

Construction
- Structure type: Above ground

History
- Opened: December 16, 1936

Services
Preceding station	Korea Train Express	Following station
Gokseong towards Haengsin, Suseo or Yongsan	Jeolla KTX	Suncheon towards Yeosu-Expo
Preceding station	Korail	Following station
Gokseong towards Yongsan	ITX-Saemaeul Jeolla Line	Suncheon towards Yeosu-Expo
Gokseong towards Yongsan	ITX-Maum Jeolla Line	Suncheon towards Yeosu-Expo
Gokseong towards Yongsan	Mugunghwa-ho Jeolla Line	Suncheon towards Yeosu-Expo
Gokseong towards Seoul	S-Train West	Suncheon towards Yeosu-Expo
Location

Guryegu station (Korean: 구례구역) is a KTX station in the city of Suncheon, South Jeolla Province, on the southern coast of South Korea. It is on the Jeolla Line.
