= Namwon station =

Train station in South Korea

남원
Namwon
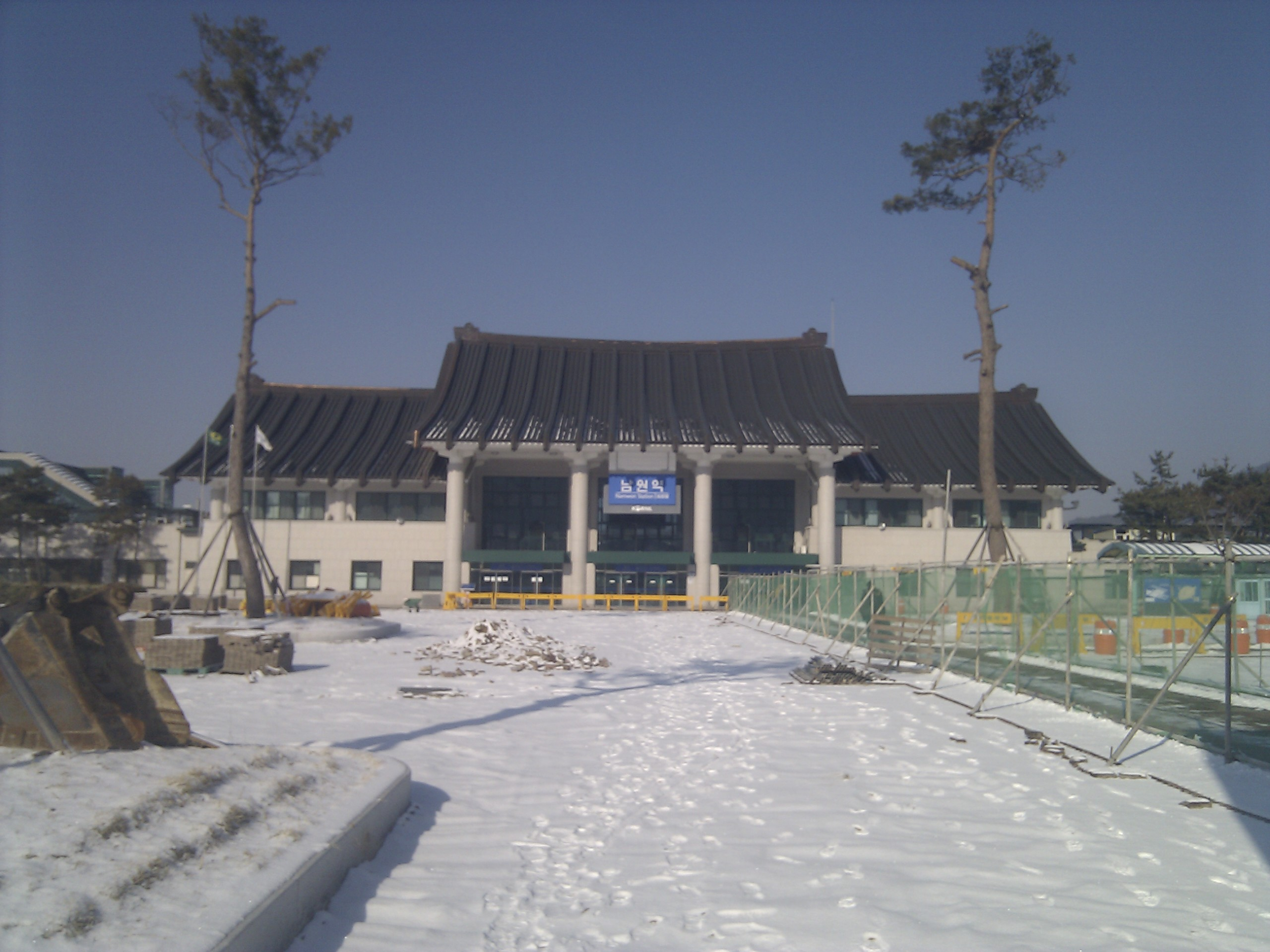

Korean name
- Hangul: 남원역
- Hanja: 南原驛
- Revised Romanization: Namwon-yeok
- McCune–Reischauer: Namwŏn-yŏk

General information
- Location: Namwon, North Jeolla; South Korea
- Coordinates: 35°24′40.33″N 127°21′42.55″E
- Operator: Korail
- Line: Jeolla Line
- Platforms: 2
- Tracks: 6

Construction
- Structure type: Aboveground

History
- Opened: October 15, 1933

Services
| Preceding station | Korea Train Express | Following station |
|---|---|---|
| Jeonju towards Haengsin, Suseo or Yongsan | Jeolla KTX | Gokseong towards Yeosu-Expo |
| Preceding station | Korail | Following station |
| Jeonju towards Yongsan | ITX-Saemaeul Jeolla Line | Gokseong towards Yeosu-Expo |
| Jeonju towards Yongsan | ITX-Maum Jeolla Line | Gokseong towards Yeosu-Expo |
| Osu towards Yongsan | Mugunghwa-ho Jeolla Line | Gokseong towards Yeosu-Expo |
| Imsil towards Seoul | S-Train West | Gokseong towards Yeosu-Expo |
Location

Namwon station is a KTX station in the city of Namwon, North Jeolla Province, on the southern coast of South Korea. It is on the Jeolla Line.
