= Yeocheon station =

Train station in South Korea

여천
Yeocheon
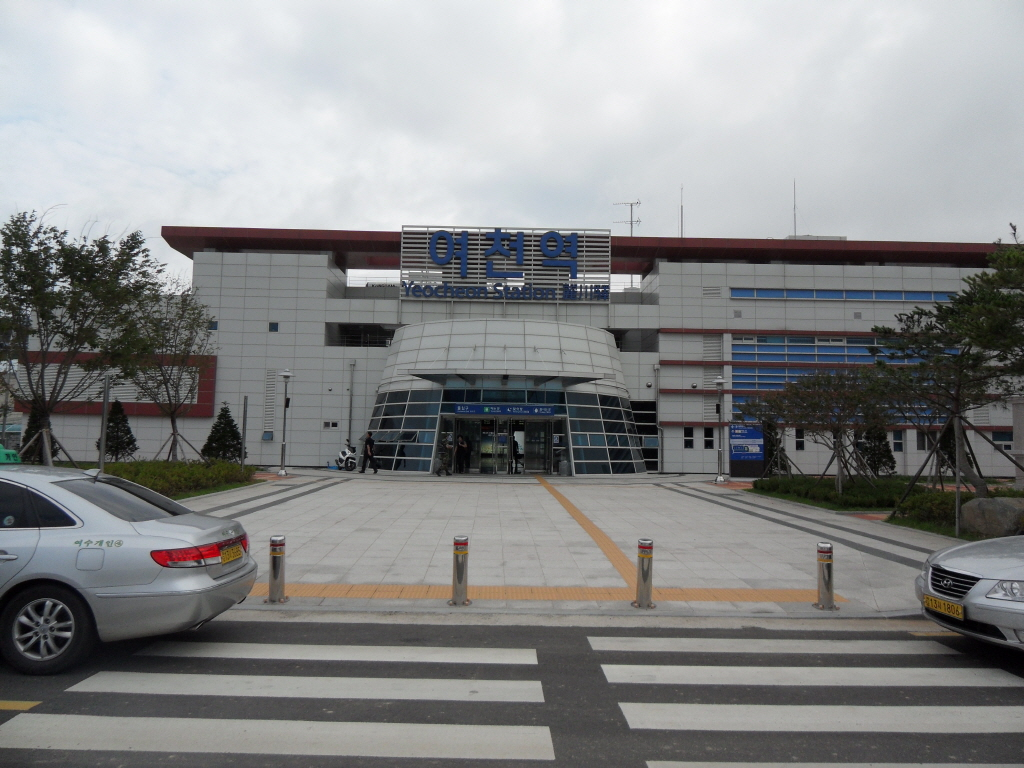

Korean name
- Hangul: 여천역
- Hanja: 麗川驛
- Revised Romanization: Yeocheonnyeok
- McCune–Reischauer: Yŏch'ŏnnyŏk

General information
- Location: Yeocheon-dong, Yeosu, South Jeolla; South Korea
- Coordinates: 34°46′45″N 127°39′52″E
- Operator: Korail
- Line: Jeolla Line
- Platforms: 2
- Tracks: 4

Construction
- Structure type: Aboveground

History
- Opened: December 25, 1930

Services
Preceding station	Korea Train Express	Following station
Suncheon towards Haengsin, Suseo or Yongsan	Jeolla KTX	Yeosu-Expo Terminus
Preceding station	Korail	Following station
Suncheon towards Yongsan	ITX-Saemaeul Jeolla Line	Yeosu-Expo Terminus
Suncheon towards Yongsan	ITX-Maum Jeolla Line	Yeosu-Expo Terminus
Suncheon towards Yongsan	Mugunghwa-ho Jeolla Line	Yeosu-Expo Terminus
Suncheon towards Seoul	S-Train West	Yeosu-Expo Terminus
Location

Yeocheon station is a KTX station in the city of Yeosu, South Jeolla Province, on the southern coast of South Korea. It is on the Jeolla Line.
