= Joseong station =

Railway station in South Korea

조성
Joseong
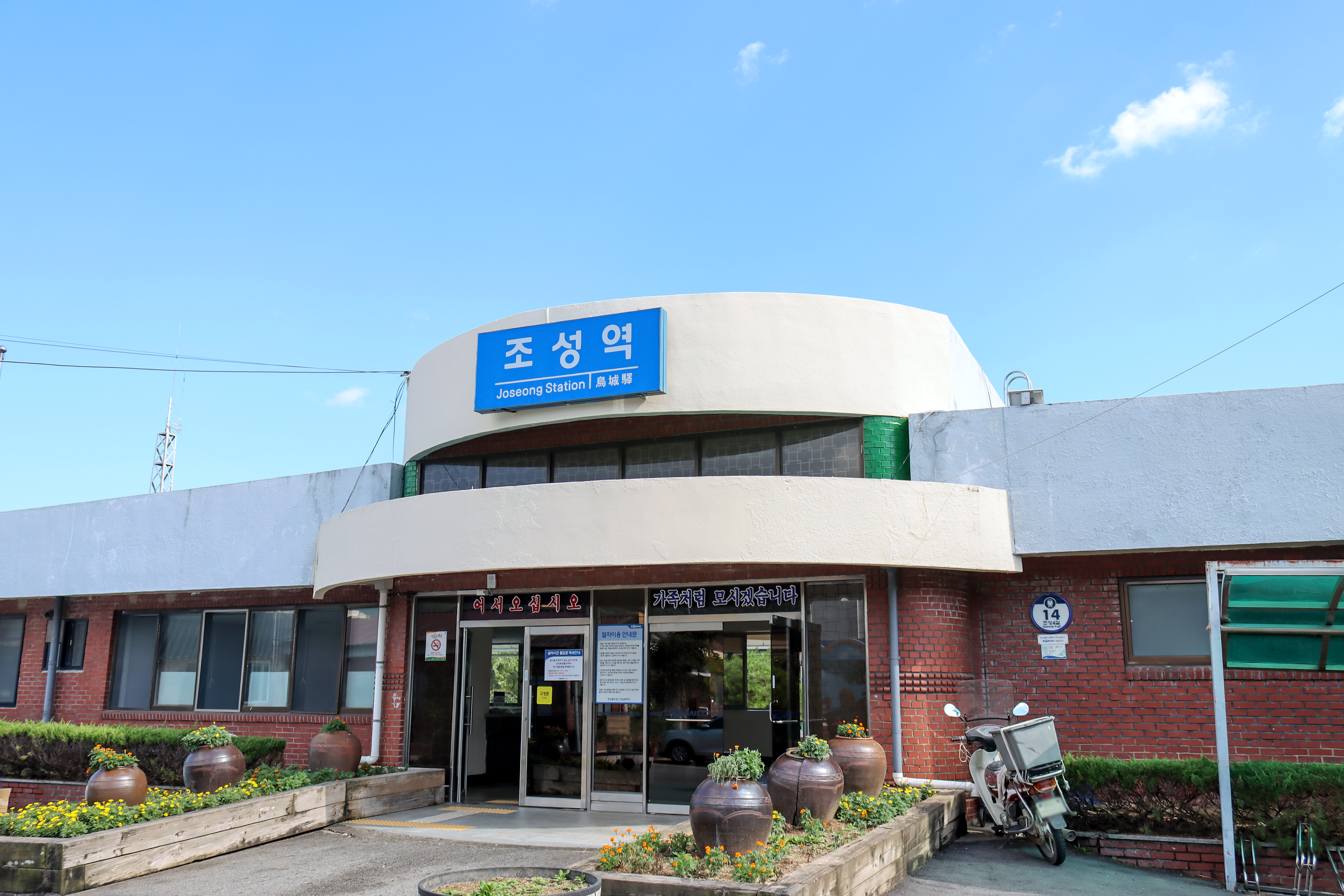

General information
- Location: South Korea
- Coordinates: 34.8068°N 127.2481°E
- Operator: Korail
- Line: Gyeongjeon Line

Construction
- Structure type: Aboveground

Services
Preceding station	Korail	Following station
Beolgyo towards Suncheon	Mugunghwa-ho Gyeongjeon Line	Yedang towards GwangjuSongjeong
Location
Location within South Korea

Joseong Station is a railway station in South Korea. It is on the Gyeongjeon Line.
