= Oryu station =

Defunct railway station in South Korea

Oryu station is a railway station on the Jeolla Line in South Korea.
