= Deungnyang station =

Metro station in Boseong County, South Korea

득량
Deungnyang
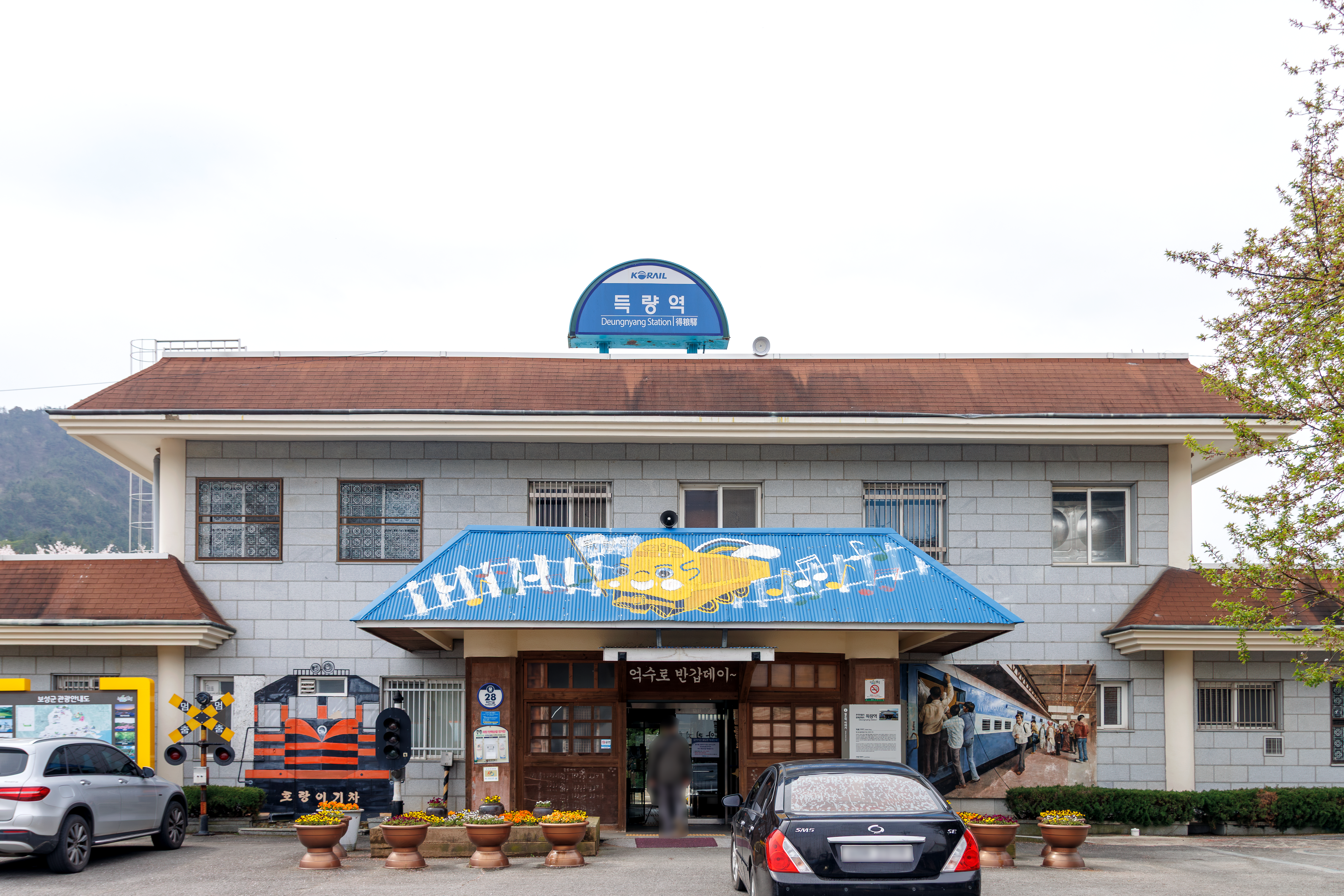

General information
- Location: South Korea
- Coordinates: 34.7615°N 127.17°E
- Operator: Korail
- Line: Gyeongjeon Line

Construction
- Structure type: Aboveground

Services
Preceding station	Korail	Following station
Yedang towards Suncheon	Mugunghwa-ho Gyeongjeon Line	Boseong towards GwangjuSongjeong
Yedang towards Bujeon	Mugunghwa-ho Mokpo–Boseong Line	Sinboseong towards Mokpo
Beolgyo towards Busan	S-Train East	Sinboseong towards Mokpo
Location
Location within South Korea

Deungnyang station (Korean: 득량역) is a railway station in South Korea. It is on the Gyeongjeon Line.
