= Iyang station =

Railway station in South Korea

이양
Iyang
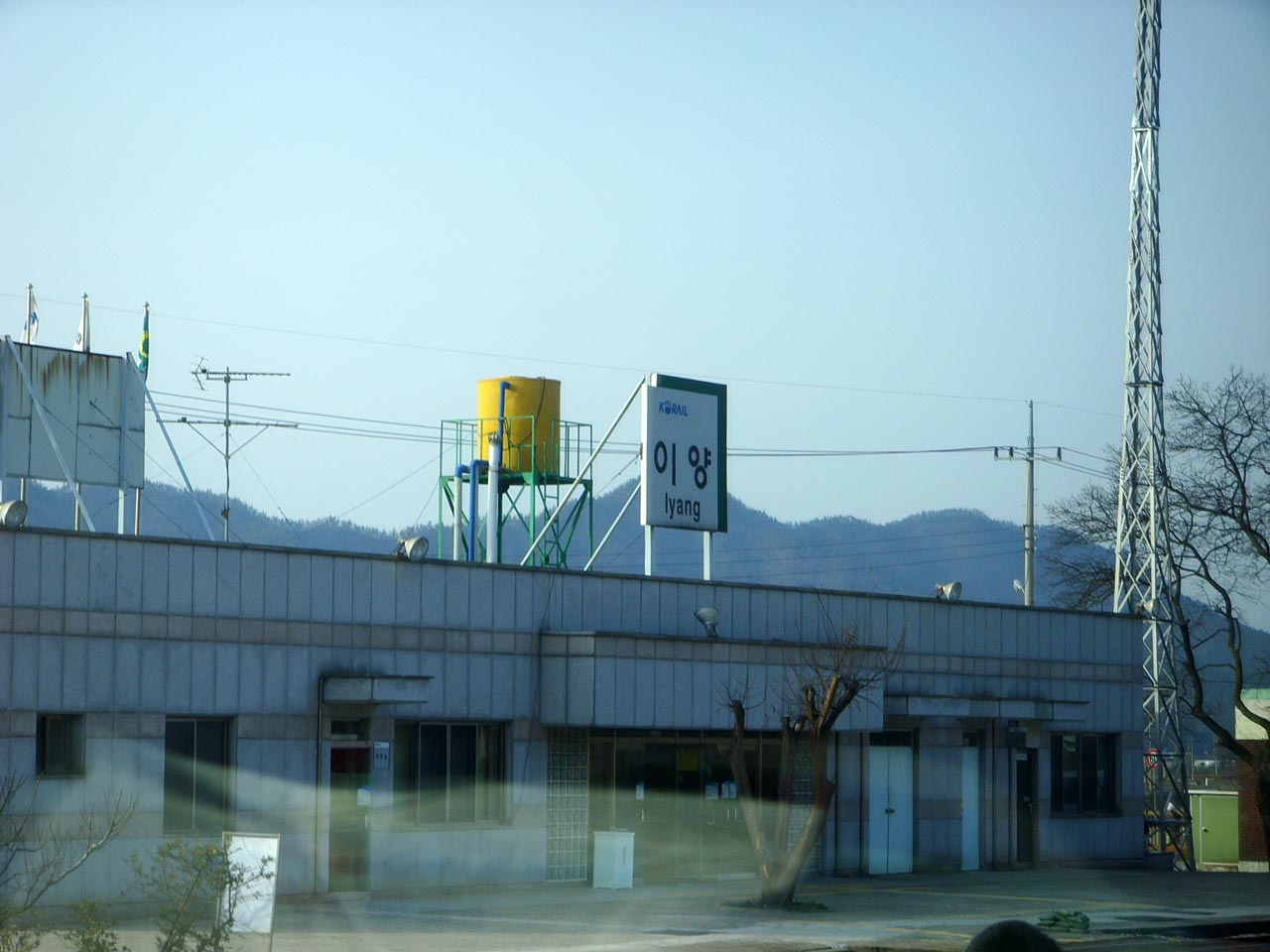

General information
- Location: South Korea
- Coordinates: 34°53′26.69″N 126°59′24.09″E
- Operator: Korail
- Line: Gyeongjeon Line

Construction
- Structure type: Aboveground

Services
Preceding station	Korail	Following station
Myeongbong towards Suncheon	Mugunghwa-ho Gyeongjeon Line	Neungju towards GwangjuSongjeong
Location
Location within South Korea

Iyang Station is a railway station in South Korea. It is on the Gyeongjeon Line.
