= Gokseong station =

Train station in South Korea

곡성
Gokseong
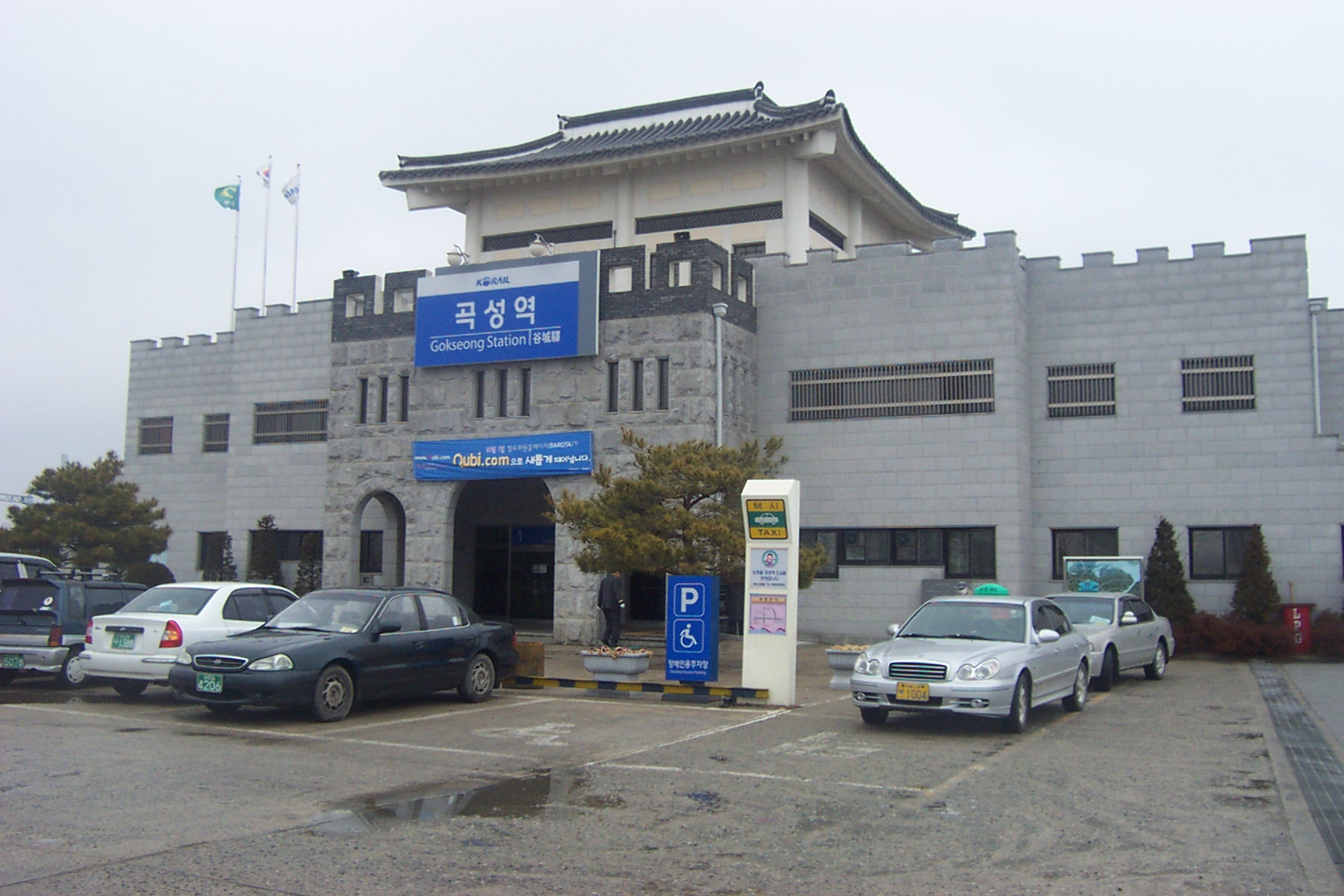

Korean name
- Hangul: 곡성역
- Hanja: 谷城驛
- Revised Romanization: Gokseong-yeok
- McCune–Reischauer: Koksŏng-yŏk

General information
- Location: Gokseong County, South Jeolla; South Korea
- Coordinates: 35°17′1.37″N 127°18′13.59″E
- Operator: Korail
- Line: Jeolla Line
- Platforms: 2
- Tracks: 4

Construction
- Structure type: Aboveground

History
- Opened: October 15, 1933

Services
Preceding station	Korea Train Express	Following station
Namwon towards Haengsin, Suseo or Yongsan	Jeolla KTX	Guryegu towards Yeosu-Expo
Preceding station	Korail	Following station
Namwon towards Yongsan	ITX-Saemaeul Jeolla Line	Guryegu towards Yeosu-Expo
Namwon towards Yongsan	ITX-Maum Jeolla Line	Guryegu towards Yeosu-Expo
Namwon towards Yongsan	Mugunghwa-ho Jeolla Line	Guryegu towards Yeosu-Expo
Namwon towards Seoul	S-Train West	Guryegu towards Yeosu-Expo
Location

Gokseong station is a KTX station in the county of Gokseong, South Jeolla Province, on the southern coast of South Korea. It is on the Jeolla Line.

== History ==
The station opened on October 15, 1933, and KTX trains on the Jeolla Line began services on October 5, 2011.
