= Yedang station =

Railway station in South Korea

예당
Yedang
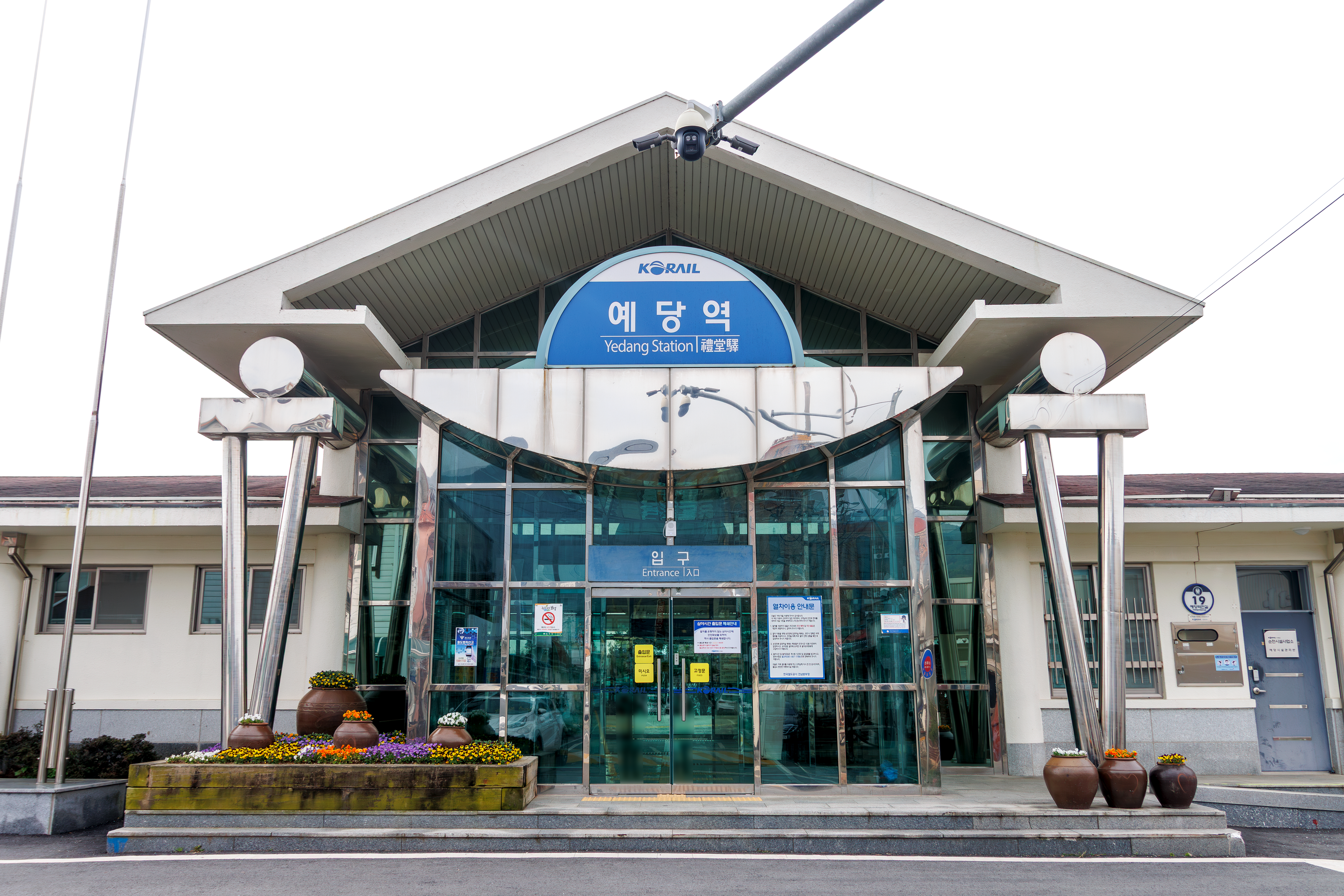
- Station building

General information
- Location: 19, Yedangyeokjeon-gil, Deungnyang-myeon, Boseong-gun, Jeollanam-do; South Korea
- Coordinates: 34°46′43.47″N 127°12′10.54″E
- Operator: Korail
- Line: Gyeongjeon Line

Construction
- Structure type: Aboveground

Services
Preceding station	Korail	Following station
Joseong towards Suncheon	Mugunghwa-ho Gyeongjeon Line	Deungnyang towards GwangjuSongjeong
Beolgyo towards Bujeon	Mugunghwa-ho Mokpo–Boseong Line	Deungnyang towards Mokpo
Location
Location within South Korea

Yedang Station is a railway station on the Gyeongjeon Line in South Korea.
