= Beolgyo station =

Railway station in South Korea

벌교
Beolgyo
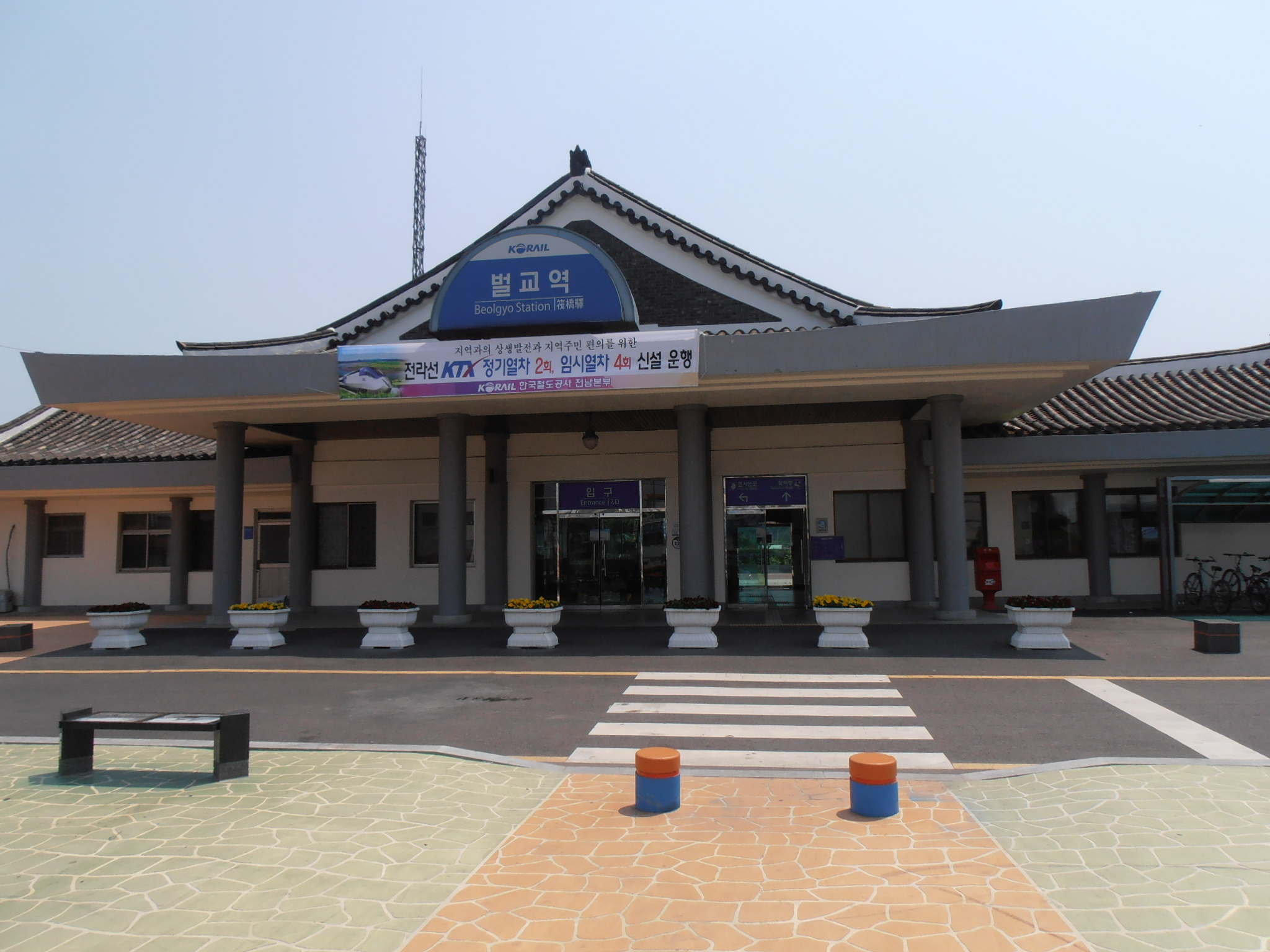

General information
- Location: South Korea
- Coordinates: 34°50′30.54″N 127°20′44.69″E
- Operator: Korail
- Line: Gyeongjeon Line

Construction
- Structure type: Aboveground

Services
| Preceding station | Korail | Following station |
|---|---|---|
| Suncheon Terminus | Mugunghwa-ho Gyeongjeon Line | Joseong towards GwangjuSongjeong |
| Suncheon towards Bujeon | Mugunghwa-ho Mokpo–Boseong Line | Yedang towards Mokpo |
| Suncheon towards Busan | S-Train East | Deungnyang towards Mokpo |
Location
Location within South Korea

Beolgyo Station is a railway station in Boseong County, within the Jeollanam-do province of South Korea. It is on the Gyeongjeon Line.
