= Boseong station =

Railway station in South Korea

보성
Boseong

General information
- Location: South Korea
- Coordinates: 34°46′0.17″N 127°4′57.64″E
- Operator: Korail
- Line: Gyeongjeon Line

Construction
- Structure type: Aboveground

Services
Preceding station	Korail	Following station
Deungnyang towards Suncheon	Mugunghwa-ho Gyeongjeon Line	Myeongbong towards GwangjuSongjeong
Location
Location within South Korea

Boseong Station is a railway station in South Korea. It is on the Gyeongjeon Line.
