= Myeongbong station =

Railway station in South Korea

명봉
Myeongbong
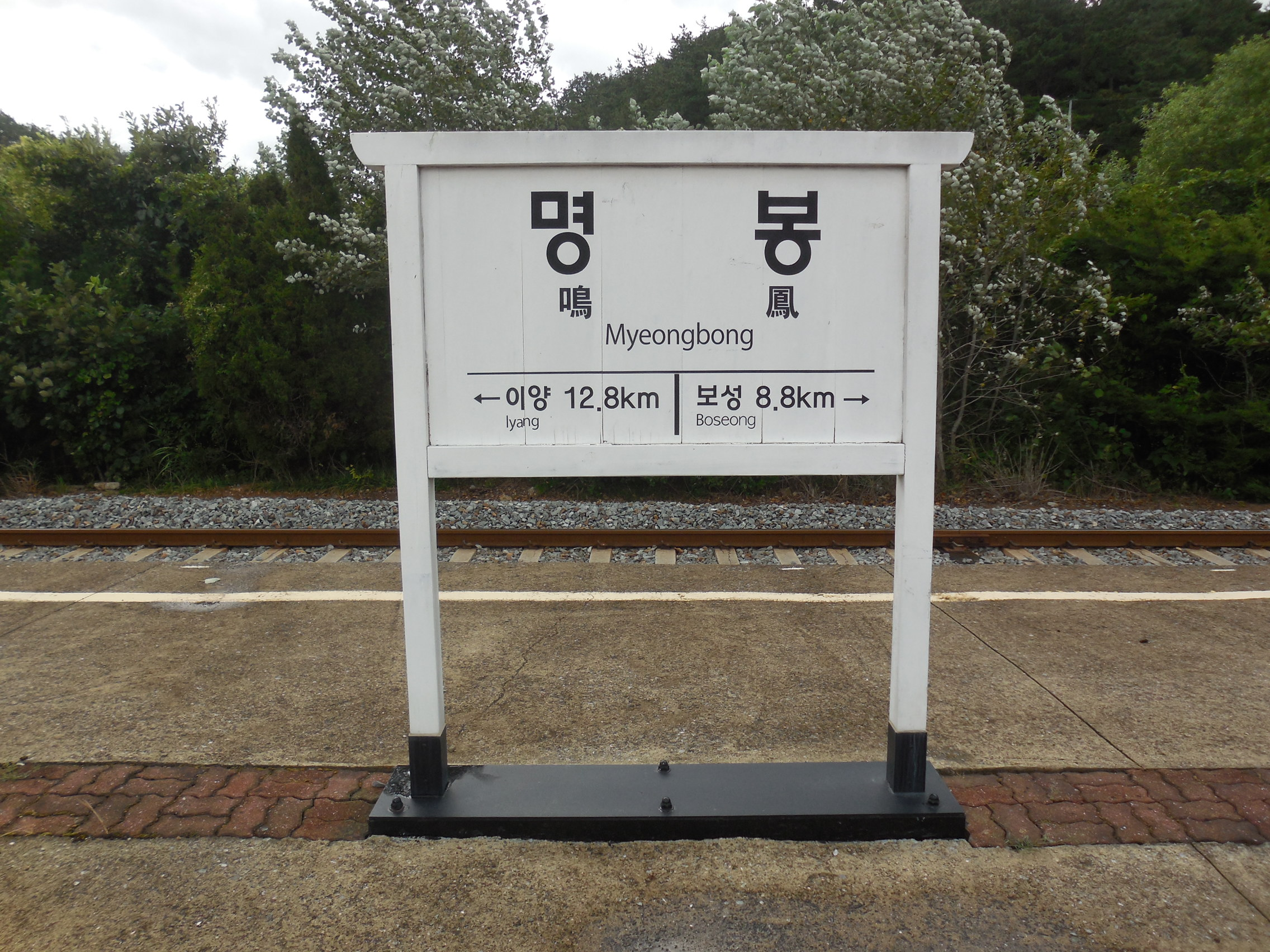

General information
- Location: South Korea
- Coordinates: 34°49′39.32″N 127°4′33.88″E
- Operator: Korail
- Line: Gyeongjeon Line

Construction
- Structure type: Aboveground

Services
Preceding station	Korail	Following station
Boseong towards Suncheon	Mugunghwa-ho Gyeongjeon Line	Iyang towards GwangjuSongjeong
Location
Location within South Korea

Myeongbong Station is a railway station on the Gyeongjeon Line in South Korea.
