= Nampyeong station =

Railway station in South Korea

남평
Nampyeong

General information
- Location: South Korea
- Coordinates: 35.0569°N 126.8718°E
- Operator: Korail
- Line: Gyeongjeon Line

Construction
- Structure type: Aboveground
Location
Location within South Korea

Nampyeong Station is a railway station on the Gyeongjeon Line in South Korea.
