= Jeolla Line =

Railway line in South Korea

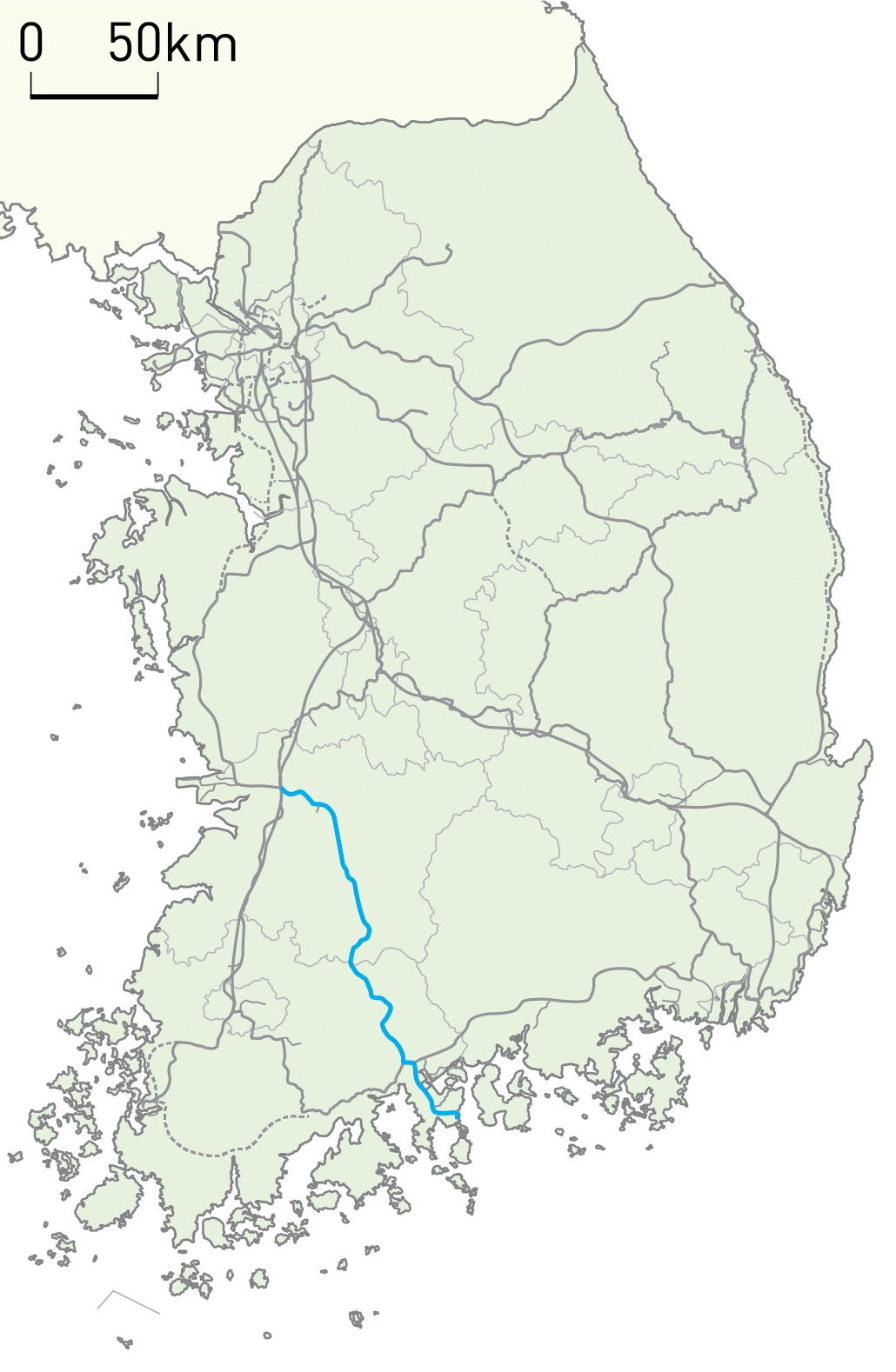

Overview
- Native name: 전라선(全羅線)
- Status: Operational
- Owner: Korea Rail Network Authority
- Locale: North Jeolla, South Jeolla
- Termini: Iksan; Yeosu-Expo
- Stations: 30

Service
- Type: Heavy rail, Passenger/freight rail Intercity rail, Regional rail
- Operator: Korail

History
- Opened: Stages between 1914-1936

Technical
- Line length: 180.4 km (112.1 mi)
- Num of tracks: Double track (Iksan - Yeocheon); Single track (Yeocheon - Yeosu-Expo)
- Track gauge: 1,435 mm (4 ft 8 1/2 in) standard gauge
- Electrification: 25 kV 60 Hz AC Overhead line
- Operating speed: 230 km/h (140 mph) (maximum)

- Jeolla Line
- Hangul: 전라선
- Hanja: 全羅線
- RR: Jeollaseon
- MR: Chŏllasŏn

The Jeolla Line (Korean: 전라선) is a railway line in North and South Jeolla Provinces in South Korea. The line is served by frequent passenger trains from Seoul (via the Gyeongbu and Honam Lines) to Yeosu.

== History ==
The first railway along a section of what became the Jeolla Line was the Zenboku Lightrail Line, a 762 mm (30.0 in) narrow gauge line from Riri to Zenshu opened by the privately owned Zenboku Light Railway on 12 November 1917. In 1927, the line was nationalised, and the Chosen Government Railway (Sentetsu) soon set to converting the line to standard gauge; this work was begun on 18 April 1929 and completed later that year. Sentetsu then extended the line, completing the Jeonju–Namwon section in October 1931, the Namwon–Gokseong section in October 1933, and finally the Gokseong–Suncheon section on 16 December 1936.

In 1936, Sentetsu nationalised the privately owned Chosen Railway's Gwangnyeo Line, which ran from Songjeongni to Yeosu and Yeosu Port via Suncheon, renaming it Songnyeo Line and splitting it apart to merge the Suncheon–Yeosu section with the Jeonbuk Line to create the Jeolla Line in 1936. The line was completed with the reconstruction of the Iri (today Iksan) to Jeonju section in March 1937.

=== Upgrade ===
The upgrade of the Iksan-Suncheon section started with the construction of a bypass around Jeonju with wider curves, opened in 1981.

From 1989, the first phase of the project to re-lay and double-track the line, mostly in a new alignment with wider curves, longer tunnels and bridges, was launched on three sections between Sin-ri, at the end of the Jeonju realignment, and Suncheon. The two longest new structures were the 5,671 m (18,606 ft) long Byeongpung Tunnel, north of Suncheon, and the 6,128 m (20,105 ft) long Seulchi Tunnel, south of Jeonju, which became South Korea's longest rail tunnel, surpassing Jeongam Tunnel on the Taebaek Line. The three sections of the first phase with altogether 64.3 km (40.0 mi), shortening the original route by 16.7 km (10.4 mi), were finished by 1999 and entered service on 18 May 1999. The two gaps between those sections were plugged in a second phase in 2002 and August 2004, the altogether 58.3 km (36.2 mi) long new sections shortened the line by another 11.4 km (7.1 mi).

The third phase of the upgrading project, started in 2002, involved the double-tracking of the remaining 35.2 km (21.9 mi) long single-track section from Iksan to Sin-ri, until the end of the Jeonju realignment, and electrification of the entire double-tracked and re-aligned section from Iksan to Suncheon, altogether 154.2 km (95.8 mi), to allow speeds of 180 km/h (110 mph). By March 2010, progress on the 154.2 km (95.8 mi) section from Iksan to Suncheon reached 63.0%. This phase of the project is implemented as a public private partnership of the Build-Transfer-Lease (BTL) method, with a government contribution of 510.852 billion won and a BTL share of 470.699 billion won. The upgrade and re-alignment of the final Suncheon-Yeosu section was launched as a separate project in 2001, with work starting in December 2003. As of March 2010, progress on the 40.0 km (24.9 mi) long alignment stood at 88.0% out of a total budget of 732.002 billion won. The entire upgrading project is to be completed in 2011.

On September 1, 2010, the South Korean government announced a strategic plan to reduce travel times from Seoul to 95% of the country to under 2 hours by 2020. As part of the plan, the Jeolla Line is to be further upgraded for 230 km/h (140 mph).

On 22 April 2021, the 2010s strategic plan above was absorbed into another project, which involved the Jeolla Line to be further upgraded to 370 km/h (230 mph), scheduled for completion in 2030.

== Major stations ==
Major stations and junctions on the line:

- Iksan (formerly known as Iri), junction with the Honam Line and Janghang Line;
- Dongsan, terminus of the Bukjeonju Line;
- Jeonju, capital of North Jeolla;
- Suncheon, junction with the Gyeongjeon Line;
- Deogyang, terminus of the Yeocheon Line; and
- Yeosu on the south coast.

== Services ==
The Jeolla Line is served by intercity ITX-Saemaeul trains and cross-country Mugunghwa-ho trains. As of October 2010, the travel time on the Saemaeul-ho from Yongsan station in Seoul is a minimum 3 hours 28 minutes to Jeonju, 4 hours 33 minutes to Suncheon and 5 hours 15 minutes to Yeosu, with 2 hours 30 minutes taken for the Iksan—Jeosu travel along the Jeolla Line itself. Mugunghwa-ho trains that also start in Yongsan cover the line from Iksan to Yeosu in between a minimum of 2 hours 30 minutes and a maximum of 4 hours, depending on the number of stops.

=== Jeolla KTX ===
Yeosu hosted the Expo 2012, and Korail timed the introduction of Korea Train Express services on the line ahead of the event. Original plans foresaw the start of Jeolla KTX services in April 2011, reducing the Seoul–Yeosu travel time to 2 hours 55 minutes, using KTX-II (KTX-Sancheon) high-speed trains. In February 2011, when the necessary electrification works were 96% complete, the start of services was postponed to September 2011, and the Yongsan–Yeosu travel time was planned to be 3 hours 7 minutes. After the completion of the first stage of the Honam High Speed Railway, the travel time is planned to reduce to 2 hours 25 minutes.

== See also ==
- Korail
- Transportation in South Korea
