= Yeosu Expo station =

KTX station in Yeosu, South Korea

여수엑스포
Yeosu-Expo

Korean name
- Hangul: 여수엑스포역
- Hanja: 麗水엑스포驛
- Revised Romanization: Yeosu-ekseupo-yeok
- McCune–Reischauer: Yŏsu-eksŭp'o-yŏk

General information
- Location: Deokchung-dong, Yeosu, South Jeolla; South Korea
- Coordinates: 34°45′28″N 127°44′50″E
- Operator: Korail
- Line: Jeolla Line
- Platforms: 2
- Tracks: 4

Construction
- Structure type: Aboveground

History
- Opened: December 25, 1930

Services
Preceding station	Korea Train Express	Following station
Yeocheon towards Haengsin, Suseo or Yongsan	Jeolla KTX	Terminus
Preceding station	Korail	Following station
Yeocheon towards Yongsan	ITX-Saemaeul Jeolla Line	Terminus
Yeocheon towards Yongsan	ITX-Maum Jeolla Line	Terminus
Yeocheon towards Yongsan	Mugunghwa-ho Jeolla Line	Terminus
Yeocheon towards Seoul	S-Train West	Terminus
Location

Yeosu-Expo station (Ko: 여수엑스포역) is a KTX station in the city of Yeosu, South Jeolla Province, South Korea. It is on the Jeolla Line.

KTX, ITX-Saemaeul, Mugunghwa-ho, and the S-Train stop at the station. It is registered as Yeosu-EXPO (Korean name 여수EXPO) on the Korea Railroad's computer network, and is registered as just an expo on the railway logistics information system. Dolsando Island and several beaches are nearby, so many tourists enjoy it during the summer season, and it plays an important role in railroad transportation linking Suncheon and Yeosu National Industrial Complex.

== See also ==
- Expo 2012
