= KTX =

High-speed rail system of South Korea

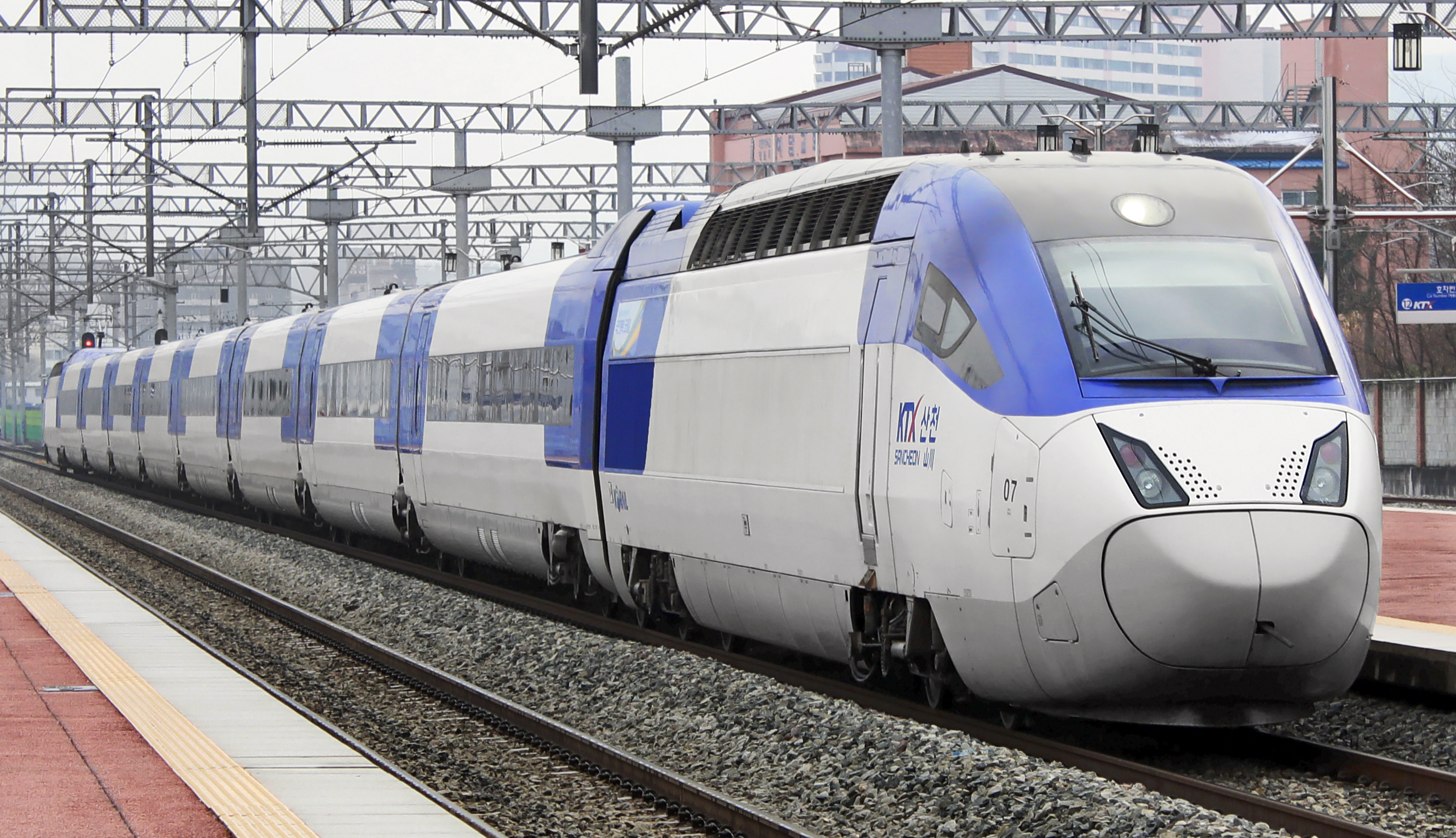
- A KTX-Sancheon arriving

Overview
- Service type: Inter-city; high-speed rail
- Status: Operating
- Locale: South Korea
- First service: 1 April 2004; 22 years ago
- Current operator: Korail

On-board services
- Classes: First class; Superior class; Standard class
- Disabled access: Fully accessible
- Catering facilities: Yes
- Entertainment facilities: Yes
- Baggage facilities: Yes

Technical
- Rolling stock: KTX-I; KTX-Sancheon; KTX-Eum; KTX-Cheongryong
- Track gauge: 1,435 mm (4 ft 8 1/2 in) Standard gauge
- Electrification: 25 kV/60 Hz overhead catenary
- Operating speed: Up to 305 km/h (190 mph)

Korean name
- Hangul: 한국고속철도
- Hanja: 韓國高速鐵道
- RR: Hanguk gosok cheoldo
- MR: Han'guk kosok ch'ŏlto
Route map

KTX (Korea Train eXpress, Korean: 한국고속철도) is the first high-speed rail system in South Korea, and is operated by Korail. Construction began on the high-speed line from Seoul to Busan in 1992. KTX services were launched on April 1, 2004.

The KTX services now radiate from Seoul and Suseo stations toward destinations across the nation, except for Jungbunaeryuk Line services which depart from Pangyo.

The current maximum operating speed for trains in regular service is 305 km/h (190 mph), though the infrastructure is designed for 350 km/h (217 mph).

The initial rolling stock was based on Alstom's TGV Réseau, and was partly built in Korea. The domestically developed HSR-350x, which achieved 352.4 km/h (219.0 mph) in tests, resulted in a second type of high-speed trains now operated by Korail, the KTX-Sancheon, which entered into commercial service in 2010.

The next generation experimental electric multiple unit prototype, HEMU-430X, achieved 421.4 km/h (261.8 mph) in 2013, making South Korea the world's fourth country after Japan, France and China to develop a high-speed train running on conventional rail above 420 km/h (260 mph). It was further developed into commercialized variants, namely KTX-Eum and KTX-Cheongryong, with respective maximum service speeds of 260 km/h (160 mph) and 320 km/h (200 mph), which entered into KTX services in 2021 and 2024, respectively.

== History ==
=== Initial planning ===
The Seoul–Busan axis is Korea's main traffic corridor. In 1982, it represented 65.8% of South Korea's population, a number that grew to 73.3% by 1995, along with 70% of freight traffic and 66% of passenger traffic. With both the Gyeongbu Expressway and Korail's Gyeongbu Line congested as of the late 1970s, the government saw the pressing need for another form of transportation.

The first proposals for a second Seoul–Busan railway line originated from a study prepared between 1972 and 1974 by experts from France's SNCF and the Japan Railway Technical Service on a request from the IBRD. A more detailed 1978–1981 study by KAIST, focusing on the needs of freight transport, also concluded that separating long-distance passenger traffic on a high-speed passenger railway would be advisable, and it was adopted in the following Korean Five Year Plan.

During the subsequent years, several feasibility studies were conducted for a high-speed line that aimed to reduce the travel time between Seoul and Busan to just 1 hour and 30 minutes. These studies yielded positive results. In 1989, after receiving the green light for the project, the necessary institutions were established to oversee its preparation. These institutions included the Gyeongbu High-Speed Electric Railway & New International Airport Committee and the High-Speed Electric Railway Planning Department, which was later renamed the HSR Project Planning Board. By 1990, the planned travel time between Seoul and Busan had been reduced to 1 hour and 51 minutes, and the project was scheduled to be completed by August 1998. and costs were estimated at 5.85 trillion South Korean won (₩) in 1988 prices, 4.6 trillion of which were to be spent on infrastructure, the remainder on rolling stock.

As planning progressed, the Korea High-Speed Rail Construction Authority (KHSRCA) was established in March 1992 as a separate body with its own budget responsible for the project. In the 1993 reappraisal of the project, the completion date was pushed back to May 2002, and cost estimates grew to ₩10.74 trillion. 82% of the cost increase was due to a 90% increase in unit costs in the construction sector, mostly labor costs but also material costs, and the remainder due to alignment changes. To finance the project, the option of a build-operate-transfer (BOT) franchise was rejected as too risky. Funding included direct government grants (35%), government (10%) and foreign (18%) loans, domestic bond sales (31%) and private capital (6%).

=== Construction of Gyeongbu high-speed line ===
==== Start of construction ====
KHSRCA started construction of the Seoul–Busan Gyeongbu high-speed railway (Gyeongbu HSR) on June 30, 1992, on the 57 km (35 mi) long section from Cheonan to Daejeon, which was intended for use as test track.

Construction started before the choice of the main technology supplier; thus, alignment design was set out to be compatible with all choices. Of the planned 411 km (255 mi) line, 152.73 km (94.90 mi) would be laid on bridges, and another 138.68 km (86.17 mi) in tunnels. However, plans were changed repeatedly, in particular those for city sections, following disputes with local governments, while construction work suffered from early quality problems. Planned operating speed was also reduced from 350 km/h (217 mph) to the 300 km/h (186 mph) maximum of high-speed trains on the market. Three competitors bid for the supply of the core system, which included the rolling stock, catenary and signalling: consortia led by GEC-Alsthom, today Alstom, one of the builders of France's TGV trains; Siemens, one of the builders of Germany's ICE trains; and Mitsubishi Heavy Industries, one of the builders of Japan's Shinkansen trains. In 1994, the alliance of GEC-Alsthom and its Korean subsidiary Eukorail were chosen as winner.

The technology was almost identical to that found on the high-speed lines of France's TGV system. Track-related design specifications included a design speed of 350 km/h (217 mph) and standard gauge.

==== Phase 1: Seoul–Daegu segment and conventional line upgrades ====
Following the 1997 Asian financial crisis, the government decided to realise the Gyeongbu HSR in two phases. In the first phase, two-thirds of the high-speed line between the southwestern suburbs of Seoul and Daegu would be finished by 2004, with trains travelling along the parallel conventional line along the rest of the Seoul–Busan route. The upgrade and electrification of these sections of the Gyeongbu Line was added to the project, and the upgrade and electrification of the Honam Line from Daejeon to Mokpo, providing a second route for KTX services. The budget for the first phase was set at ₩12,737.7 billion, that for the entire project at ₩18,435.8 billion in 1998 prices. While the share of government contributions remained unchanged, the share of foreign loans, domestic bond sales and private capital changed to 24%, 29%, and 2%.

The infrastructure and rolling stock were created in the framework of a technology transfer agreement, which paired up Korean companies with core system supplier Alstom and its European subcontractors for different subsystems. Alstom's part of the project amounted to US$2.1 billion or €1.5 billion.

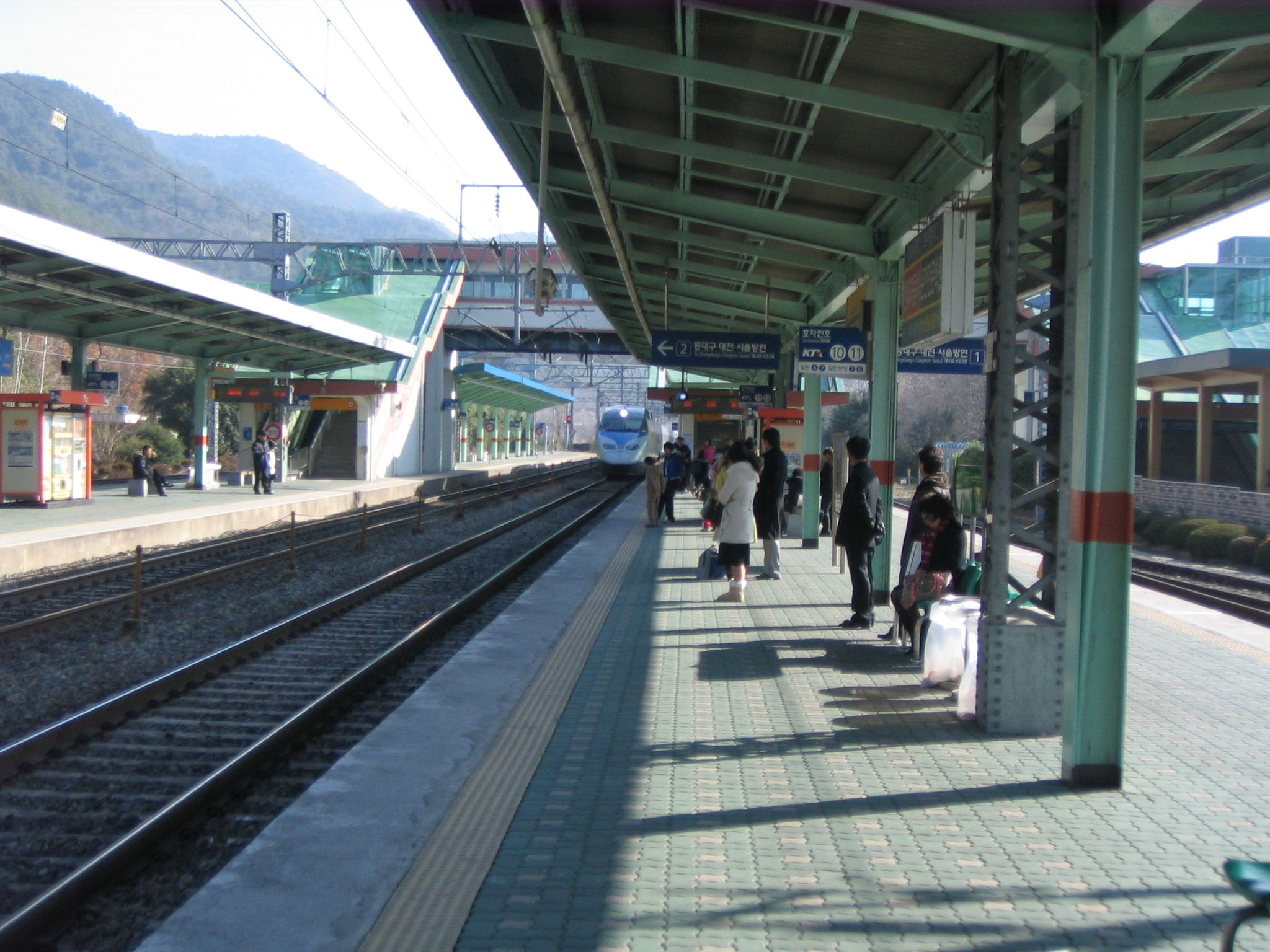
KTX train approaches Miryang station, on the non-high-speed Daegu–Busan section

Well ahead of the opening of the Gyeongbu HSR for regular service, in December 1999, 34.4 km (21.4 mi) of the test section, later extended to 57 km (35 mi), was finished to enable trials with trains. After further design changes, the high-speed tracks were finished over a length of 223.6 km (138.9 mi), with 15.0 km (9.3 mi) of interconnections to the conventional Gyeongbu Line, including at a short interruption at Daejeon. The high-speed section itself included 83.1 km (51.6 mi) of viaducts and 75.6 km (47.0 mi) of tunnels. Conventional line electrification was finished over the 132.8 km (82.5 mi) across Daegu and on to Busan, the 20.7 km (12.9 mi) across Daejeon, and the 264.4 km (164.3 mi) from Daejeon to Mokpo and Gwangju. After 12 years of construction and with a final cost of ₩12,737.7 billion, the initial KTX system with the first phase of the Gyeongbu HSR went into service on April 1, 2004.

==== Phase 2: Daegu–Busan, extra stations, urban sections ====
The Daegu–Busan section of the Gyeongbu HSR became a separate project with the July 1998 project revision, with a budget of ₩5,698.1 billion, with funding from the government and private sources by the same ratios as for phase 1. In August 2006, the project was modified to again include the Daejeon and Daegu urban area passages, as well as additional stations along the phase 1 section. For these additions, the budget as well as the government's share of the funding was increased.

Construction started in June 2002. The 128.1 km (79.6 mi) line, which follows a long curve to the northeast of the existing Gyeongbu Line, includes 54 viaducts with a total length of 23.4 km (14.5 mi) and 38 tunnels with a total length of 74.2 km (46.1 mi). The two largest structures are the 20,323 m (66,677 ft) Geomjeung Tunnel, under Mount Geumjeong at the Busan end of the line; and the 13,270 m (43,540 ft) Wonhyo Tunnel, under Mount Cheonseong south-west of Ulsan, which became the longest and second longest tunnels in Korea once the line opened.

A long dispute concerning the environmental impact assessment of the Wonhyo Tunnel, which passes under a wetland area, caused delays for the entire project. The dispute gained nationwide and international attention due to the repeated hunger strikes of a Buddhist nun, led to a suspension of works in 2005, and only ended with a supreme court ruling in June 2006. With the exception of the sections across Daejeon and Daegu, the second phase went into service on November 1, 2010. By that time, ₩4,905.7 billion was spent out of a second phase budget, or ₩17,643.4 billion out of the total.

The two sections across the urban areas of Daejeon and Daegu, altogether 40.9 km (25.4 mi), will be finished by 2014. As of October 2010, the total cost of the second phase was estimated at ₩7,945.4 billion, that for the entire project at ₩20,728.2 billion. The last element of the original project that was shelved in 1998, separate underground tracks across the Seoul metropolitan area, was re-launched in June 2008, when an initial plan with a 28.6 km (17.8 mi) long alignment and two new stations was announced.

=== Early 2010s service expansion and existing lines upgrade ===
The electrification and the completion of the re-alignment and double-tracking of the Jeolla Line, which branches from the Honam Line at Iksan and continues to Suncheon and Yeosu, began in December 2003, with the aim to introduce KTX services in time for the Expo 2012 in Yeosu. The upgrade will allow to raise top speed from 120 to 180 km/h (75 to 112 mph). The section of the perpendicular Gyeongjeon Line from Samnangjin, the junction with the Gyeongbu Line near Busan, to Suncheon is upgraded in a similar way, with track doubling, alignment modifications and electrification for 180 km/h (112 mph). The until Masan was opened on December 15, 2010. The upgrade is to be complete until Jinju by 2012 and Suncheon by 2014.

AREX line, which link Seoul to the city's Incheon Airport, also see its speed raised from 110 to 180 km/h (68 to 112 mph) for KTX through-running service to other cities in the nation, however the through running service have been discontinued due to low usage.

The Ulsan–Gyeongju–Pohang section of the Donghae Line is foreseen for an upgrade in a completely new alignment that circumvents downtown Gyeongju and connects to the Gyeongbu High Speed Railway at Singyeongju Station, allowing for direct KTX access to the two cities. On April 23, 2009, the project was approved by the government, and a ground-breaking ceremony was held. The altogether 76.56 km (47.57 mi) line is slated to be opened in December 2014.

=== 2nd national construction plan ===
On September 1, 2010, the South Korean government announced a strategic plan to reduce travel times from Seoul to 95% of the country to under 2 hours by 2020. The main new element of the plan is to aim for top speeds of 230–250 km/h (143–155 mph) in upgrades of much of the mainline network with view to the introduction of KTX services. The conventional lines under the scope of the plan include the above, already on-going projects, and their extensions along the rest of the southern and eastern coasts of South Korea, lines along the western coast, lines north of Seoul, and the second, more easterly line between Seoul and Busan with some connecting lines.

=== New high speed lines in the 2010s ===
==== Honam HSR ====
Until 2006, the first plans for a second, separate high-speed line from Seoul to Mokpo were developed into the project of a line branching from the Gyeongbu HSR and constructed in two stages, the Honam High Speed Railway (Honam HSR). The budget for the 185.75 km (115.42 mi) first stage, from the new Osong Station on the Gyongbu HSR to Gwangju·Songjeong Station, was set at ₩8,569.5 billion. The second stage, the 48.74 km (30.29 mi) remaining to Mokpo, was to be finished by 2017 with a budget of ₩2,002.2 billion. The Osong-Iksan section of the first phase is also intended for use as high-speed test track for rolling stock development, to be fitted with special catenary and instrumented track. The ground-breaking ceremony was held on December 4, 2009. As of September 2010, progress was 9.6% of the project budget then estimated at ₩10,490.1 billion for the first phase, which was due for completion in 2014, while the estimate for the entire line stood at ₩12,101.7 billion.

==== Suseo HSR ====
First plans for the Honam HSR foresaw a terminus at Suseo, southeast Seoul. The branch to Suseo was re-launched as a separate project, the Suseo High Speed Railway (Suseo HSR), in June 2008. Detailed design of the 61.1 km (38.0 mi) line is underway since September 2010, with opening planned by the end of 2014. For the longer term, new high-speed lines from Seoul to Sokcho on the eastern coast, and a direct branch from the Gyeongbu HSR south to Jinju and further to the coast are under consideration. In conjunction with the award of the 2018 Winter Olympics to PyeongChang in July 2011, KTX service via the eastern coast line was anticipated; the expected travel time there from Seoul is 50 minutes.

The line is currently served by SRT, not KTX.

=== Future plans ===
==== Jeju Island ====
In January 2009, the Korea Transport Institute also proposed a 167 km (104 mi) line from Mokpo to Jeju Island, putting Jeju 2 hours 26 minutes from Seoul. The line would include a 28 km (17 mi) bridge from Haenam to Bogil Island and a 73 km (45 mi) undersea tunnel from Bogil Island to Jeju Island (with a drilling station on Chuja Island), for an estimated cost of US$10 billion. As the proposal was popular with lawmakers from South Jeolla Province, the government is conducting a feasibility study, but the Jeju governor expressed skepticism. The Seoul-Jeju route is the world's busiest air route with 13.7 million passengers (2023). However, Jeju Gov. Won Hee-ryong opposed this plan since it would ruin the island's identity and make the Jeju economy more dependent on the mainland.

== Technology ==
The shock absorption design absorbs 80 percent of the shock energy when the train crashes. Automatic ventilation is installed to prevent noise from occurring when trains enter and exit the tunnel. Articulated bogies help increase ride comfort and driving safety.

== Rolling stock ==
=== KTX-I ===
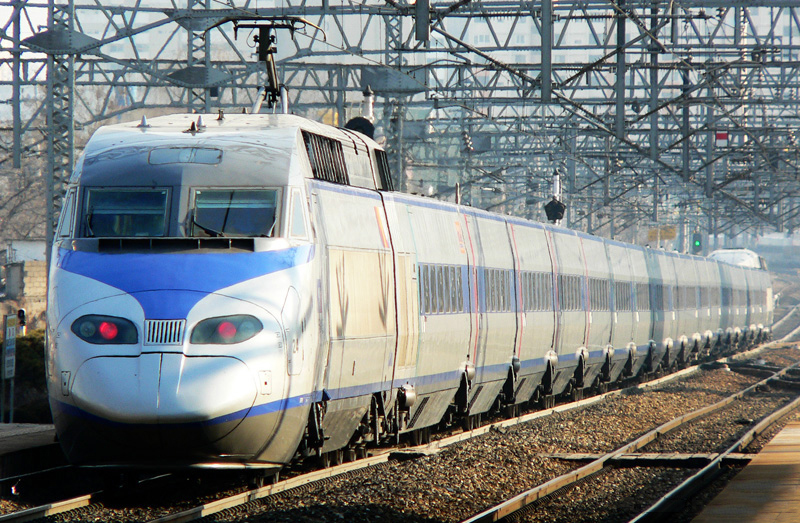
The TGV derived KTX-I.

The initial KTX-I trainsets, also known as simply KTX or as TGV-K, are based on the TGV Réseau, but with several differences. 46 trains were built - the initial twelve in France by Alstom, the remainder in South Korea by Rotem. The 20-car trains consist of two traction heads, which are powered end cars without passenger compartments, and eighteen articulated passenger cars, of which the two extreme ones have one motorized bogie each. A KTX-I was built to carry up to 935 passengers at a regular top speed of 300 km/h (186 mph), later increased to 305 km/h (190 mph).

=== KTX-Sancheon ===
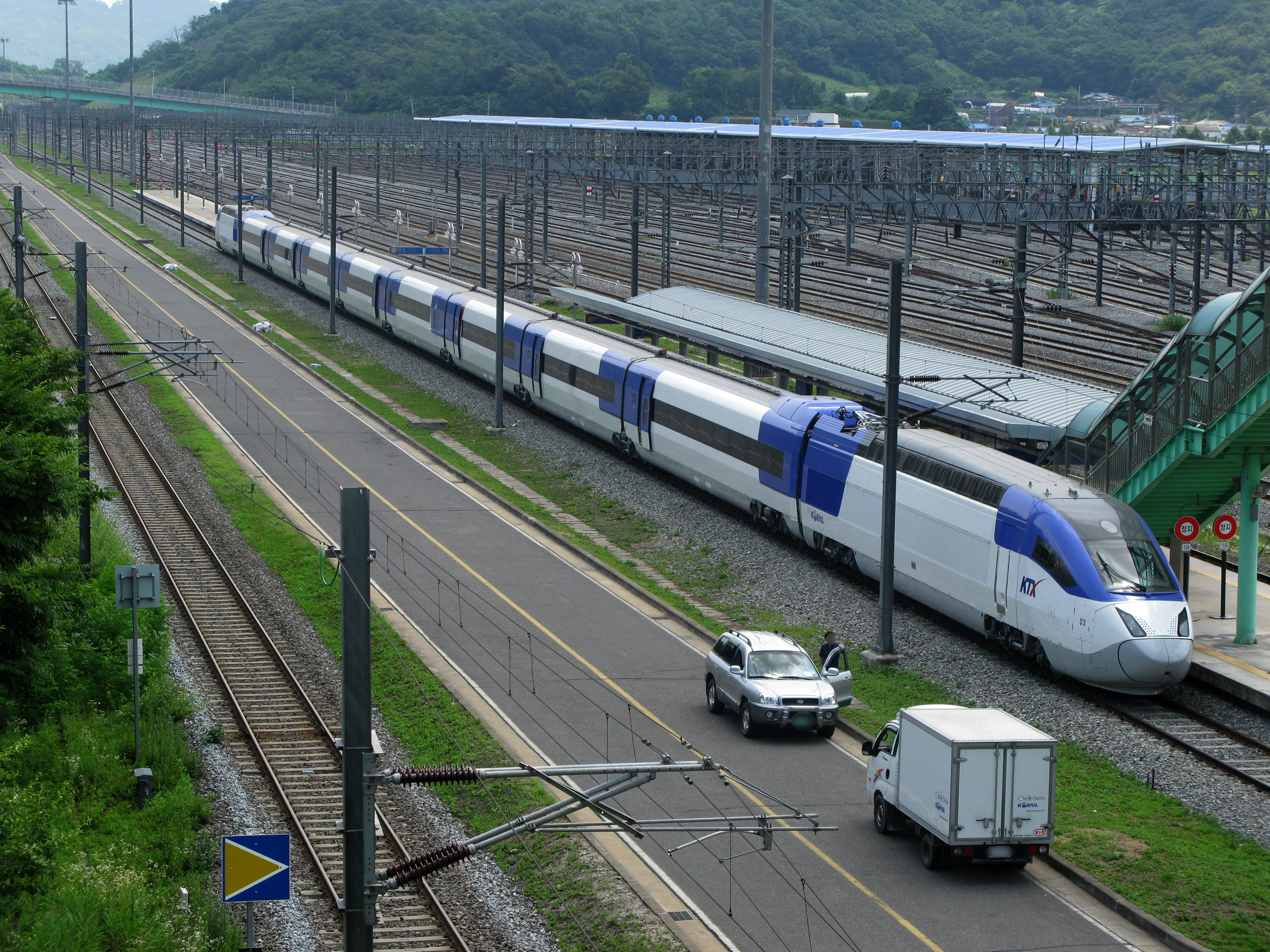
The HSR-350x-derived KTX-II.

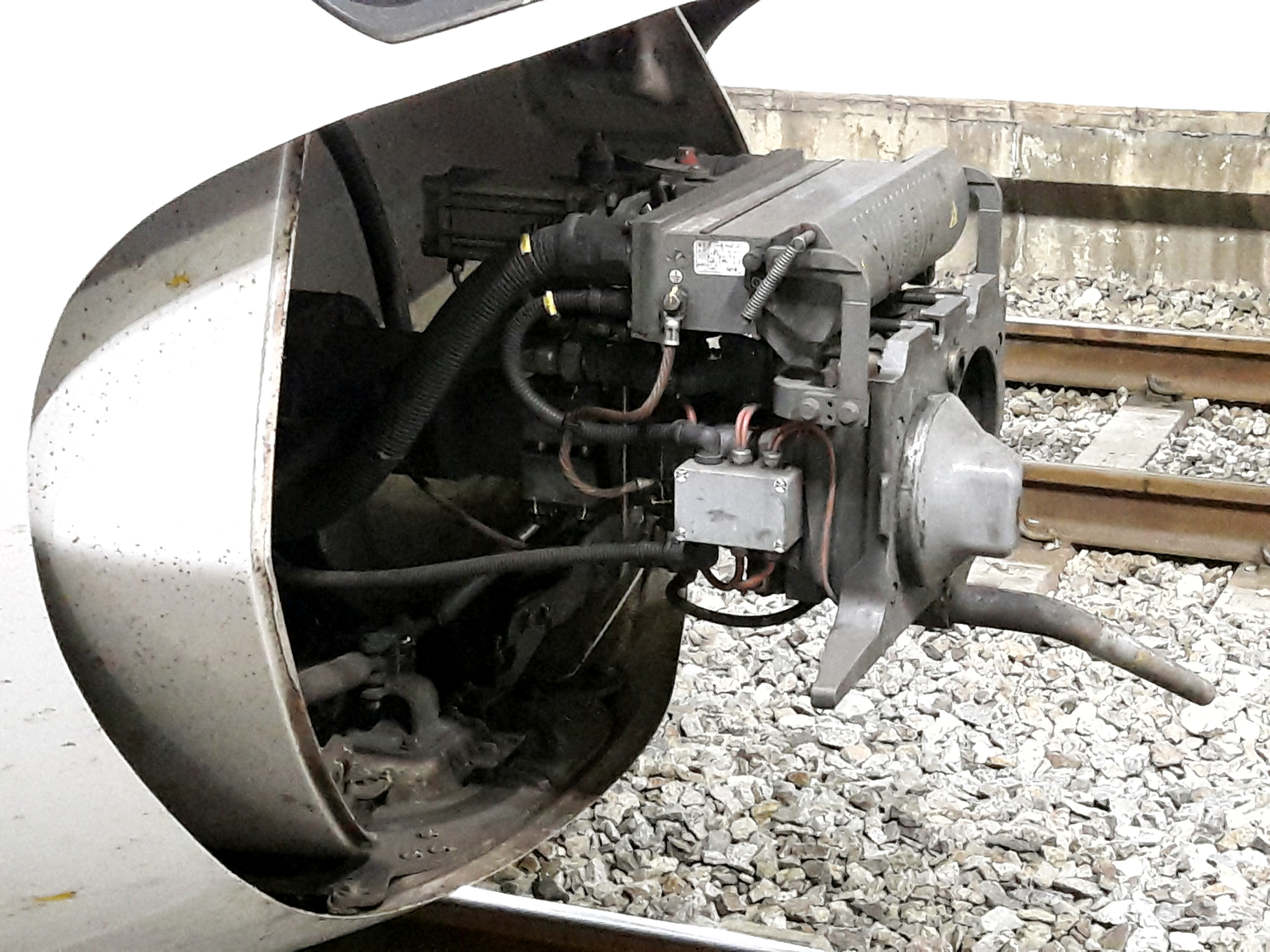
Coupler at the front of the train for combined operation.

For less frequented relations and for operational flexibility, a 2001 study proposed a train created by scaling down the planned commercial version of the HSR-350x, by shortening the train, removing powered bogies from intermediate cars, and lowering top speed. Hyundai Rotem received orders for altogether 24 such trains, called KTX-II, in three batches from July 2006 to December 2008.

Design speed is 330 km/h (205 mph), and revenue service speed is 305 km/h (190 mph). The power electronics uses newer technology than the HSR-350x, and the front is a new design, too. The trainsets, of which two can be coupled together, consist of two traction heads and eight articulated passenger cars, and seat 363 passengers in two classes, with enhanced comfort relative to the KTX-I. The domestic added value of the trains was increased to 87%, compared to 58% for the KTX-I. Imported parts include the pantographs, semiconductors in the power electronics, front design, couplers and final drives.

The train was developed on the basis of the transferred TGV technology, but more advanced technology was used for the new motors, power electronics and additional brake systems, while the passenger cars were made of aluminum to save weight, and the nose was a new design with reduced aerodynamic drag. Test runs were conducted between 2002 and 2008, in the course of which HSR-350x achieved the South Korean rail speed record of 352.4 km/h (219.0 mph) on December 16, 2004.

The KTX-II was officially renamed as KTX-Sancheon (Korean: KTX-산천) after the Korean name of the indigenous fish cherry salmon before the first units started commercial service on March 2, 2010.

However, within weeks of its initial launch, mechanical and design flaws began to appear, in some cases causing trains to stop running and forcing passengers to leave the train and walk back to the station, and in one particular case derailing from the tracks on February 11, 2011. Although the trains were designed to be a domestically built replacement for the French built Alstom trains, due to over 30 malfunctions since March 2, 2010, Korail asked manufacturer Hyundai-Rotem to recall all 19 of the trains in operation after finding cracks in two anchor bands in May 2011. Following the recall, the KTX-Sancheon trains were put back in service.

In addition to the 24 initial KTX-Sancheon trains, which form the KTX-Sancheon Class 11, new batches have been ordered and delivered since, to provide service on the new Honam, Suseo and Gyeonggang lines. For the opening of the Honam HSR line, 22 trainsets, named Class 12, were delivered ahead of the 2015 opening. In addition, 10 trainsets have been delivered to provide service on the Suseo line, scheduled to open in December 2016 (Class 13), and 15 trainsets (Class 14) have been ordered for the Gyeonggang Line, which opened in late 2017 ahead of the 2018 Winter Olympics.

=== KTX-Eum ===
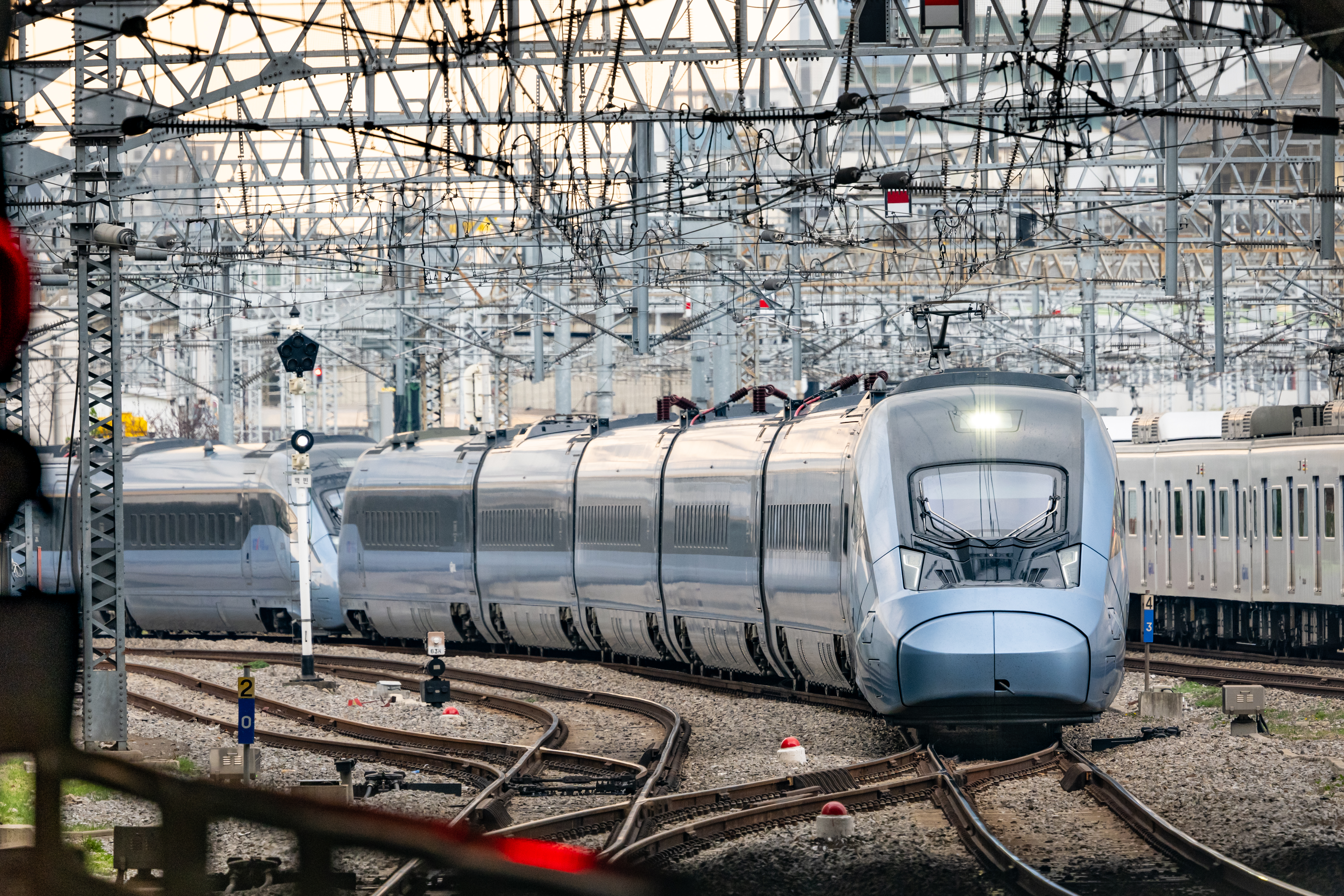
A KTX-Eum train at Yongsan station.

KTX-Eum is South Korea's first high-speed electric multiple unit train, being a commercialized version of the experimental HEMU-430X previously tested by Korail. It has a maximum service speed of 260 km/h (160 mph) and is aimed at serving semi-high-speed railway lines.

The KTX-Eum entered service on Jungang Line on January 4, 2021, operating between electrified section of Cheongnyangni and Andong. It was also introduced on Gangneung Line since August 1, 2021, replacing KTX-Sancheon which would be redeployed to other KTX lines. A further order of 14 six-car units was placed in December 2016, both orders are to be delivered in 2020–2021.

=== KTX-Cheongryong ===
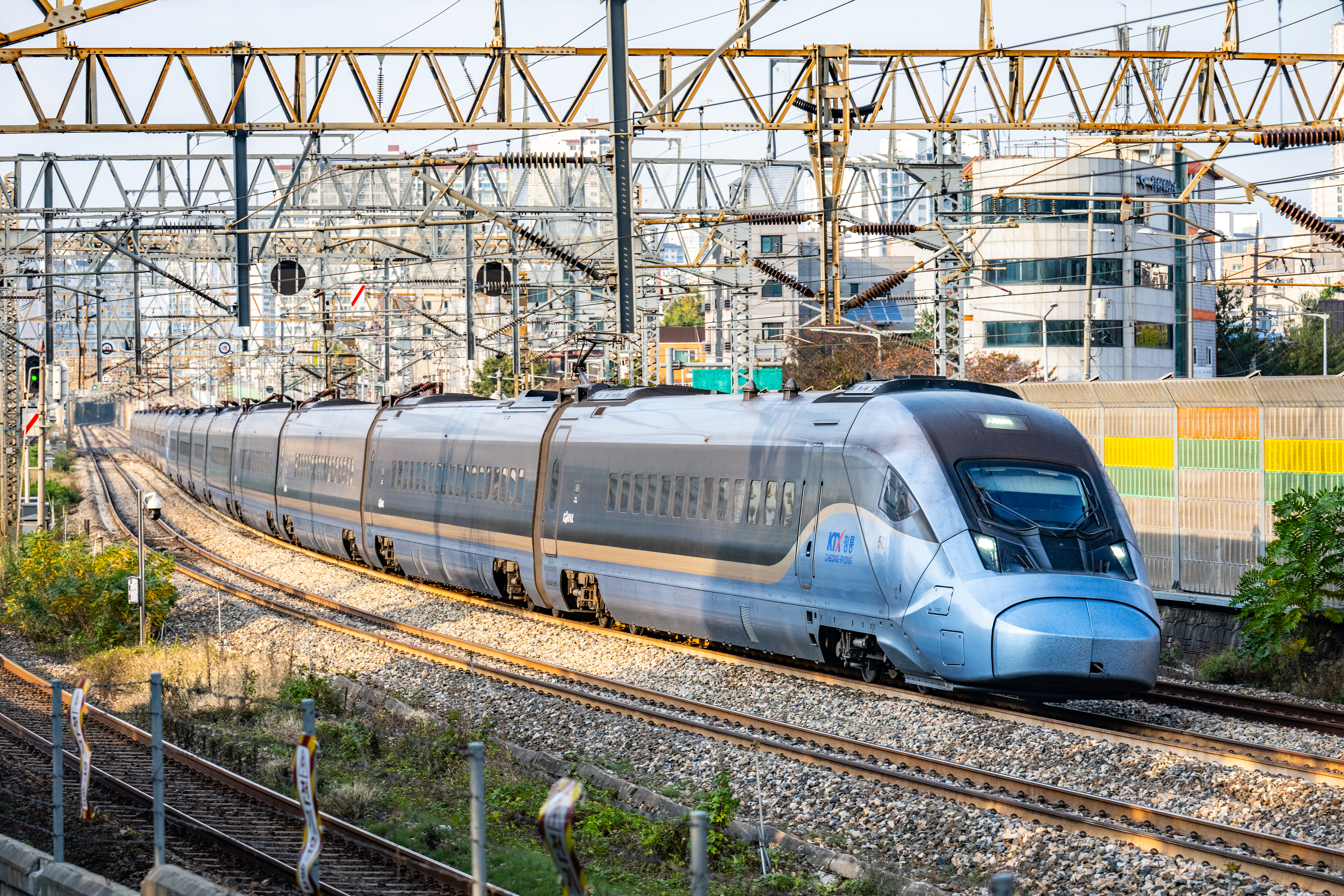
A KTX-Cheongryong train, Guro, Seoul.

KTX-Cheongryong is a sister train of KTX-Eum, but a trainset consists of eight cars as opposed to six cars. It has the maximum service speed of 320 km/h (200 mph) and is aimed for supplementing trainsets for current high-speed rail services.

In 2016, a contract was concluded between Korail and Hyundai Rotem to build 2 pre-series sets of KTX-Cheongryong. These trainsets entered service on the Gyeongbu high-speed railway and Honam high-speed railway on May 1, 2024.

Another 17 trainsets ordered by Korail are scheduled to be delivered between April 2027 and March 2028.

== List of KTX lines ==
=== Current lines ===
The table below list tracks in use by KTX service, including both newly constructed high speed lines, and improved/pre-existing lines.

Line	Section	Length		Opened	Operating speed	
Line	Section	km	mi	Opened	kph	mph
Gyeongbu HSR	Gwangmyeong – Sindong Interconnection	223.6	138.9	April 1, 2004	305	190
Gyeongbu HSR	Dongdaegu – Busan	122.8	76.3	November 1, 2010	305	190
Gyeongbu HSR	Daejeon South Interconnection – Okcheon Interconnection; Sindong Interconnection – Daegu West Interconnection	45.3	28.1	August 1, 2015	130	80
Gyeongui Line	Haengsin – Seoul	14.9	9.3	April 1, 2004	90	56
Gyeongbu Line	Seoul – Daejeon	166.3	103.3	April 1, 2004	160	99
Gyeongbu Line	Dongdaegu – Busan	115.4	71.7	April 1, 2004	160	99
Honam Line	Daejeon Interconnection – Seodaejeon – Iksan	87.9	54.6	April 1, 2004	180	112
Honam Line	GwangjuSongjeong – Mokpo	66.8	41.5	April 1, 2004	180	112
Suseo–Pyeongtaek HSR	Suseo – PyeongtaekJije	61.1	38.0	December 9, 2016	305	190
Gyeongjeon Line	Mijeon Interconnection – Masan	42.0	26.1	December 15, 2010	160	99
Gyeongjeon Line	Masan – Jinju	49.3	30.6	December 15, 2012	160	99
Jeolla Line	Iksan – Yeosu-Expo	180.4	112.1	October 5, 2011	200	124
Honam HSR	Osong – Gwangju-Songjeong	182.3	113.3	April 2, 2015	305	190
Donghae Line	Geoncheon Interconnection – Pohang	38.4	23.9	April 2, 2015	200	124
Donghae Line	Gyeongju – Bujeon	106.6	66.2	December 20, 2024	150	93.2
Jungang Line	Cheongnyangni – Seowonju	86.4	53.7	December 22, 2017	230	143
Jungang Line	Seowonju – Gyeongju	253.4	157.5	January 5, 2021	250	155
Gyeonggang Line	Seowonju – Gangneung	120.3	74.8	December 22, 2017	250	155
Yeongdong Line	Namgangneung – Donghae	43.2	26.8	March 2, 2020	110	68
Jungbunaeryuk Line	Pangyo – Mungyeong	136.4	84.7	December 31, 2021	230	143

=== Future lines ===
Line	Section	Length		Opening	Operating speed	
Line	Section	km	mi	Opening	kph	mph
Gyeongjeon Line	Masan – Bujeon	50.8	31.6	2022 (Planned)	200	124
Honam HSR	Gomagwon – Imseong-ri (via Muan International Airport)	77.6	48.2	2023 (Planned)	TBA	
Incheon KTX Line	Songdo – Maesong Interconnection	44.6	27.7	2025 (Planned)	TBA	
Suwon KTX Line	Suwon – PyeongtaekJije	29.8	18.5	2025 (Planned)	TBA	
Nambunaeryuk Line	Gimcheon – Geoje	191.1	118.7	2028 (Planned)		

=== Defunct lines ===
Most of the lines included in the following table are conventional tracks that were used for through-running before dedicated high speed track became available and KTX trains switch over.

The AREX connection to Incheon airport was axed due to low through traffic, therefore the through-running arrangement of KTX trains into the airport got terminated.

Line	Section	Length		Opened	Closed	Operating speed	
Line	Section	km	mi	Opened	Closed	kph	mph
Gyeongbu Line	Daejeon – Dongdaegu	160.0	99.4	June 1, 2007	November 1, 2010	160	99
Gwangju Line	Songjeong Interconnection – Gwangju	13.7	8.5	April 1, 2004	April 1, 2015	100	62
Honam Line	Iksan – Gwangju-Songjeong	97.8	60.8	April 1, 2004	April 1, 2015	180	112
AREX	Susaek Interconnection – Incheon Int'l Airport	45.3	28.1	June 30, 2014	July 30, 2018	160	99

== Operation ==
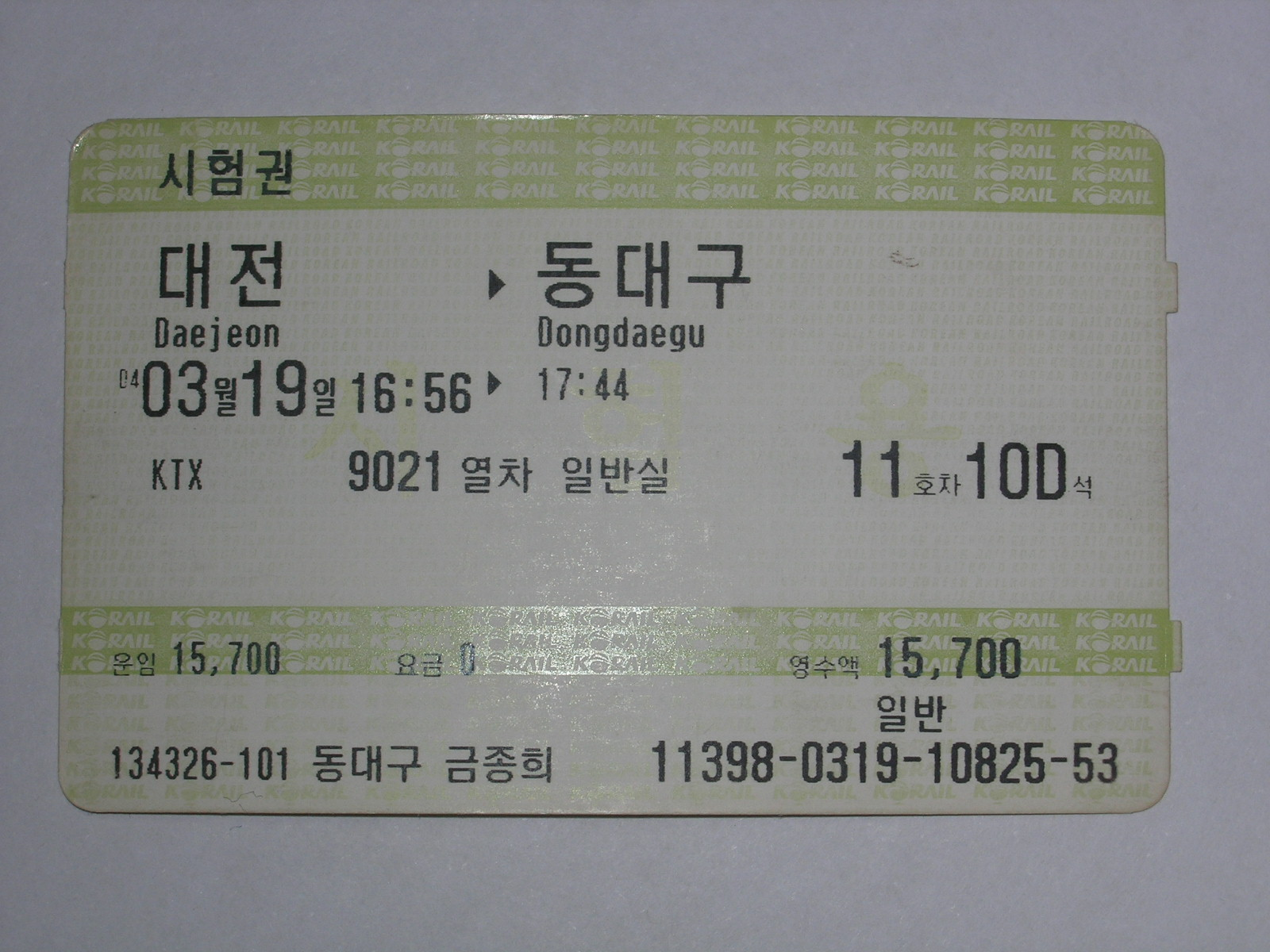
Test ticket for KTX trial run.

Following a phase of test operation, regular KTX service started on April 1, 2004, with a maximum speed of 300 km/h (186 mph) achieved along the finished sections of the Gyeongbu HSR. In response to frequent passenger complaints regarding speeds on the video display staying just below the advertised 300 mark, operating top speed was raised to 305 km/h (190 mph) on November 26, 2007.

=== Services ===
Services		Train #	Daily Freq. (2021)	Route
Gyeongbu KTX	HSR route	00x/18x	39–48	(Haengsin) – Seoul – Gwangmyeong – Daejeon – Dongdaegu – Ulsan – Busan
Gyeongbu KTX	via Gupo	10x/16x	6–8	(HSR route until Dongdaegu) – Miryang – Gupo – Busan
Gyeongbu KTX	via Suwon	12x/17x	4–6	Seoul – Yeongdeungpo – Suwon – (HSR route toward Busan)
Gyeongjeon KTX		20x/28x	12–16	(Gyeongbu HSR until Dongdaegu) – Miryang – Changwon – Masan – Jinju
Donghae KTX		23x/29x	14–15	(Gyeongbu HSR until Dongdaegu) – Pohang
Honam KTX	HSR route	40x/49x	20–21	(Haengsin) – Yongsan – Gwangmyeong – Gongju – Iksan – GwangjuSongjeong – Mokpo
Honam KTX	via Seodaejeon	47x/48x	7	(Gyeongbu HSR until Osong) – Seodaejeon – Gyeryong – Nonsan – Iksan (– Gimje – Mokpo / 2x daily)
Suseo–Pyeongtaek KTX	HSR route	3xx/6xx	40/20	Suseo - Dongtan - PyeongtaekJije - Cheonan–Asan (Then via Gyeongbu HSR or Honam HSR)
Suseo–Pyeongtaek KTX	via Gyeongbu HSR	3xx	40	Suseo – Daejeon – Dongdaegu – Ulsan – Busan
Suseo–Pyeongtaek KTX	via Honam HSR	6xx	20	Suseo – Gongju – Iksan – GwangjuSongjeong – Mokpo
Jeolla KTX	HSR route	50x/54x	12–14	(Honam HSR route until Iksan) – Jeonju – Yeosu-Expo
Jeolla KTX	via Seodaejeon	58x	3–4	(Honam route via Seodaejeon until Iksan) – Iksan – Jeonju (– Yeosu-Expo / 2x daily)
Jungang KTX		70x	7–8	Cheongnyangni – Wonju – Jecheon – Yeongju – Andong
Gangneung KTX	Gyeonggang route	80x/85x	14–21	(Seoul) – Cheongnyangni – Manjong – Pyeongchang – Jinbu – Gangneung
Gangneung KTX	Yeongdong route	84x/88x	4–7	(Gyeonggang route until Jinbu) – Jeongdongjin – Donghae

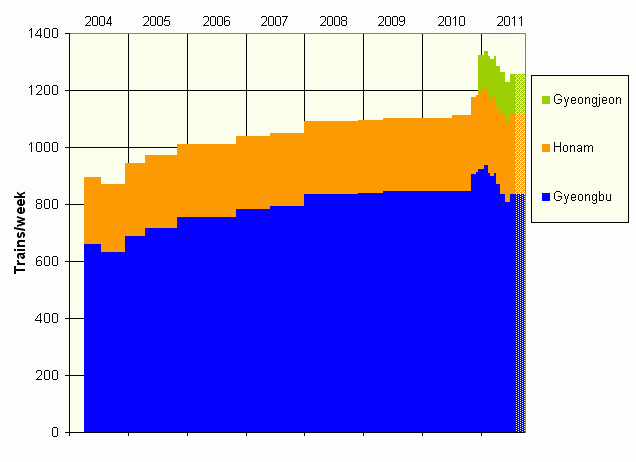
Frequency of KTX services .(trains/week)

KTX services are grouped according to their route, and within the groups, the stopping pattern changes from train to train. KTX trains not deviating from the Seoul–Busan corridor are operated as the Gyeongbu KTX service. In 2004, the new service cut the route length from 441.7 to 408.5 km (274.5 to 253.8 mi), and the fastest trains, serving four stations only, cut the minimum Seoul–Busan travel time from the Saemaul's 4 hours 10 minutes to 2 hours 40 minutes. With the extension of the Gyeongbu HSR, from November 1, 2010, the minimum Seoul–Busan travel time reduced to 2 hours 18 minutes, over a travel distance of 423.8 km (263.3 mi). From December 1, 2010, Korail added a pair of non-stop trains with a travel time of 2 hours 8 minutes. Once the sections across Daejeon and Daegu are completed, cutting the Seoul–Busan travel distance to 417.5 km (259.4 mi), plans foresee a further improvement of the four-stop travel time to 2 hours and 10 minutes.

Because both KTX and conventional trains in South Korea share a rail gauge (unlike in Japan), KTX trains can run on both networks dramatically increasing the number of destinations served.

Some Gyeongbu KTX services use parts of the conventional line paralleling the high-speed line. From June 2007 until October 2010, some trains left the Gyeongbu HSR between Daejeon and Dongdaegu to serve Gimcheon and Gumi before the opening of an extra station for the two cities on the high-speed line. From November 1, 2010, when most Gyeongbu KTX services began to use the new Daegu–Busan high-speed section, some trains remained on the Gyeongbu Line on that section, and additional trains began to use the Gyeongbu Line on the Seoul–Daejeon section to serve Suwon.

KTX trains using the Gyeongbu HSR only from Seoul to Daejeon and continuing all along the Honam Line are operated as the Honam KTX service. In 2004, the new service with a route length of 404.5 km (251.3 mi) between Yongsan in Seoul and Mokpo cut minimum travel time from 4 hours 42 minutes to 2 hours 58 minutes. By 2017, this time is to be cut further to 1 hour 46 minutes.

On December 15, 2010, the new Gyeongjeon KTX service started with a minimum travel time of 2 hours 54 minutes over the 401.4 km (249.4 mi) long route between Seoul and Masan. The service is to be extended to Jinju by 2012. A fourth line, the Jeolla KTX service will connect Seoul to Yeosu in 3 hours 7 minutes from September 2011. From 2014, with the completion of the first phase of the Honam HSR, the travel time is reduced further to 2 hours 25 minutes. From 2015, KTX trains are to reach Pohang from Seoul in 1 hour 50 minutes.

=== Tickets and seats ===
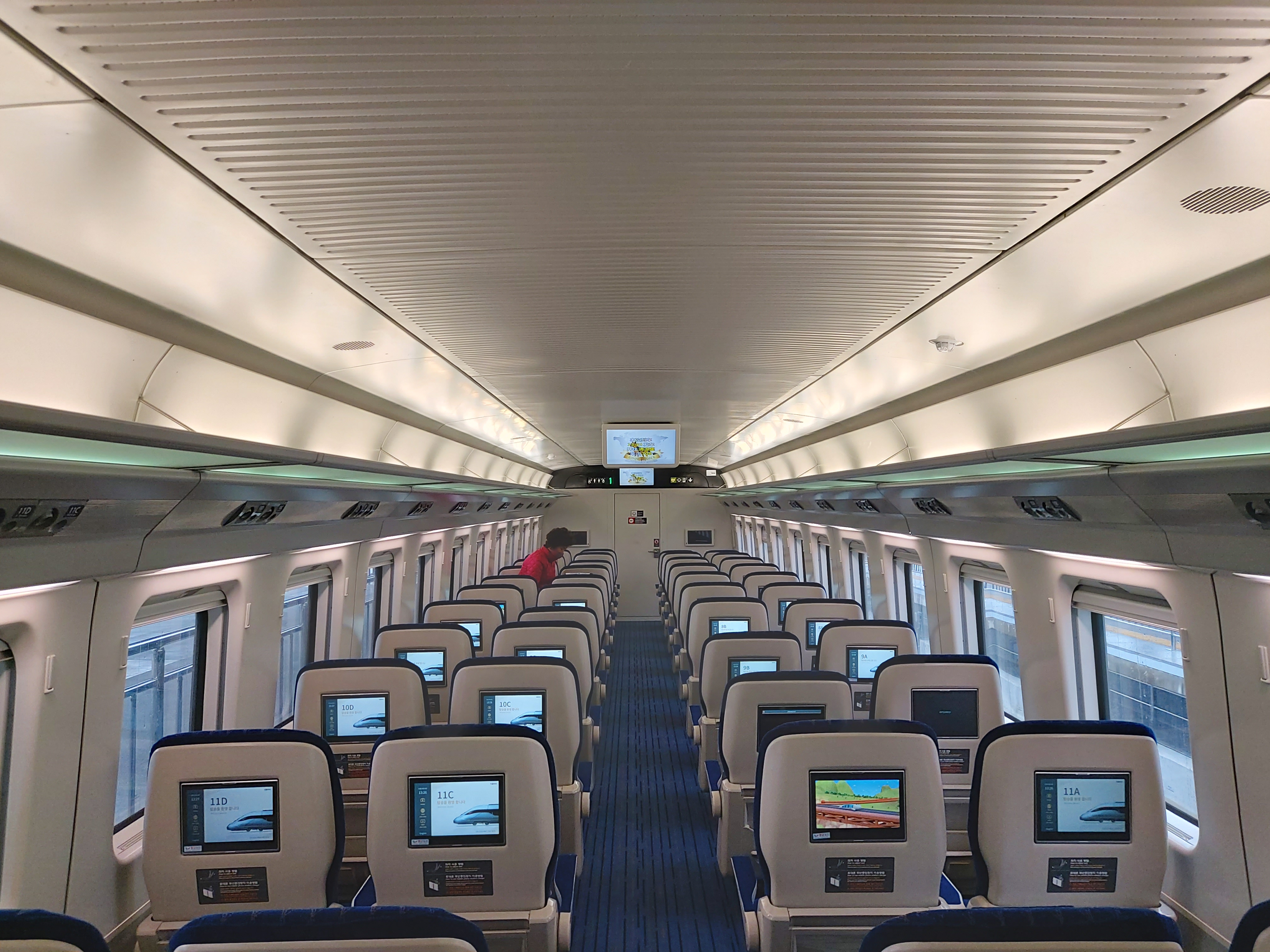
KTX-Eum's Superior Class.

==== Type of seats ====
KTX-I and KTX-Sancheon offer First Class and Standard Class, while KTX-Eum and Cheongryong offer Superior Class and Standard Class.Tickets also specify whether a seat is forward-facing or backward-facing according to the direction of travel. First Class seats are arranged 2+1 across the train and Standard Class seats are configured 2+2. There are special reserved Family seats, which are grouped in four, including 2 forward-facing and 2 backward-facing seats. There are reserved seats and unassigned seats. KTX trains have no restaurant cars or bars, only seat service. From 2006, one car of selected KTX services functions as a moving cinema.

==== Ticket prices ====
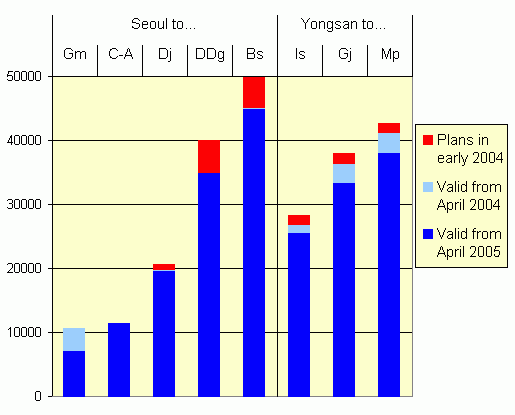
Differential fare reductions before and after the launch of KTX service.

KTX fares were designed to be about halfway between those for conventional trains and airline tickets. The fare system implemented at the start of service in April 2004 deviated from prices proportional to distance, to favor long-distance trips. On April 25, 2005, fares were selectively reduced for relations under-performing most.

Seoul-Busan Standard Class fares one-way, reserved, for adults; November 1, 2010
Service	Mon-Thu	Fri-Sat
KTX	51,800 won	55,500 won
KTX (via Miryang)	47,900 won	51,200 won
KTX (via Suwon)	42,100 won	45,000 won
Saemaul	39,300 won	41,100 won
Mugunghwa	26,500 won	27,700 won

From November 1, 2006, due to rising energy prices, Korail applied an 8-10% fare hike for various train services, including 9.5% for KTX. The price of a Seoul-Busan Standard Class ticket increased to 48,100 won. From July 1, 2007, KTX fares were hiked another 6.5%, while those for the slower Saemaeul and Mugunghwa services on the parallel conventional route were raised by 3.5 percent and 2.5 percent, respectively. However, new reduced weekday and unassigned seat fares were also introduced.

After the November 1, 2010, start of service on the Daegu–Busan section of the Gyeongbu HSR, the fare for KTX trains using the new section was set about 8% higher than for the old route via Miryang, while that for the new services via Suwon was set lower.

==== Discounts ====
Korail's standard discounts for children, disabled, seniors and groups apply on KTX trains, too. For frequent travellers, Korail's standard discount cards, which are categorized according to age group, apply with the double of the standard discount rates; while discount cards for business and government agency workers apply with the normal rate; both types of discounts are up to 30%. Season period tickets with discounts of up to 60% can also apply to KTX trains.

Discounts for family seats (37.5%) and backward facing seats (5%) are specific to the KTX. In addition to Korail's small general discounts for tickets purchased in a vending machine, via cell phone or the internet, discounts of 5–20% apply to a limited number of seats on KTX trains when purchased in advance. For travelers who transfer to other long-distance trains towards destinations beyond KTX stops, transfer tickets with 30% discount apply. Korail pays a refund for late KTX trains, which reaches 100% for trains with a delay above one hour.

Korea Rail Pass, a period ticket Korail offers to foreigners, also applies to KTX. For passengers using the Korea-Japan Joint Rail Pass, a joint offer of Korail, Japanese railways and ferry services, the discount on KTX trains is 30%.

=== Passenger numbers and usage ===
==== Forecasts ====
Forecast made in...	KTX opening year ridership forecast in passengers/day		
Forecast made in...	Gyeongbu	Honam	Total
1991	196,402	-	196,402
1995	190,203	-	190,203
Dec 1998; Nov 1999	141,497	22,818	164,315
Aug 2003	115,828	36,085	151,913

When the project was launched, KTX was expected to become one of the world's busiest high-speed lines. The first study in 1991 forecast around 200,000 passengers a day in the first year of operation, growing to 330,000 passengers a day twelve years later. In forecasts prepared after the decision to split the project into two phases, the expected first year ridership of Gyeongbu KTX services was reduced by about 40%. With the estimate for the Honam KTX services added to the plan, opening year forecasts ranged between 150,000 and 175,000 passengers a day. Actual initial ridership after the opening of the first phase in 2004 was well short of initial expectations at around half of the final forecast.

In October 2010, before the opening of the second phase, Korail expected ridership to rise from the then current 106,000 to 135,000 passengers a day.

==== Ridership evolution ====
Average daily ridership, 2004 to 2013, for 2014: 56.9 mln, 2015: 60.5 mln, 2016: 64.6 mln annual

KTX was introduced on 1 April 2004. In the first 100 days, daily passenger numbers averaged 70,250, generating an operational revenue of about 2.11 billion won per day, 54% of what was expected. On January 14, 2005, Prime Minister Lee Hae Chan stated that "the launch of KTX was a classic policy failure" due to construction costs significantly above and passenger numbers well below forecasts. However, ridership increased by over a third on the Gyeongbu KTX and over a half on the Honam KTX in two years. Financial break-even was forecast at a ridership level of around 100,000 passengers a day, which was expected by the end of 2006.

The 100 millionth rider was carried after 1116 days of operation on April 22, 2007, when cumulative income stood at 2.78 trillion won. KTX finances moved into the black in 2007. The next year, with revenues equal to US$898 million and costs equal to US$654 million, KTX was Korail's most profitable branch.

By the sixth anniversary in April 2010, KTX trains travelled a total 122.15 million kilometres, carrying 211.01 million passengers. Punctuality gradually improved from 86.7% of trains arriving within 5 minutes of schedule in 2004 to 98.3% in 2009. In 2009, the average daily ridership was 102,700. As of April 2010, the single-day ridership record stood at 178,584 passengers, achieved on January 26, 2009, the Korean New Year.

By the tenth anniversary KTX had travelled a total 240 million kilometres, carrying 414 million passengers.

==== Market share and effect ====
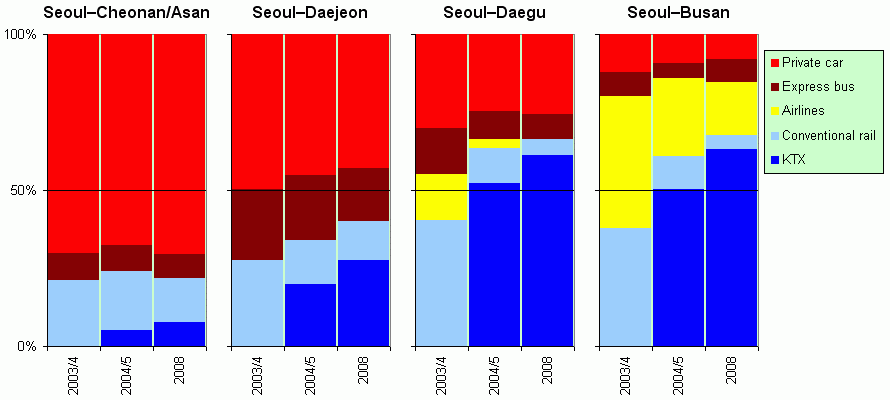
Gyeongbu corridor

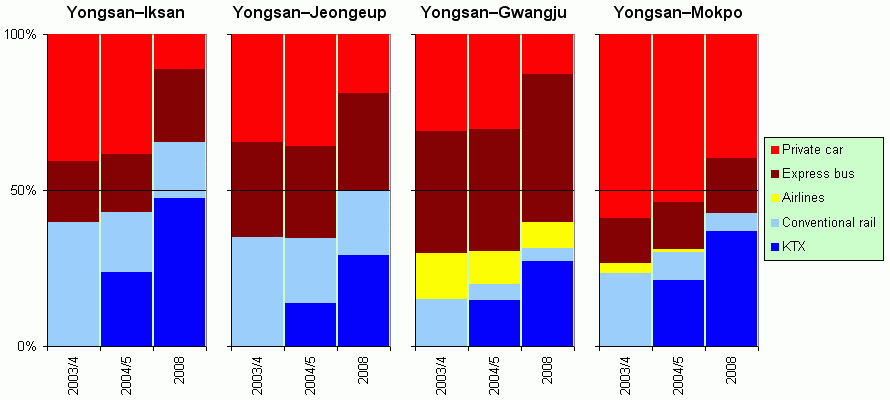
Honam corridor

Evolution of modal shares on selected relations with KTX service

The introduction of high-speed services had the strongest effect on long-distance relations with a significant portion of the journey on the high-speed line, like Seoul–Busan: KTX took both the majority of the market and the bulk of rail passengers in the first year already, increasing the total share of rail from around two-fifths to a market dominating two-thirds by 2008. On long-distance relations with significant distances along conventional lines and resulting more modest travel time gains, that is along the Honam Line, the KTX and overall rail market share gain decreases with distance. On medium-distance relations like Seoul–Daejeon, KTX gained market share mostly at the expense of normal rail express services and air traffic and helped to increase the total share of rail. On short-distance intercity relations line Seoul–Cheonan, due to the modest gains in time and the location of KTX stops outside city cores, KTX gains were at the expense of conventional rail, while intercity rail's modal share was little changed.

By 2007, provincial airports suffered from deficits after a drop in the number of passengers attributed to the KTX. With lower ticket prices, by 2008, KTX has swallowed up around half of the airlines' previous demand between Seoul and Busan (falling from 5.3 million passengers in 2003 to 2.4 million). Though some low-cost carriers failed and withdrew from the route, others still planned to enter competition even at the end of 2008. Budget airlines achieved a 5.6% growth in August 2009 over the same month a year earlier while KTX ridership decreased by 1.3%, a trend change credited to the opening of Seoul Subway Line 9, which improved Gimpo International Airport's connection to southern Seoul.

In the first two months after the launch of the second phase of the Gyeongbu HSR, passenger numbers on flights between Gimpo and Ulsan Airports dropped 35.4% compared to the same period a year earlier, those between Gimpo and Pohang Airports 13.2%. Between Gimpo Airport and Busan's Gimhae International Airport, airline passenger numbers remained stable (+0.2%), as a consequence of a budget airline competing with large discounts and aggressive marketing. In the first month of Gyeongjeon KTX service, express bus services between Seoul and Masan or Changwon experienced 30–40% drops in ridership.

=== Technical and operational issues ===
==== State of infrastructure ====
Lawmakers criticized the safety of Korail's tunnels after the Ministry of Construction and Transportation submitted data to the National Assembly on June 13, 2005. The ministry added fire prevention standards to high-speed line design standards only in November 2003, thus they weren't applied to the by then finished tunnels of the first phase of KTX. Consequently, few tunnels had emergency exits, and in high-speed railway tunnels, the average walking distance in case of an emergency was 973 m (3,192 ft), with a maximum of 3,086 m (10,125 ft), against a norm of emergency exits every 500 m (1,640 ft) in other countries. A contingency plan for fires in KTX tunnels was incorporated into a national disaster manual in November 2005.

On October 5, 2008, it was revealed by lawmakers that inside Hwanghak Tunnel, from December 2004, inspectors have monitored the progression of several cracks and minor track displacements, which continued after maintenance work in March–April 2007 and again in March 2008. The operator claimed that a February 2007 on-site inspection found the problems not safety-relevant, but pledged further maintenance, and an investigation into the causes was launched. Tunnel reinforcement was under way in 2010.

==== Incidents and accidents ====
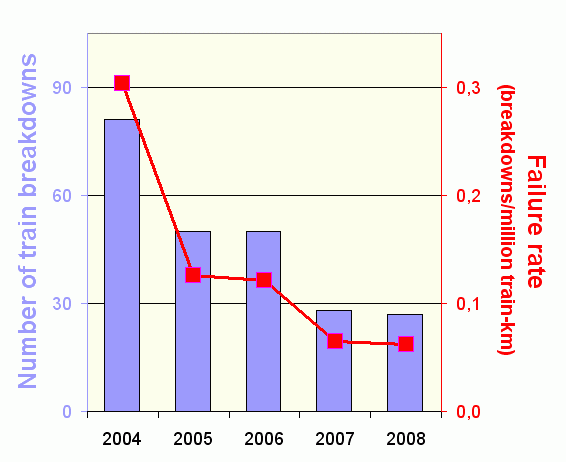
Annual number of breakdowns and failure rate

Operational irregularities mostly concerned the rolling stock, but also signalling, power glitches, and track problems. The number of incidents decreased from 28 in the first month to 8 in the fifth. The failure rate decreased sharply by the fifth year of operation. Later, in the first eight months of regular service until October 2010, KTX-II trains broke down 12 times. Causes for breakdowns in the first years of operation involved inexperienced staff and insufficient inspection during maintenance.

Lawmakers from the Grand National Party published an investigation in October 2006 and expressed concern about the practice to use parts from other trains for spare parts, but Korail stated that that is standard practice in case of urgency with no safety effect, and the supply of spare parts is secured. Korail is also conducting a localisation program to develop replacements for two dozen imported parts.

On June 13, 2007, near Cheongdo on the upgraded Daegu–Busan section, a damper acting between two cars of a KTX train got free at one end due to a loose screw and hit the trackbed, throwing up ballast that hit cars and caused bruises to two people on the parallel road, until the train was stopped when passengers noticed smoke.

On November 3, 2007, an arriving KTX-I train collided with a parked KTX-I train inside Busan Station, resulting in material damage of 10 billion won and light injuries to two persons. The accident happened because the driver had fallen asleep and disabled the train protection system, and led to the trial and conviction of the driver. The railway union criticized single driver operation in conjunction with the two and a half hours rest time the driver had between shifts.

On February 11, 2011, a KTX-Sancheon train bound for Seoul from Busan derailed on a switch in a tunnel 500 m (1,600 ft) before Gwangmyeong Station, when travelling at around 90 km/h (56 mph). No casualties were reported, only one passenger suffered slight injury, but KTX traffic was blocked for 29 hours while repairs were completed. Preliminary investigation indicated that the accident resulted from a series of human errors. Because workers improperly repaired a point along the tracks. Investigators found that the derailment was caused by a switch malfunction triggered by a loose nut from track, and suspected that a repairman failed to tighten it during maintenance the previous night. The switch's detectors signaled a problem earlier, however, a second maintenance crew failed to find the loose nut and didn't properly communicate the fact to the control center, which then allowed the train on the track. The rail union criticized Korail's use of hired repairmen. there were no problems with the train according to investigation.

On July 15, 2011, 150 passengers were evacuated from a train when smoke started coming out of the train when it arrived at Miryang station at 11:30 AM. On July 17, 2011, at around 11 AM, a train stopped abruptly and stranded some 400 passengers in the 9.975 km (6.198 mi) Hwanghak Tunnel for over an hour. The train resumed service after emergency repairs to a malfunctioning motor. A Korail spokesperson stated that the reason for the stop was due to "faults in the motor block that supplies power to the wheels". The same day, the air conditioning broke down on another train leaving Busan at 1:45 PM. Over 800 passengers were transferred to another train at Daejeon when the problem could not be fixed.

On December 7, 2018, a KTX train carrying 198 passengers derailed about five minutes after leaving Gangneung for Seoul, injuring 15 passengers. The train was traveling at about 103 km/h when almost all of its cars left the rails.

On January 5, 2022, a KTX-Sancheon train bound for Busan from Seoul carrying 303 passengers and crew derailed at 12:58 PM while passing a tunnel in Yeongdong of North Chungcheong Province, about 215 kilometers south of Seoul, injuring 7 passengers. The train was traveling at about 200 km/h when it partially derailed, resulting in a bogie wheel from car number 4 running off the track before being violently ejected from the train, throwing up ballast and causing structural damage to train cars. Subsequent KTX traffic was rerouted via the standard line, resulting in severe delays. Initially, it was believed that the derailment was caused by the train colliding with debris while passing Yeongdong Tunnel. However, evidence gathered from further investigation shows that the missing bogie wheel was found inside Otan Tunnel, which is about 4 km before Yeongdong Tunnel, leading the investigating team to believe the train derailed due to faults within the wheel bogie assembly rather than from impact with debris.

==== Passenger comfort and convenience ====
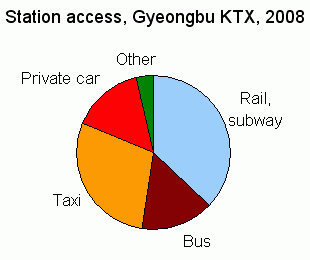
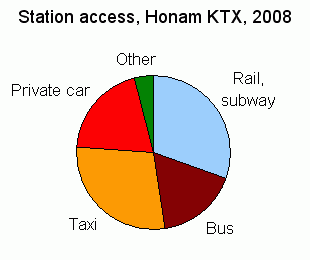

Passenger surveys in the first months found that the limited capacity of bus connections and the lack of subway connections for intermediate stations, especially the newly built stations Gwangmyeong and Cheonan-Asan, was the problem mentioned most often. A better connection to Cheonan-Asan Station was provided by an extension of Seoul Subway Line 1 along the Janghang Line, opened on December 14, 2008. Gwangmyeong Station was linked to the same subway line by a shuttle service on December 15, 2006, but it made little impact due to the longtime differences between KTX and subway train schedules.

The noise level in the trains during tunnel passages was also subject to passenger complaints. This was referred to as a tunnel effect; it referred to both noise and vibration of the train when traveling through two specific tunnels. The tunnel effect was specifically noted as a reason for passenger dissatisfaction. Sound waves that are generally dispersed in an open environment are reflected against the tunnel walls, which causes the sound waves to come in contact with the passenger cabin and produces noise.

A reduction by 3–4 dB was achieved by retrofitting all trains with longer mud flaps at car ends until May 2006 to smooth the airflow at the articulated car joints. However, measurements in 2009 found significantly higher interior noise levels at some locations in two tunnels. Window thickness and sound insulation was improved in the KTX-II. The rails for high-speed trains like the KTX are welded together via a special techniques that make the rail a solid continuous rail; this method reduces the noise volume, which is produced by the wheels' contact with the rail, but it is not eliminated.

The isolation of KTX-I trains against pressure variations during tunnel passages was insufficient for some passengers, leading to efforts to reinforce pressurization in newer generations of trains. Pressure variations have been known to cause passengers to experience ringing in their ears; the ventilation systems on the passenger cabins are sealed when the train enters a tunnel in order to reduce the pressure changes. Pressure variations were not the only train cabin-associated complaint; KTX passengers were also known to have been negatively affected by inconsistent speeds of the trains.

Some KTX passengers found high-speed travel in backwards facing seats dizzying. Along with dizziness, feelings of nausea, headache, and sleepiness could also be experienced. Motion sickness was also noted as having had a minimal effect on KTX passengers; however, it still made an impact on passenger ride comfort. When the original seats were selected for the KTX trains, the anthropometry of the main consumers, who were largely expected to be Korean, were not considered. The seat design was found to have a significant effect on how passengers on the KTX trains rated the experience of their trip. Among the various factors that were considered to be vectors of discomfort were the angle of joints and specific areas of pressure, which were discovered to be present after an analysis of questionnaires that were completed by recent passengers. The factors of the seats of concern to KTX passengers were the shape, pitch, width, and the amount of legroom between the rows of seats. Swivel seats, which can be turned into the direction of travel, installed only on First Class in KTX-I trains, were made standard on both classes on newer generations of trains.

Studies have shown that term "ride comfort" has been used as an all-encompassing term for the KTX passengers' over all experience on the trains. While the KTX train is based on the French TGV model, it is considered to be more comfortable. The passengers' overall experience with regards to over-all ride comfort has been looked at as a combination of their physical health and emotional state. Fares were not included in the aforementioned questionnaires on ride comfort as there were variations in pricing due to seat arrangement, as well as weekday/weekend rates.

== International export ==
Railways using KTX technology are not limited to those in South Korea.

In June 2024, South Korea and Uzbekistan concluded a KRW 270 billion (approximately US$196 million) deal to apply KTX technology in Uzbekistan by supplying high-speed trains and Korail expertise. This is the first time KTX technology was exported. As part of the deal, 6 sets of trains (of 7 cars each) known as UTY EMU-250, which is a variant of KTX-Eum and capable of going up to 250 km/h (160 mph), are to be supplied for 1,216 km (756 mi) of rail in Uzbekistan. Operations are scheduled to begin in April 2027.

== See also ==
- Super Rapid Train (SRT)
- High-speed rail in South Korea
- ITX-Saemaeul
- ITX-Maum
- Mugunghwa-ho
- Nuriro
- Rail transport in South Korea
- Transport in South Korea
- Train to Busan, a horror film in which the KTX and its train feature heavily in the plot
