= Suncheon station =

Railway station in South Korea

순천
Suncheon
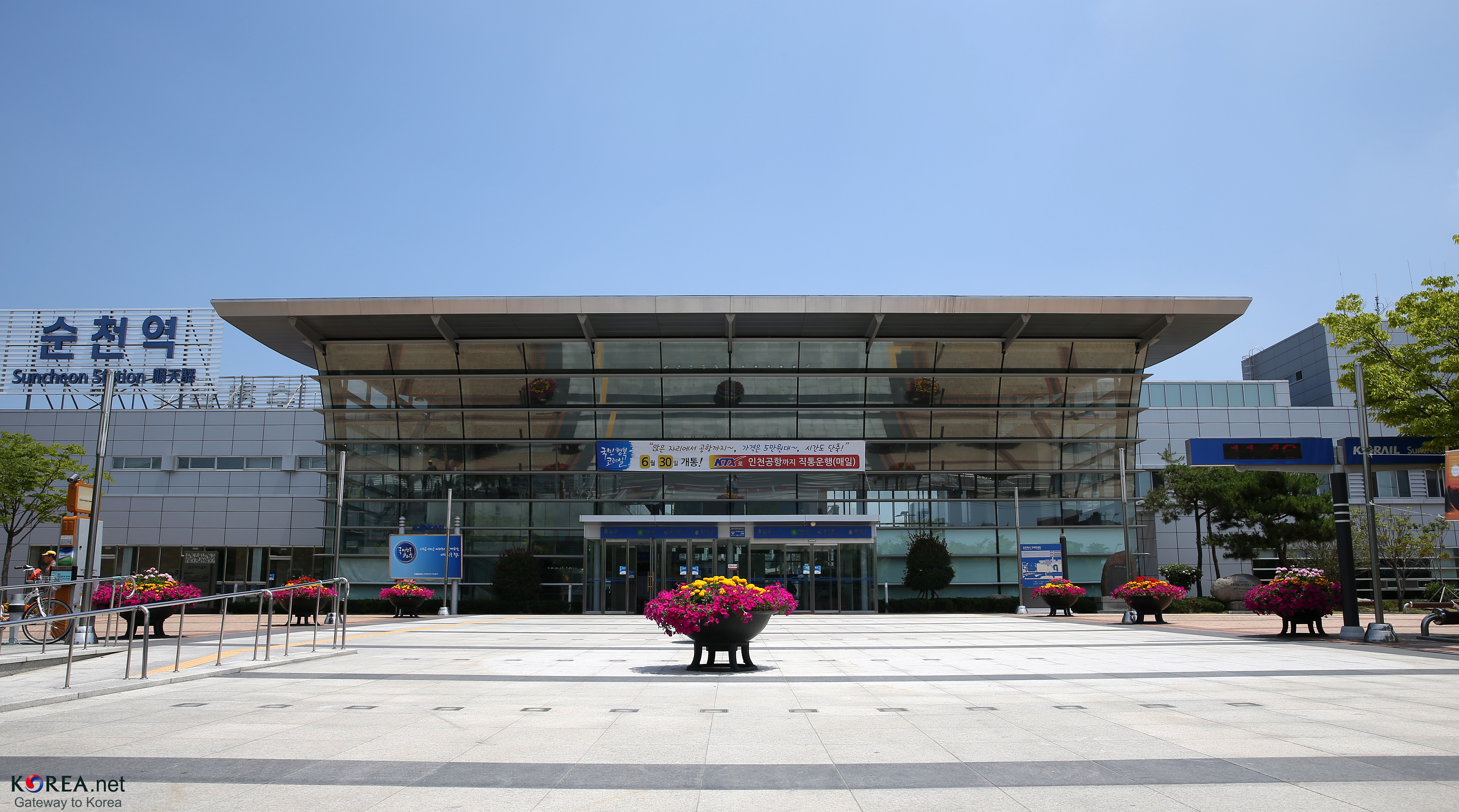
- Station building

Korean name
- Hangul: 순천역
- Hanja: 順天驛
- Revised Romanization: Suncheon-yeok
- McCune–Reischauer: Sunch'ŏn-yŏk

General information
- Location: South Korea
- Coordinates: 34°56′46.93″N 127°30′7.94″E
- Operator: Korail
- Line: Gyeongjeon Line

Construction
- Structure type: Aboveground

Services
Preceding station	Korea Train Express	Following station
Guryegu towards Haengsin, Suseo or Yongsan	Jeolla KTX	Yeocheon towards Yeosu-Expo
Preceding station	Korail	Following station
Guryegu towards Yongsan	ITX-Saemaeul Jeolla Line	Yeocheon towards Yeosu-Expo
Guryegu towards Yongsan	ITX-Maum Jeolla Line	Yeocheon towards Yeosu-Expo
Sinboseong towards Mokpo	Saemaeul-ho Mokpo–Boseong Line	Gwangyang towards Bujeon
Guryegu towards Yongsan	Mugunghwa-ho Jeolla Line	Yeocheon towards Yeosu-Expo
Gwangyang towards Bujeon	Mugunghwa-ho Gyeongjeon Line	Terminus
Terminus	Mugunghwa-ho Gyeongjeon Line	Beolgyo towards GwangjuSongjeong
Gwangyang towards Bujeon	Mugunghwa-ho Mokpo–Boseong Line	Beolgyo towards Mokpo
Guryegu towards Seoul	S-Train West	Yeocheon towards Yeosu-Expo
Hadong towards Busan	S-Train East	Beolgyo towards Mokpo
Location
- Location within South Korea

Suncheon station is a railway station in South Korea. It is on the Gyeongjeon Line and the Jeolla Line.
