= SRT (train) =

High-speed rail service in South Korea

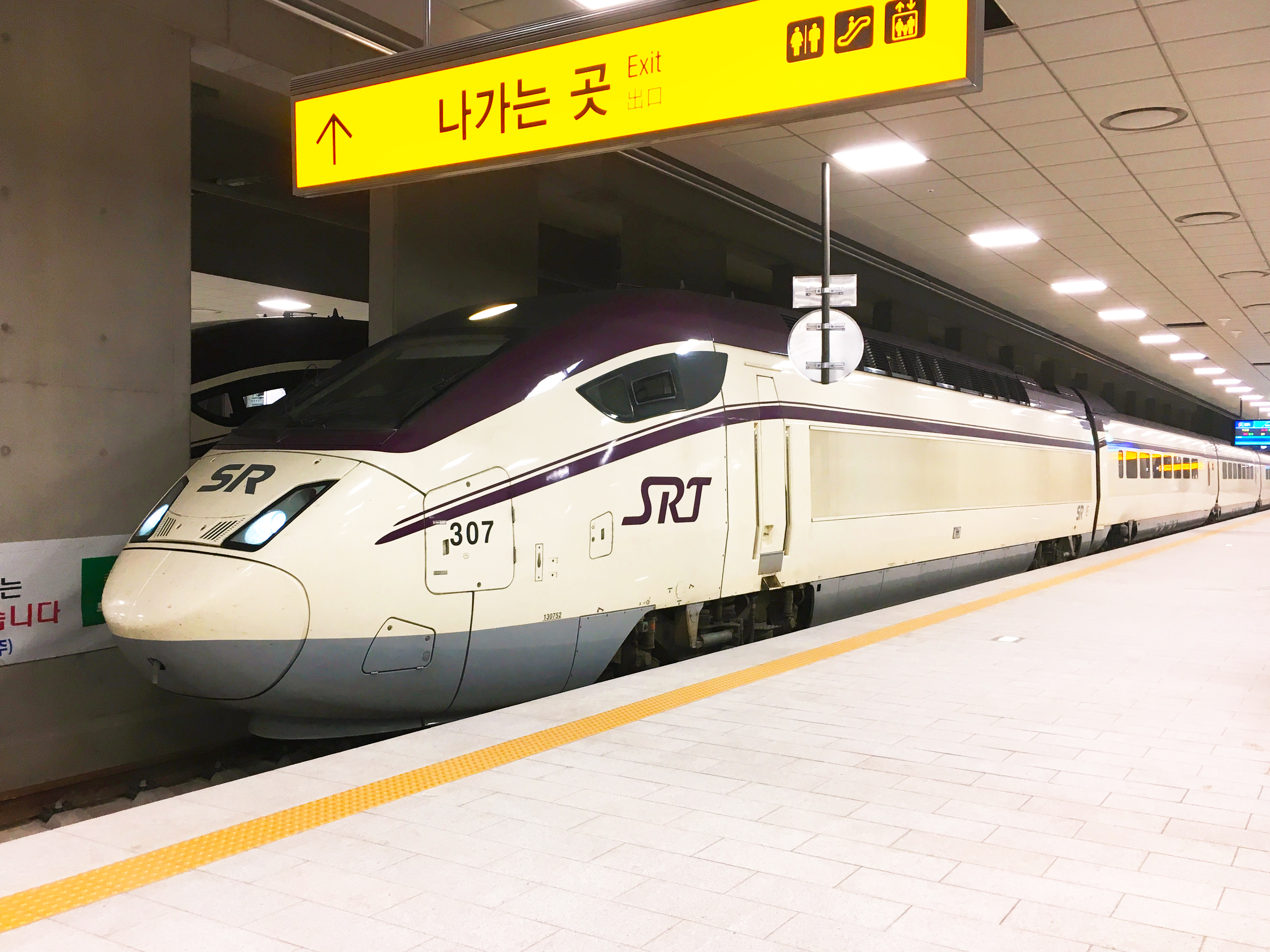
- SRT train in Suseo station

Overview
- Service type: Inter-city; high-speed rail
- Status: Operating
- Locale: South Korea
- First service: 9 December 2016; 9 years ago
- Last service: 31 August 2026; 2 months ago
- Successor: KTX (by merger)

Route
- Service frequency: Suseo–Busan (40x daily); Suseo–Mokpo (20x daily)
- Train numbers: 3xx (Suseo–Busan); 6xx (Suseo–Mokpo)
- Lines used: Gyeongbu HSR; Honam HSR; Suseo-Pyeongtaek HSR

On-board services
- Classes: First class; Standard class
- Disabled access: Fully accessible
- Catering facilities: Trolley service
- Entertainment facilities: Yes
- Baggage facilities: Yes

Technical
- Rolling stock: KTX-Sancheon Class 120000; KTX-Sancheon Class 130000
- Track gauge: 1,435 mm (4 ft 8 1/2 in) standard gauge
- Electrification: 25 kV/60 Hz overhead catenary
- Operating speed: Up to 305 km/h (190 mph)
Route map
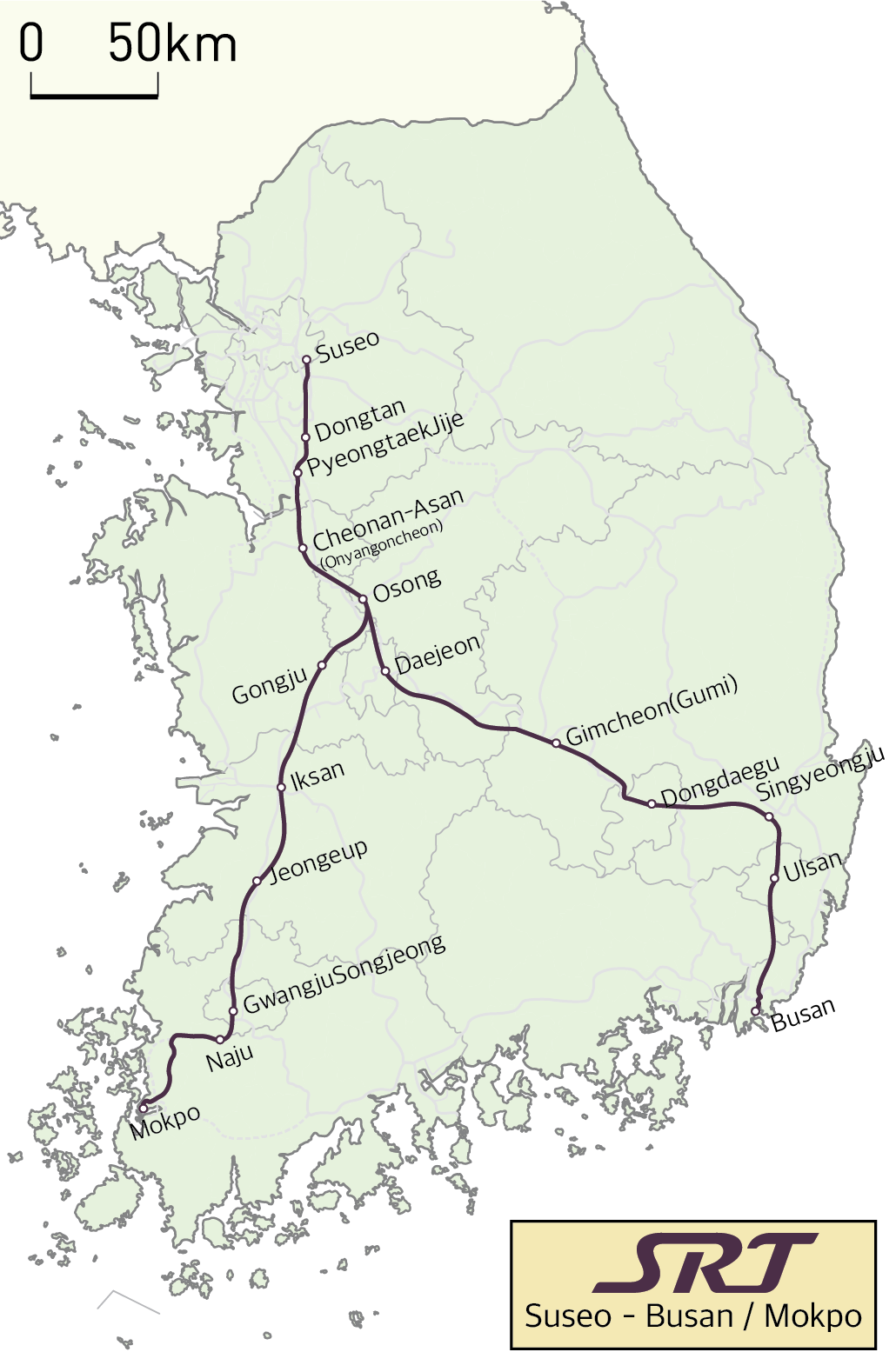

- SRT
- Hangul: 수서고속철도
- Hanja: 水西高速鐵道
- RR: Suseo gosok cheoldo
- MR: Susŏ kosok ch'ŏlto

The SRT was a high-speed rail service in South Korea operated by SR Corporation. The service started at Suseo station in southeast Seoul and terminated at either Busan station or Mokpo station.

Around 86% of the train service ran 50 meters underground between Suseo and Cheonan-Asan stations. Dongtan station, the first station after departing from Suseo, was the first underground high-speed railway station in Korea. The SRT ran the Seoul–Busan route 8 minutes faster than KTX as it travelled exclusively on the dedicated Suseo–Pyeongtaek, Gyeongbu and Honam HSR lines. The Suseo-Pyeongtaek HSR line was built exclusively for this service.

== Branding ==
Before the official announcement by SR, Ministry of Land, Infrastructure and Transport used the tentative term Suseo High-speed Railway (수서고속철도).

On October 12, 2015, SR proposed three candidate names for the new high-speed rail service – SRT (Super Rapid Train), HSR (High-speed train of SR), and SRH (SR High-speed train). SRT (Super Rapid Train) was chosen.

=== Merger ===
On 1 September 2026, the SRT was merged into the main KTX rail network, including operations, ticketing, and rolling stock.

== Electrification ==
The SRT operated 25 kV AC on the entire line and interconnection with Korail waz 1.5 kV DC. At Suseo station, the power comes from rigid overhead lines before transitioning to a 1500mm overhead catenary wire after leaving the station.

== Route ==
Legend

●	All trains stop
○	Some trains stop
△	Few trains stop

=== Suseo–Busan ===
Station	Distance (from Suseo)		Stopping
Station	km	mi	Stopping
Suseo	0.0	0.0	●
Dongtan	32.6	20.2	○
PyeongtaekJije	53.6	33.3	△
Cheonan–Asan	78.7	48.9	○
Osong	107.3	66.6	○
Daejeon	142.5	88.5	●
Gimcheon(Gumi)	216.3	134.4	△
Dongdaegu	269.4	167.3	●
Gyeongju	318.4	197.8	○
Ulsan	348.4	216.4	○
Busan	400.1	248.6	●

=== Suseo–Mokpo ===
Station	Distance (from Suseo)		Stopping
Station	km	mi	Stopping
Suseo	0.0	0.0	●
Dongtan	32.6	20.2	○
PyeongtaekJije	53.6	33.3	△
Cheonan–Asan	78.7	48.9	○
Osong	107.3	66.6	○
Gongju	151.1	93.8	△
Iksan	197.1	122.4	●
Jeongeup	239.2	148.6	△
GwangjuSongjeong	289.7	189.0	●
Naju	305.5	189.8	△
Mokpo	356.5	221.5	△

== Rolling stock ==
=== KTX-Sancheon ===
The train service was operated using 22 KTX-Sancheon Class 120000 train sets and 10 KTX-Sancheon Class 130000 train sets. Class 120000 train sets was originally operated by Korail's KTX service before it was transferred to SR at the end of 2016, while Class 130000 train sets are new builds.

== Extension beyond HSRs ==
Since Super Rapid Train only had two routes, there are many local cities that only KTX serves. In November 2016, Jeonju and Yeosu urged the SR Corporation to run trains on the Jeolla Line. In December 2016, the mayor of Pohang proposed running SRT service to Pohang station using the Donghae Line. In January 2021, the mayor of Changwon urged the SR Corporation to run SRT service to Changwon station using the Gyeongjeon Line.

On September 1, 2023, SRT services using Jeolla Line, Donghae Line and Gyeongjeon Line were launched.

== See also ==
- KTX
- High-speed rail in South Korea
- Rail transport in South Korea
- Transport in South Korea
