= High-speed rail in South Korea =

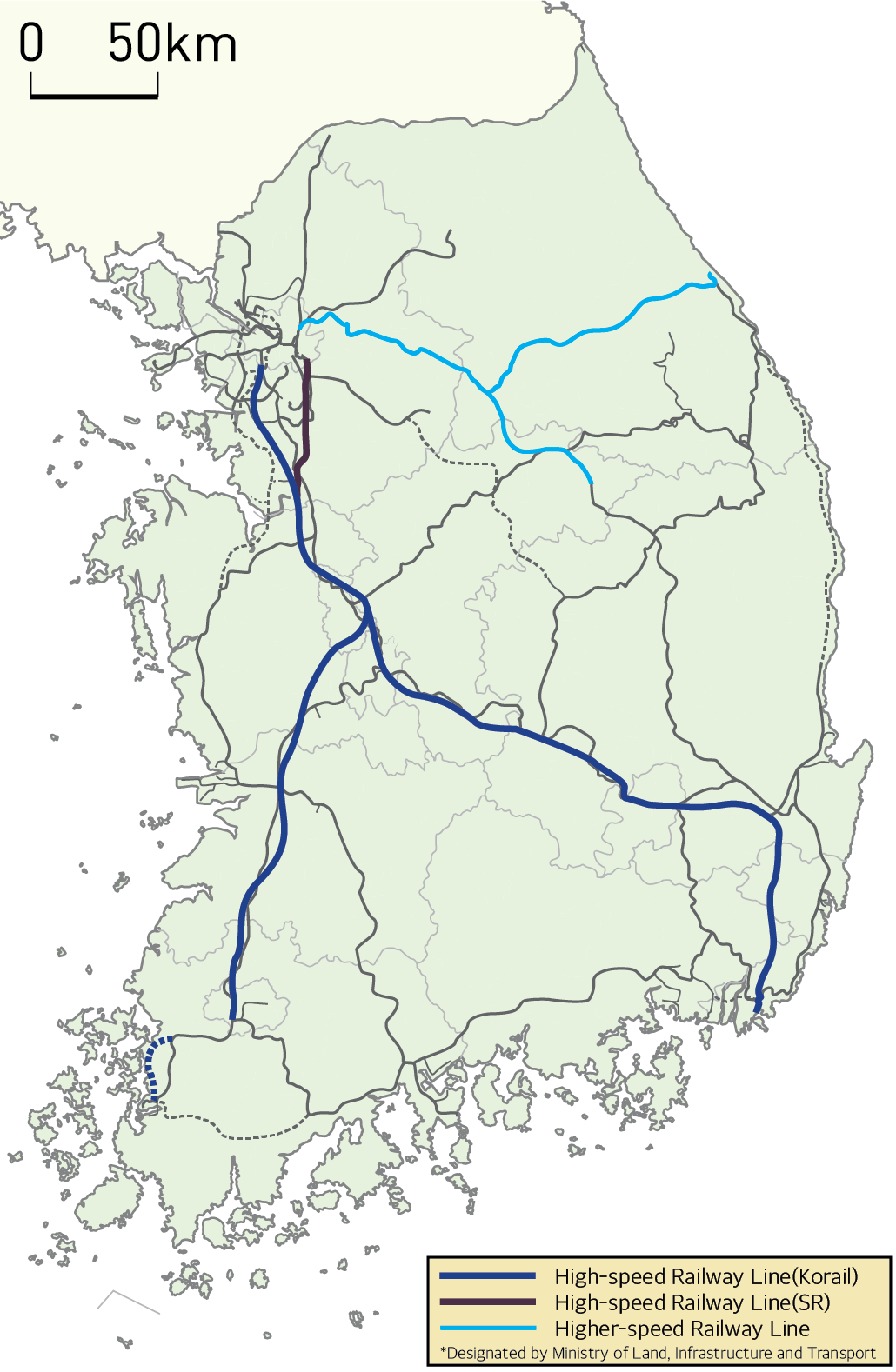
High-speed railway lines in South Korea

High-speed rail service in South Korea began with the construction of a high-speed line from Seoul to Busan in 1992. The first commercial high-speed rail service was launched on 1 April 2004. Currently, South Korea hosts two high-speed rail operators: Korea Train eXpress (better known as KTX) and Super Rapid Train (better known as SRT), using different terminals in Seoul to provide service.

Note that Great Train eXpress (GTX) and other higher-speed urban rail services in South Korea have max speed below 200 km/h and are not usually considered high-speed rail.

== Types of railways ==
The Railway Service Act is the primary Korean law that codifies and defines the three types of railway lines. It states that the Ministry of Land, Infrastructure and Transport should designate track lines and announce them before their commercial operation.

There are three types of railway lines:

- High-speed railway lines (Korean: 고속철도노선) can run at speeds of 300 km/h (186 mph) or more on the majority of tracks.
  - Gyeongbu HSR Line
  - Honam HSR Line
  - Suseo-Pyeongtaek HSR Line
- Semi-high-speed railway lines (Korean: 준고속철도노선) can run at speeds between 200 km/h (124 mph) to 300 km/h (186 mph) on the majority of tracks. Although the name of category indicates lower maximum speed, these lines can be still recognized as high-speed rail by international standards. This term can describe both new-built and upgraded lines.
  - Gyeonggang Line (Wonju–Gangneung)
  - Jungang Line (Cheongnyangni–Dodam)
- Conventional Lines (Korean: 일반철도노선) can run at a maximum speed of less than 200 km/h (124 mph) on the majority of tracks.

Gyeongbu HSR Line	Honam HSR Line	Suseo-Pyeongtaek HSR Line

== Types of trains ==
The Railway Service Act and its enforcement bodies categorize high-speed trains into three types as mentioned below.

- High-speed railway trains (고속철도차량) that have a maximum speed of 300 km/h (186 mph) or more.
  - KTX-I
  - KTX-Sancheon
  - KTX-Cheongryong
- Semi-high-speed railway trains (준고속철도차량) that have a maximum speed between 200 km/h (124 mph) to 300 km/h (186 mph).
  - KTX-Eum
- Conventional Trains (일반철도차량) that have a maximum speed of less than 200 km/h (124 mph).

== Lines in service ==
Lines generally start in Seoul and end in either the southwest or southeast area of the country. Seoul has three main KTX stations (Seoul Station, Yongsan Station, and Cheongnyangni Station). Seoul Station is mainly for the Gyeongbu and Gyeongjeon lines; Yongsan Station is mainly for the Honam and Jeolla lines; and Cheongnyangni Station for the Gangneung line. Additionally, Suseo station in southeast Seoul serves the SRT.

Only a few KTX trains use conventional lines to serve select stations such as Suwon, Gupo, and Nonsan. These trains are slower but more cost-efficient.

- Gyeongbu KTX: Seoul - Daejeon - Daegu (Dongdaegu) - Busan/Pohang.
- Honam KTX: Seoul (Yongsan) - Gongju - Iksan - Mokpo/Gwangju
- Gyeongjeon KTX: Seoul - Daejeon - Daegu (Dongdaegu) - Miryang - Changwon - Jinju
- Jeolla KTX: Seoul (Yongsan) - Gongju - Iksan - Jeonju - Suncheon - Yeosu
- Gangneung KTX: Seoul (mainly to Cheongnyangni station, however, some trains continue to Seoul station) - Wonju (Manjong) - Pyeongchang - Gangneung/Donghae.
- SRT: Seoul (Suseo) - Dongtan - Jije - (continues along the same alignment as the Gyeongbu/Honam KTX line after Cheonan)

Some KTX trains proceed north from Seoul to Haengshin.

== Services ==
KTX and SRT network map in 2024

=== By operators ===
==== KTX ====
KTX is the first high-speed rail service in South Korea, and is operated by Korail. When compared to KTX-I, the KTX-Sancheon trains have improved seats and power plugs for each seat, and have more power plugs between the windows. There is no extra fare to ride on the KTX-Sancheon.

Most KTX trains leave from Seoul Station or Yongsan Station and terminate in the cities of Busan, Gwangju, Mokpo, Yeosu, Gangneung and Jinju. Most major cities are served in between.

The KTX train is regarded as an easier, more comfortable, and cheaper way to get around South Korea than by air, particularly when factoring in the complications of security and getting to/from the airport. Ticket prices are slightly below the equivalent fare of the major airlines. The weekday Standard Class price from Seoul to Busan is around ₩57,000.

There are three types of KTX seat classes: First, Superior, and Standard. First-class has wider seats, free snacks, and bottled water. There are only First and Standard seats in KTX-I and KTX-Sancheon and there are only Superior and Standard seats in KTX-Eum.

The KTX service only runs domestically, although many hope that one day it could run through North Korea and onto the rest of Asia. Plans by South Korea and China to connect their networks through North Korea are unlikely to ever be fulfilled because of the North Korea's political rivalry with South Korea.

==== SRT ====
The SRT starts at Suseo station, located in southeastern Seoul, and is operated by SR. The line serves the same route as Gyeongbu and Honam KTX after Cheonanasan. It uses a separate booking system and app despite using the same trains. Offline tickets can be purchased from the Korail counters, similar to the regular KTX. It is slightly cheaper and more convenient to go to the district of Gangnam in Seoul. Most of the services by Korail such as the Korail pass will not be applied and there are fewer scheduled trains as well.

=== By region ===
- Gyeongbu high-speed railway: High-speed rail service that connects Seoul and Busan by KTX or SRT.
- Honam high-speed railway: High-speed rail service that connects Seoul and Gwangju (Mokpo) by KTX or SRT. Note that this terminology was used as the project name for constructing the Honam High-speed railway line that connects Osong and Gwangju.

== Future rail lines ==
High-speed railway lines under construction	Planned high-speed railway lines

== See also ==
- Rail transport in South Korea
