= Dongtan, Hwaseong =

Township in Gyeonggi, South Korea

Coordinates: 37.218°N 127.112°E

New Dongtan City
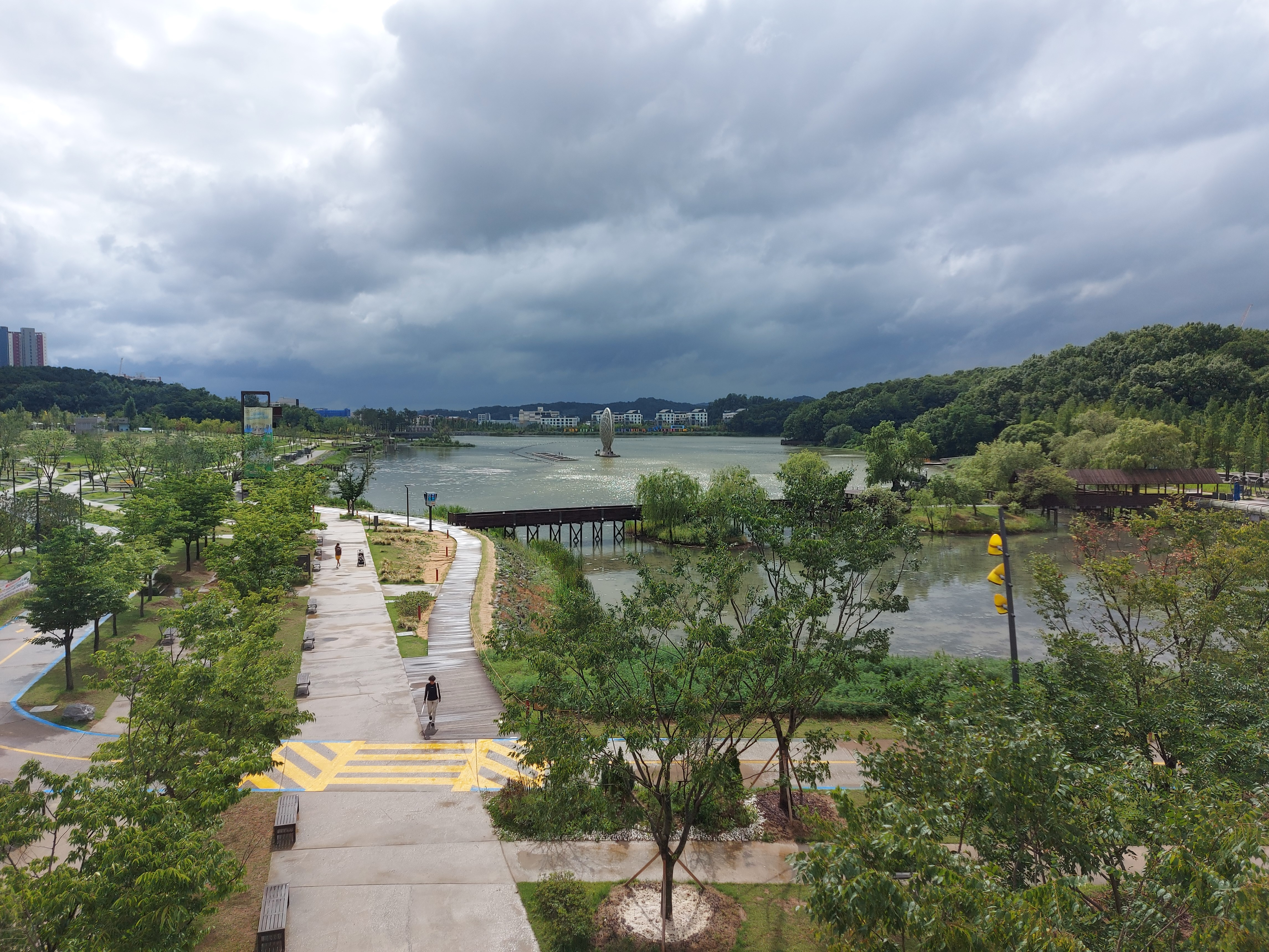
- Dongtan Lake Park
- Interactive map of New Dongtan City
- Country: South Korea
- Province: Gyeonggi
- City: Hwaseong
- Time zone: UTC+9 (South Korea Time)

Korean name
- Hangul: 동탄신도시
- Hanja: 東灘新都市
- RR: Dongtan sindosi
- MR: Tongt'an sindosi

Dongtan (Korean: 동탄) is a township in Hwaseong, Gyeonggi, South Korea, with many shops and restaurants. It includes four residential skyscrapers of 70–80 floors, collectively called "Metapolis", which also contains a shopping mall. The Suseo–Pyeongtaek high-speed railway, which runs from Suseo station to Jije station, passes through Dongtan.

Dongtan Station is the southern terminus of the first line of the GTX higher-speed train.

The population of Dongtan was 406,036 in 2024.

Housing prices in the township have increased substantially due to skyrocketing profits from the semiconductor industry.
