= Yulhyeon Tunnel =

Railway tunnel between Seoul and Gyeonggi Provinces in South Korea

- Hangul: 율현터널
- Hanja: 栗峴터널
- RR: Yulhyeon teoneol
- MR: Yurhyŏn t'ŏnŏl

The Yulhyeon Tunnel (Korean: 율현터널) is a railway tunnel in South Korea, which opened in 9 December 2016, and is currently the world's fourth longest railway tunnel at 50.3 kilometres (31.3 mi). The tunnel, which consists of a double-track tube, is part of the 61.1-kilometre (38.0 mi) Suseo–Pyeongtaek high-speed railway and GTX-A that connects Suseo station in the southeastern part of Seoul with the Gyeongbu high-speed railway. The threading into the older high-speed line is in the south of the city of Pyeongtaek. The tunnel itself takes up about 82% of the total new line. The Yulhyeon Tunnel was built using the New Austrian tunnelling method (NATM) and is designed for a maximum speed of 300 km/h (186 mph). The average cruising speed is about 240 km/h (149 mph) due to the intermediate stop at Dongtan Station in the southern part of the tunnel.

== Structural issues ==
The major section of Yulhyeon Tunnel has been built over the seismic fault called Singal Fault, which triggered an inquest into its structural stability. Korea Rail Network Authority argued that "the diversion of the line outside of the fault zone was impossible since all those corresponding regions around the line were within the zone".

On the 14th of April, 2021 an audit performed by Board of Audit and Inspection revealed structural and design flaws that have been present virtually since the opening of the tunnel. The audit argued that several factors, including negligent geological surveying and unauthorized construction methods caused the trackbed to deform, rendering the track structure uneven which ultimately resulted in excess vibration in the trains, reducing the highest operational speed from 240 km/h to as low as 90 km/h in certain sections. In the wake of these flaws the Korea Rail Network Authority were ordered to prepare a comprehensive reinforcement plan.
