= Dongtan station (disambiguation) =

Dongtan station is a train station in Hwaseong City, Gyeonggi Province, South Korea.

Dongtan station may also refer to:

- Dongtan station (Shanghai Metro), future metro station on Chongming line, in Dongtan, Chongming District, Shanghai, China
- Dongtan station (Xi'an Skyshuttle), people mover station on Xi'an Skyshuttle in operation, in Xi'an, Shaanxi, China
