= Park Ji-sung Road =

Road in Gyeonggi Province, South Korea

Park Ji-sung Road or Dongtanjiseong-ro (동탄지성로) is a road located between Suwon and Hwaseong in Gyeonggi-do, South Korea. Park Ji-sung Road is a six-lane road that runs from the front of Bethlehem Church in Hwaseong, Gyeonggi Province to Yeongtong-dong Road in Yeongtong-dong, Suwon. The road is named after Park Ji-sung, and it was created after the 2002 World Cup match against Portugal when he scored the decisive goal for Park's advance to the round of 16 and was promised by Gyeonggi Province Governor Sohn Hak-kyu, who visited Park's house in Suwon. It was opened in 2005, attended by Park. In 2009 the road was renamed Dongtanjiseong-ro, with the name of Dongtan New Town added to the name of the road.

On the 86 meter-long soundproof walls that are installed in front of the Sericulture and Insect Research Institute in the middle of the road, 10 large photos of Park's World Cup matches and goals are displayed. Park Ji-sung Forest, a 297.5 m^{2} forest, was also created near the National Seed Management Center next to the road.

== Park ji-sung Football Center ==
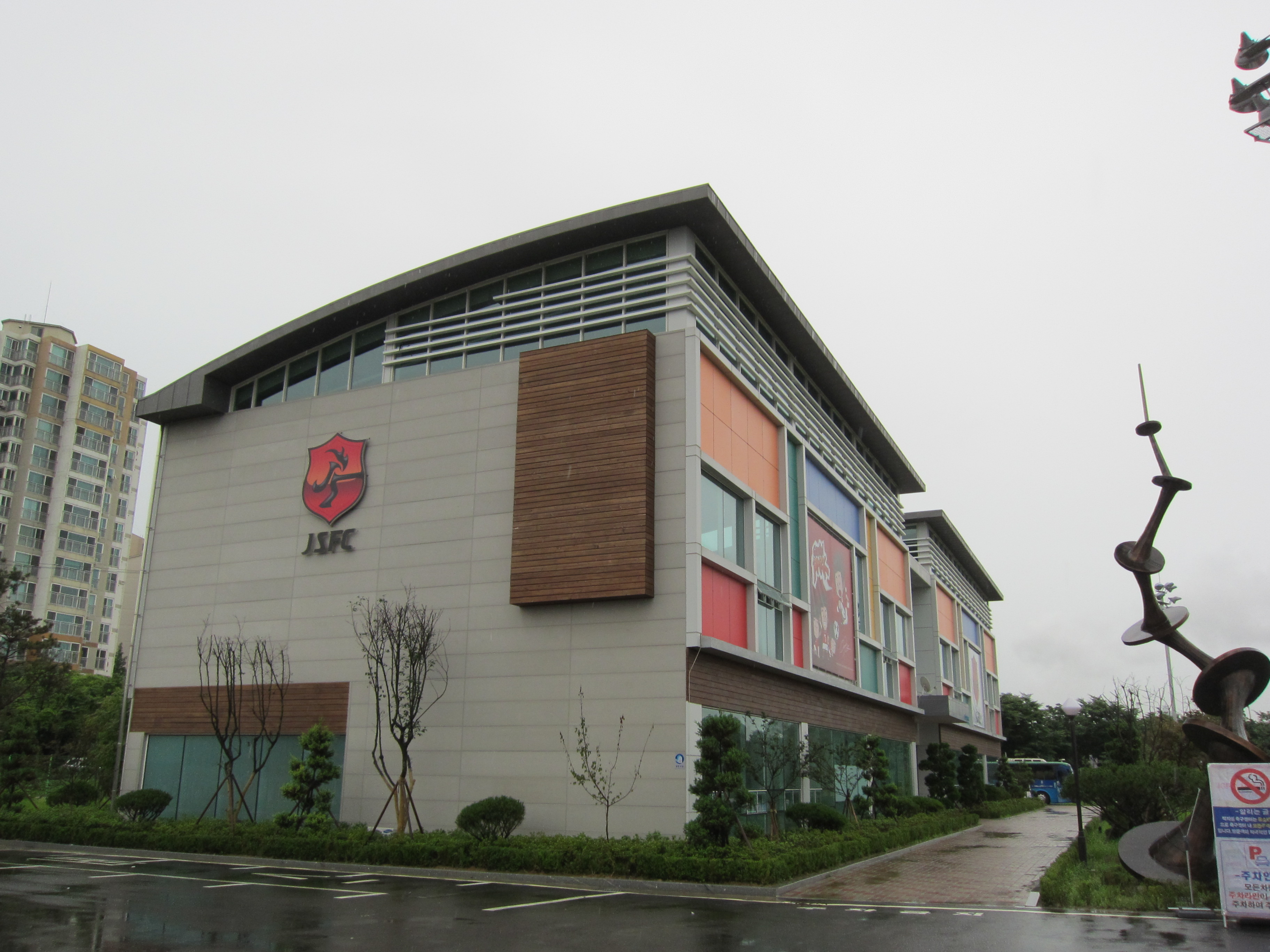
Ji-sung Football center

Park ji-sung Football center is located right next to Park Ji-sung Road. To get to Park Ji-sung Football Center, one can only go via Park Ji-sung Road. The Park Ji-sung Soccer Center (Ji-Sung Football Center, JSFC) is a football center that enables Korean soccer player Park Ji-sung to foster growth and development of youth soccer training facilities in the Republic of Korea, and to utilize his training facilities for training in various sports. The construction began on October 6, 2009, with a groundbreaking ceremony for the seed management office site of the Korea Agricultural Technology Institute in Gyeonggi Province, 10,5658 square meters 2, and held a completion ceremony on July 24, 2010.

== Maintenance issue ==
Ten years after the opening of Park Ji-Sung Road, the road became neglected due to the lack of management and indifference of the local governments. In 2009, a section of road (3.4 km) in Hwaseong City was included in a reorganisation and the name of the road was changed to Dongtanjiseong-ro, and the management responsibility for the road between different local governments became unclear. As a result, maintenance work was not done on time, and the management of roads and facilities is left in a state of disarray. The road signboard placed at the entrance to the Shin-dong trunk road in Suwon was left untouched for months after the explanatory text was damaged.
