= Great Train eXpress =

South Korean higher-speed rail system

Great Train eXpress (GTX) is a higher-speed commuter rail network in the Seoul Metropolitan Area project consisting of three separate lines, named GTX-A, GTX-B and GTX-C, and scheduled for completion in 2030. Three other lines, named GTX-D, GTX-E and GTX-F are being planned.

== GTX-A ==
GTX-A
- Great Train eXpress
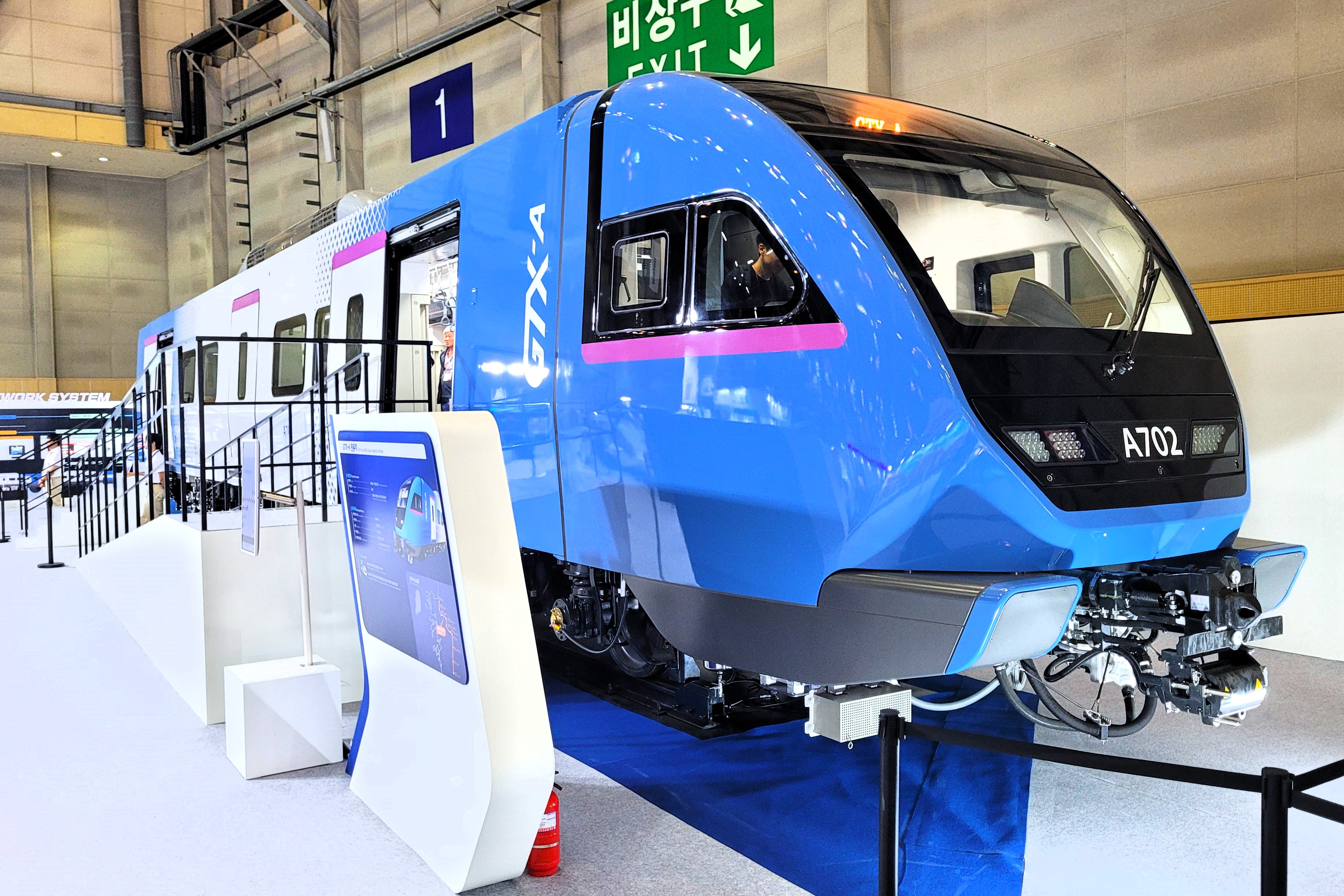
- A GTX-A A000 series EMU

Overview
- Native name: 수도권 광역급행철도 A노선
- Owner: Government of South Korea
- Locale: Seoul
- Termini: Unjeongjungang; Suseo; Seoul; Dongtan
- Stations: 9
- Color on map: Lilac

Service
- Type: Commuter rail
- Services: 2
- Operator(s): Great Train eXpress A-Line Operation Co., Ltd.

History
- Opened: 30 March 2024; 2 years ago

Technical
- Num of tracks: 2
- Character: Underground
- Track gauge: 1,435 mm (4 ft 8 1/2 in)
- Electrification: 25 kV/60 Hz
- Operating speed: 180 km/h (110 mph)

The GTX-A, officially Metropolitan Area Rapid Transit Line A, is a higher-speed commuter railway line operating in two sections in Seoul, South Korea.

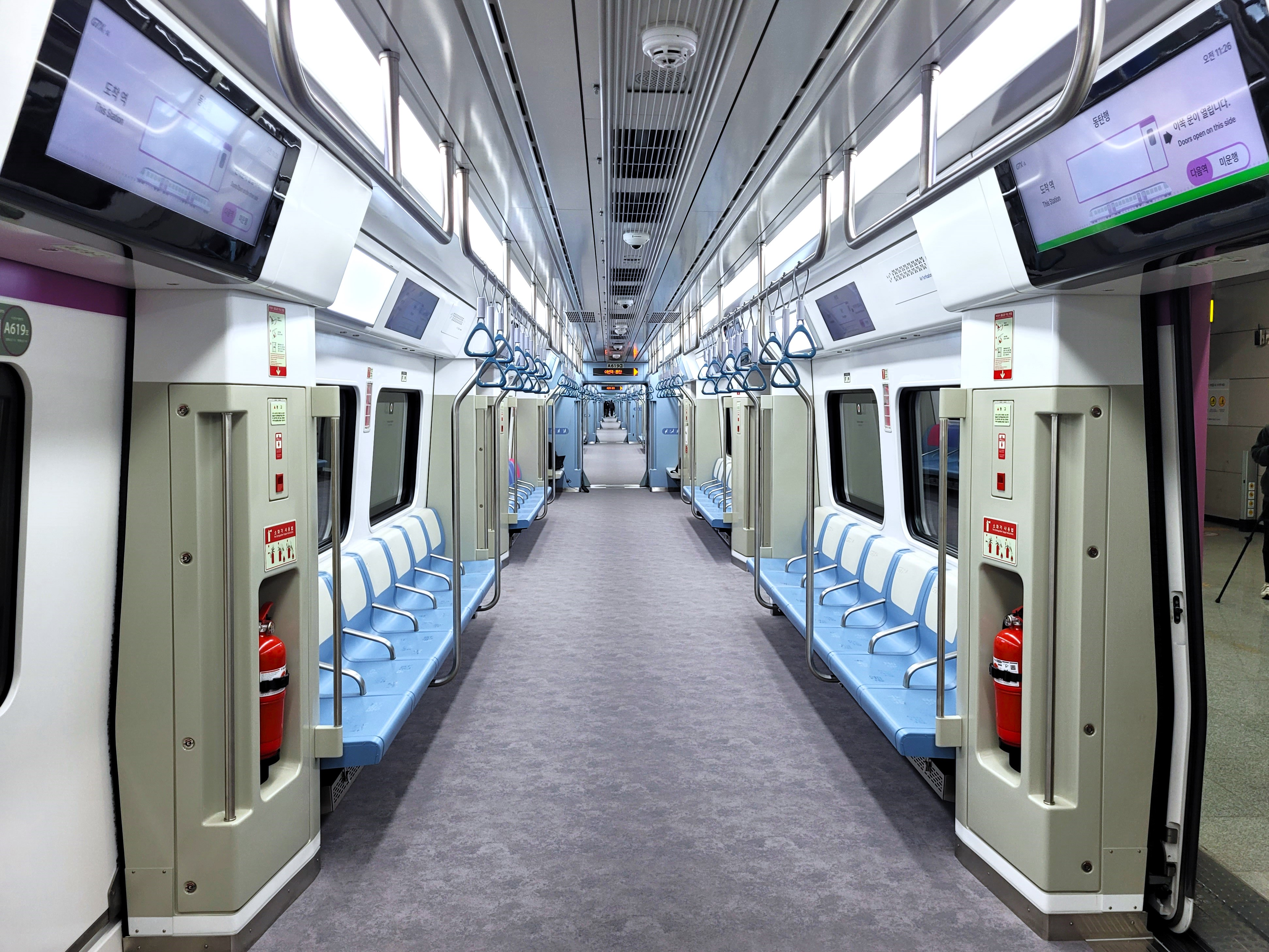
Interior of a GTX-A train

Groundbreaking for GTX Line A was held on December 27, 2018, with service initially expected to commence in 2023. However, the project has been officially delayed due to land compensation issues and the discovery of archaeological ruins dating from the Joseon period.

The line currently runs in two separate sections - Dongtan to Suseo and Unjeongjungang to Seoul Station. Suseo, Seongnam, and Dongtan stations were opened on March 30, 2024, with Guseong Station opening later on June 29, 2024. The section between Unjeongjungang and Seoul Station opened on December 28, 2024.

=== Operation ===
Approximately 30 km (19 mi) of the line are expected to share the same rail as the SRT, and an additional 9 km (5.6 mi) towards the western end of the route are expected to be completely underground. Trains operate at around three to four services per hour in each direction in the southern section with anywhere between 15 and 30 minutes between services. Meanwhile, the northern section operates at six services per hour per direction with ten minutes between services.

Each GTX-A train has a capacity of 1,090 passengers.

=== Future plans ===
The connection between Seoul Station and Suseo is anticipated to open in August 2026. However, in May 2026, it had been discovered that a number of support columns at the fifth basement level at Samseong Station had been constructed inadequately, making the targeted August 2026 opening unlikely.

In addition, Samseong Station has been further delayed, and, as of May 2026, is not scheduled to open until October 2028.

Furthermore, a southern extension of the line from Dongtan to PyeongtaekJije Station had been in the planning stage for approximately one month before the opening of the line's opening.

=== Current Routes ===
- Seoul Station — Unjeongjungang
- Suseo — Dongtan

=== Stations ===
Station Number	Station name		Transfer	Line name	Distance (km)	Total distance (km)	Location		Date Opened
Station Number	English	Hangul	Transfer	Line name	Distance (km)	Total distance (km)	Location		Date Opened
X101	Unjeongjungang	운정중앙		GTX-A	—	0.0	Gyeonggi Province	Paju	28 December 2024
X102	Kintex	킨텍스		GTX-A	6.7	6.7	Gyeonggi Province	Goyang	28 December 2024
X103	Daegok	대곡	Gyeongui–Jungang Line Seohae Line	GTX-A	6.9	13.6	Gyeonggi Province	Goyang	28 December 2024
X104	Changneung	창릉		GTX-A	6.2	19.8	Gyeonggi Province	Goyang	2030
X105	Yeonsinnae	연신내	Seoul Subway Line 3 Seoul Subway Line 6	GTX-A	3.7 (9.9)	23.5	Seoul	Eunpyeong	28 December 2024
X106	Seoul Station	서울역	Gyeongui–Jungang Line Korail KTX	GTX-A	9.5	33.0	Seoul	Jung	28 December 2024
X107	Samseong (Note: Bongeunsa station will be merged with Samseong Station.)	삼성	Seoul Subway Line 2	GTX-A	10.1	43.1	Seoul	Gangnam	April 2028
X108	Suseo	수서	Suin–Bundang Line	GTX-A	5.2 (15.3)	48.3	Seoul	Gangnam	30 March 2024
X109	Seongnam	성남	Gyeonggang Line	Suseo–Pyeongtaek HSR (shared)	10.7	59.0	Gyeonggi Province	Seongnam	30 March 2024
X110	Guseong	구성	Suin–Bundang Line	Suseo–Pyeongtaek HSR (shared)	11.0	70.0	Gyeonggi Province	Yongin	29 June 2024
X111	Dongtan	동탄	KTX	Suseo–Pyeongtaek HSR (shared)	11.1	81.1	Gyeonggi Province	Hwaseong	30 March 2024

== GTX-B ==
Construction of GTX Line B commenced on March 7, 2024. It is planned to be completed by 2030.

Station number	Station name		Transfer	Line name	Distance	Total distance	Location	
Station number	English	Hangul	Transfer	Line name	Distance	Total distance	Location	
TBA	Songdo (Note: Not to be confused with Songdo station on the Suin-Bundang Line. This station will be located in Songdo International City and offer transfer to Incheon National University station.)	송도	Incheon Subway Line 1	GTX-B	—	0.0	Incheon	Yeonsu
TBA	Incheon City Hall	인천시청	Incheon Subway Line 1 Incheon Subway Line 2	GTX-B	—	—	Incheon	Namdong
TBA	Bupyeong	부평	Seoul Subway Line 1	GTX-B	—	—	Incheon	Bupyeong
TBA	Bucheon Stadium	부천종합운동장	Seohae Line	GTX-B	—	—	Gyeonggi	Bucheon
TBA	Sindorim	신도림	Seoul Subway Line 1 Seoul Subway Line 2	GTX-B	—	—	Seoul	Guro
TBA	Yeouido	여의도	Seoul Subway Line 5 Seoul Subway Line 9	GTX-B	—	—	Seoul	Yeongdeungdo
TBA	Yongsan	용산	Gyeongui–Jungang Line Korail KTX	GTX-B	—	—	Seoul	Yongsan
TBA	Seoul Station	서울역	Gyeongui–Jungang Line Korail KTX	GTX-B	—	—	Seoul	Jung
TBA	Cheongnyangni	청량리	Gyeongui–Jungang Line Suin–Bundang Line Korail KTX	GTX-B	—	—	Seoul	Dongdaemun
TBA	Sangbong (Note: Sangbong station will be merged with Mangu station.)	상봉	Gyeongui–Jungang Line Gyeongchun Line	GTX-B	—	—	Seoul	Jungnang
TBA	Byeollae	별내	Gyeongchun Line	Gyeongchun Line (shared)	—	—	Gyeonggi	Namyangju
TBA	PyeongnaeHopyeong	평내호평	Gyeongchun Line	Gyeongchun Line (shared)	—	—	Gyeonggi	Namyangju
TBA	Maseok	마석	Gyeongchun Line	Gyeongchun Line (shared)	—	—	Gyeonggi	Namyangju

== GTX-C ==
Construction of GTX Line C commenced on January 25, 2024. It is planned to be completed by 2028. According to the latest plans and following the selection of a preferred bidder for the construction of this line, two additional stations, Indeogwon Station and Wangsimni Station are likely to be added to the line. An additional southern extension past Suwon to Cheonan-Asan is also in consideration.

Station number	Station name		Transfer	Line name	Distance	Total distance	Location	
Station number	English	Hangul	Transfer	Line name	Distance	Total distance	Location	
TBA	Suwon	수원	Suin–Bundang Line KTX	Gyeongbu Line (shared); Gwacheon Line (shared)	—	0.0	Gyeonggi	Suwon
TBA	Geumjeong	금정	Seoul Subway Line 1 Seoul Subway Line 4	Gyeongbu Line (shared); Gwacheon Line (shared)	—	—	Gyeonggi	Gunpo
TBA	Gwacheon (Note: This station is just named Gwacheon station, but located at Government Complex Gwacheon station.)	과천	Seoul Subway Line 4	GTX-C	—	—	Gyeonggi	Gwacheon
TBA	Yangjae	양재	Shinbundang Line	GTX-C	—	—	Seoul	Gangnam
TBA	Samseong	삼성	Seoul Subway Line 2 Seoul Subway Line 9	GTX-C	—	—	Seoul	Gangnam
TBA	Cheongnyangni	청량리	Gyeongui–Jungang Line Suin–Bundang Line Korail KTX	GTX-C	—	—	Seoul	Dongdaemun
TBA	Kwangwoon University	광운대	Gyeongchun Line	GTX-C	—	—	Seoul	Nowon
TBA	Chang-dong	창동	Seoul Subway Line 1 Seoul Subway Line 4	GTX-C	—	—	Seoul	Dobong
TBA	Uijeongbu	의정부	Seoul Subway Line 1	Gyeongwon Line (shared)	—	—	Gyeonggi	Uijeongbu
TBA	Deokjeong	덕정	Seoul Subway Line 1	Gyeongwon Line (shared)	—	—	Gyeonggi	Yangju

== Additional plans for other lines ==
Plans for a Line D were announced in 2021 by the previous government. However, the proposed route faced a lot of opposition, and has not been approved yet. The new government of Yoon Suk-yeol has pledged to build three new lines (Lines D, E and F), for which the routes have not been decided yet, but which would likely include plans for a longer Line D than the one announced by the previous government. Plans for a Line G and H that will expand to the northern and southwestern regions of Gyeonggi Province have also been announced.

Station number	Station name		Transfer	Line name	Distance	Total distance	Location	
Station number	English	Hangul	Transfer	Line name	Distance	Total distance	Location	
TBA	Janggi	장기	Gimpo Goldline	GTX-D	—	0.0	Gyeonggi	Gimpo
TBA	Geomdan	검단		GTX-D		—	Incheon	Seo
TBA	Gyeyang	계양	Incheon Subway Line 1	GTX-D	—	—	Incheon	Gyeyang
TBA	Daejang	대장		GTX-D	—	—	Gyeonggi	Bucheon
TBA	Dangarae	당아래	Seoul Subway Line 7	GTX-D	—	—	Gyeonggi	Bucheon

== Criticism ==
Critics argue that the GTX project would further concentrate social and economic power towards Seoul, leading to increased primacy and the collapse of other provincial cities.
