= Cheonan–Asan station =

Train station in Asan, South Korea

천안아산 (온양온천)
Cheonan–Asan
(Onyangoncheon)
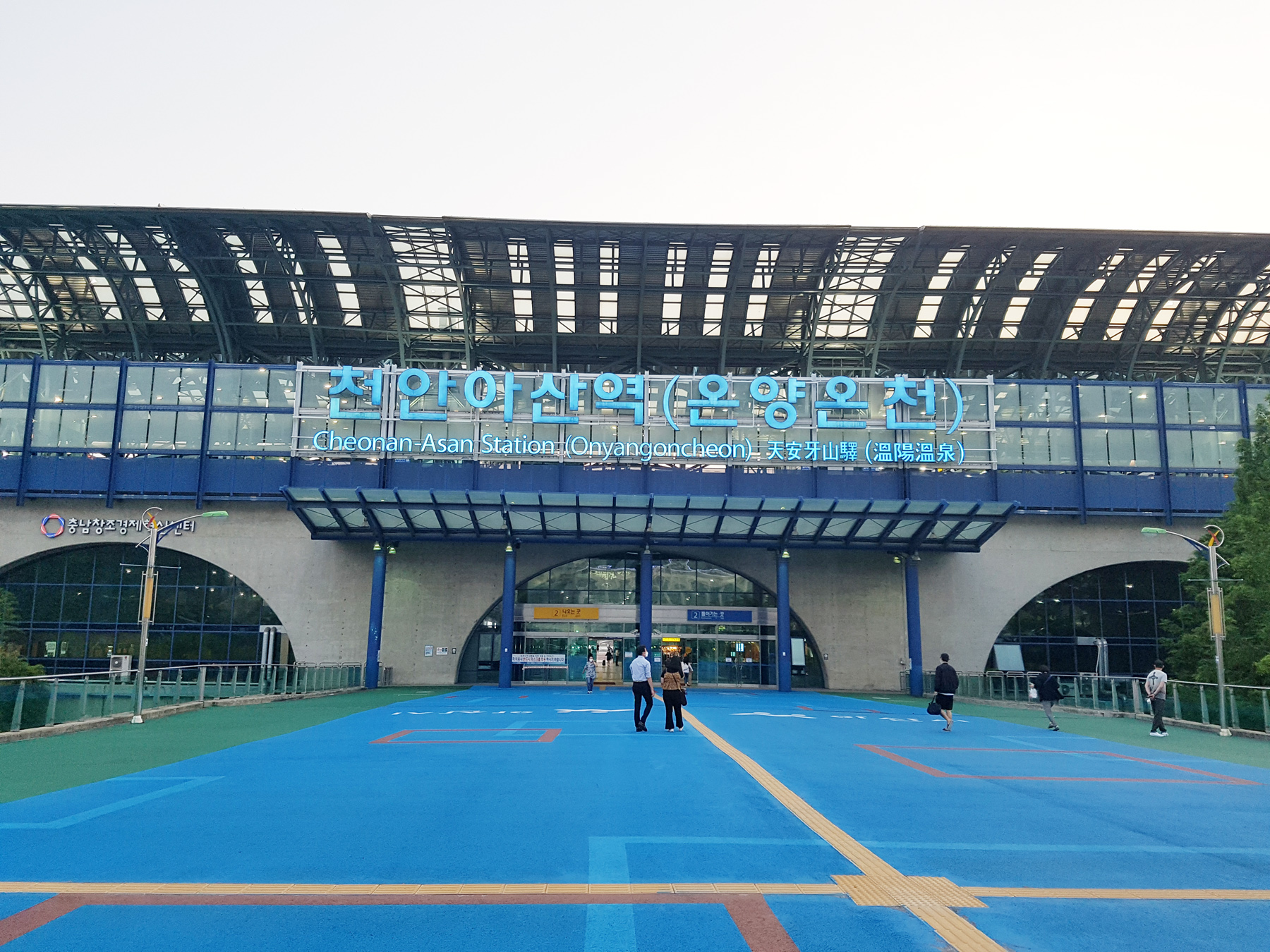

Korean name
- Hangul: 천안아산역
- Hanja: 天安牙山驛
- Revised Romanization: Cheonanasannyeok
- McCune–Reischauer: Ch'ŏnanasannyŏk

General information
- Location: 100 Huimang-ro, Baebang-eup, Asan-si, Chungcheongnam-do; South Korea
- Coordinates: 36°47′39.78″N 127°6′16.28″E
- Operator: Korail
- Line: Gyeongbu high-speed railway
- Platforms: 2
- Tracks: 4
- Connections: Asan station

Construction
- Structure type: Aboveground

History
- Opened: March 27, 2003

Passengers
- (Daily) Based on Jan-Dec of 2012. KTX: 14,556

Services
Preceding station	Korea Train Express	Following station
Gwangmyeong towards Haengsin or Seoul	Gyeongbu KTX	Osong towards Busan
PyeongtaekJije towards Suseo	Gyeongbu KTX	Osong towards Busan
Gwangmyeong towards Haengsin	Gyeongjeon KTX	Osong towards Jinju
PyeongtaekJije towards Suseo	Gyeongjeon KTX	Osong towards Jinju
Gwangmyeong towards Haengsin	Donghae KTX	Osong towards Pohang
PyeongtaekJije towards Suseo	Donghae KTX	Osong towards Pohang
Gwangmyeong towards Haengsin	Honam KTX	Osong towards Mokpo
PyeongtaekJije towards Suseo	Honam KTX	Osong towards Mokpo
Gwangmyeong towards Haengsin or Yongsan	Jeolla KTX	Osong towards Yeosu-Expo
PyeongtaekJije towards Suseo	Jeolla KTX	Osong towards Yeosu-Expo
Location

Cheonan–Asan station (Korean: 천안아산역) is a ground-level train station located mostly in Asan, South Chungcheong Province, South Korea, although part of it lies in the neighboring city of Cheonan. This station serves high-speed KTX trains that run from Seoul to either Busan or Mokpo. It is connected to (and it is possible to transfer to trains which stop at) Asan station, a railway station on the Janghang Line which is also served by Line 1 of the Seoul Subway.

== History ==
The location of Cheonan–Asan was finalised on June 14, 1993, though construction did not begin until July 22, 1996. The planned name of "Onyangoncheon" was changed to "Cheonan–Asan" on November 20, 2003, and the station building was completed on March 27 the following year. The station opened for business four days later, on April 1, 2004.

On March 30, 2007, Asan station was opened as a transfer station on the Janghang Line, soon to be integrated into the latest extension of Line 1 of the Seoul Subway.

== Services ==
Cheonan–Asan station serves select KTX trains on the Gyeongbu High Speed Railway and Honam High Speed Railway lines. (KTX services calling at Suwon do not pass through Cheonan–Asan, and not all KTX trains that do pass through will stop at this station).

== Station layout ==
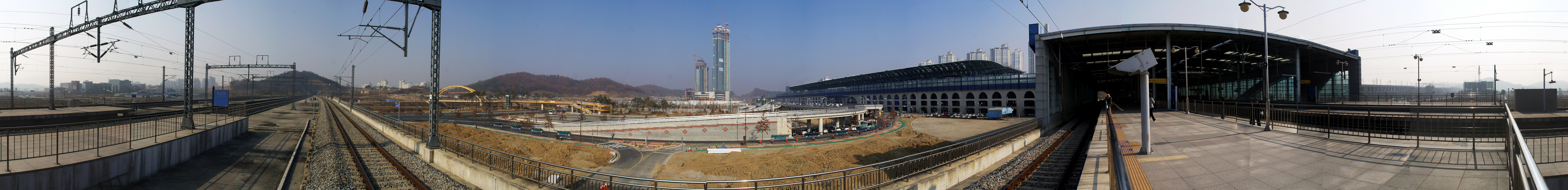
Cheonan–Asan station seen in a 360° panorama taken from Asan station's platform

L2; Platforms	Side platform, doors will open on the left
L2; Platforms	Platform 4	KTX Gyeongbu line toward Busan (Osong) →
L2; Platforms	Island platform, doors will open on the left, right
L2; Platforms	Platform 3	KTX Gyeongbu Line toward Busan (Osong) →
L2; Platforms	Through tracks	KTX Gyeongbu Line does not stop here →
L2; Platforms	Through tracks	← KTX Gyeongbu Line does not stop here
L2; Platforms	Platform 2	← KTX Gyeongbu Line toward Seoul or Haengsin (Gwangmyeong)
L2; Platforms	Island platform, doors will open on the left, right
L2; Platforms	Platform 1	← KTX Gyeongbu Line toward Seoul or Haengsin (Gwangmyeong)
L2; Platforms	Side platform, doors will open on the left

L1; Concourse	Lobby	Customer service, shops, vending machines, ATMs

G	Street level	Exit

== Gallery ==
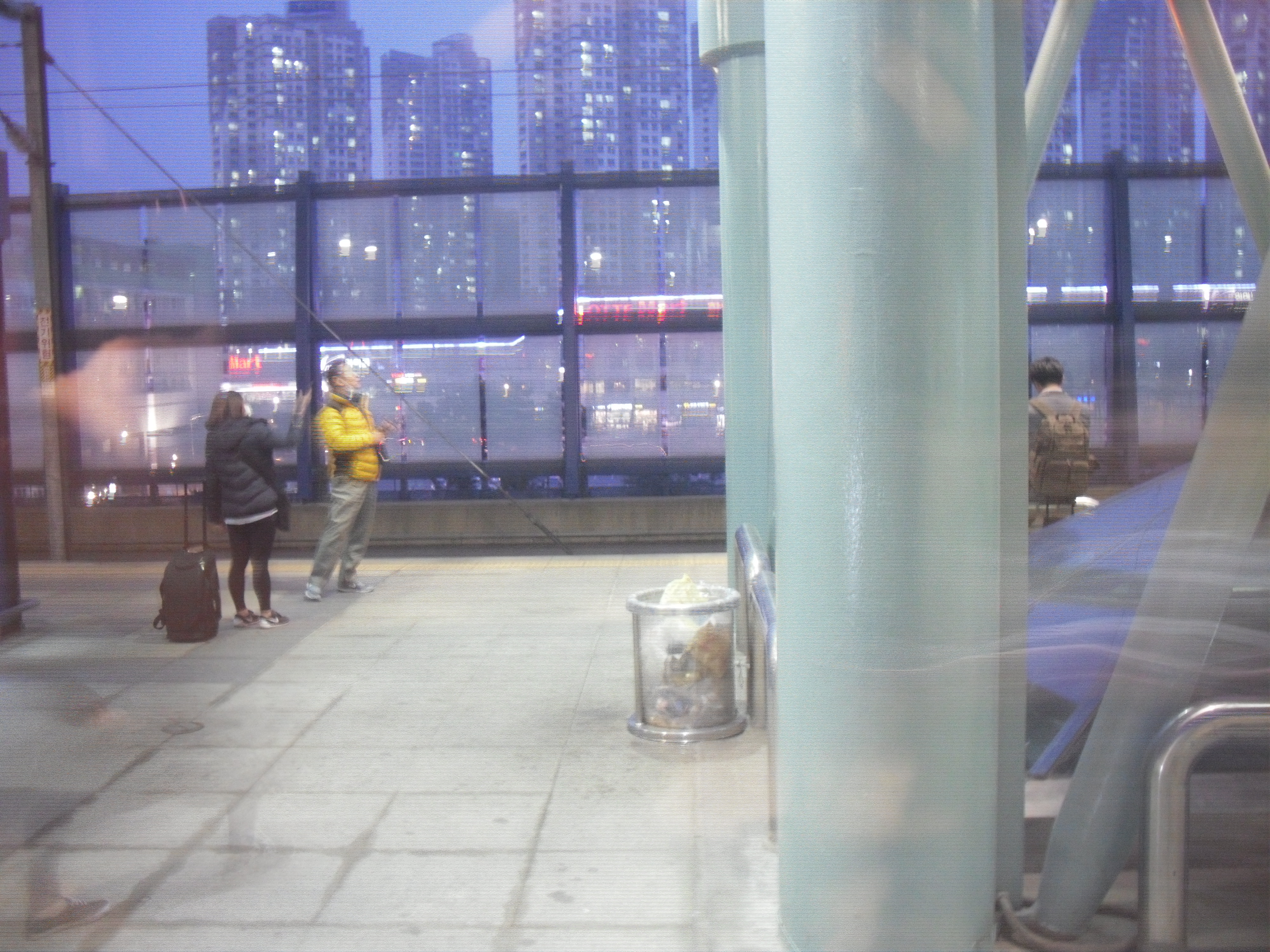
The platform for Busan station taken in SRT

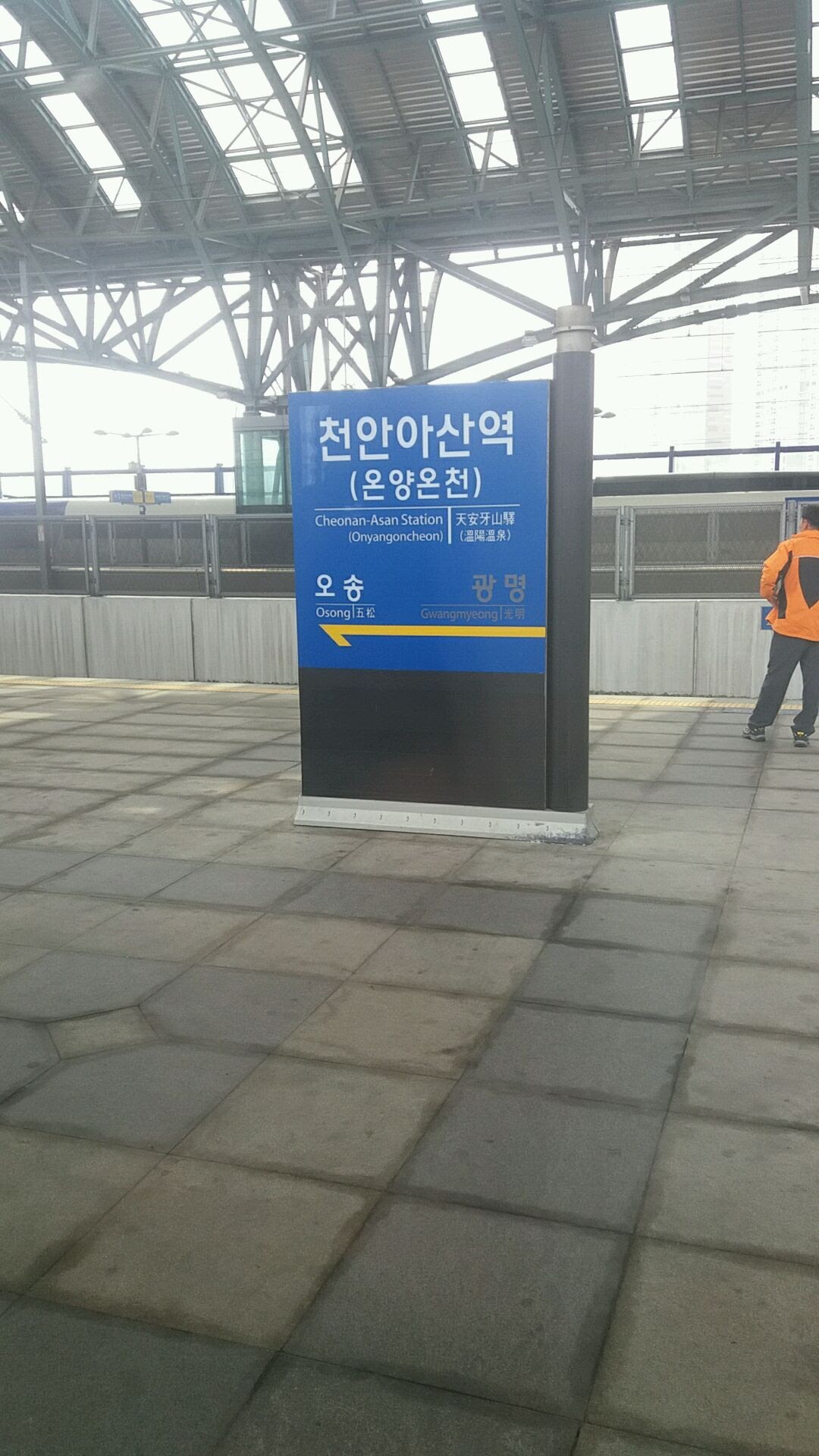
Cheonan–Asan station sign

== See also ==
- Transportation in South Korea
- Korail
- KTX
