= PyeongtaekJije station =

Train stop in South Korea

Coordinates: 37°01′08″N 127°04′13″E

평택지제
PyeongtaekJije
평택지제 (한경국립대); PyeongtaekJije (Hankyung Nat'l Univ.)

Korean name
- Hangul: 평택지제역
- Hanja: 平澤芝制驛
- Revised Romanization: Pyeongtaekjije-yeok
- McCune–Reischauer: P'yŏngt'aekchije-yŏk

General information
- Location: 141 Jije-dong, 777 Gyeonggidaero, Pyeongtaek City, Gyeonggi Province
- Operator: Korail
- Lines: Gyeongbu Line; Suseo–Pyeongtaek high-speed railway
- Platforms: 2
- Tracks: 2

Construction
- Structure type: Aboveground

Key dates
- June 30, 2006: Line 1 opened
- December 9, 2016: KTX opened

Passengers
- (Daily) Based on Jan-Dec of 2012. Line 1: 1,723

Services
Preceding station	Seoul Metropolitan Subway	Following station
Seojeong-ri towards Kwangwoon University	Line 1	Pyeongtaek towards Sinchang
Preceding station	Korea Train Express	Following station
Dongtan towards Suseo	Gyeongbu KTX	Cheonan–Asan towards Busan
Dongtan towards Suseo	Honam KTX	Cheonan–Asan towards Mokpo
Dongtan towards Suseo	Jeolla KTX	Cheonan–Asan towards Yeosu Expo
Dongtan towards Suseo	Donghae KTX	Cheonan–Asan towards Pohang
Dongtan towards Suseo	Gyeongjeon KTX	Cheonan–Asan towards Jinju
Location

PyeongtaekJije Station (formerly known as Jije station) is a subway station located in Pyeongtaek, South Korea. It serves the KTX and Seoul Subway Line 1. A large E-Mart store is very close to the station. On 24 November 2020, the name was changed to PyeongtaekJije.

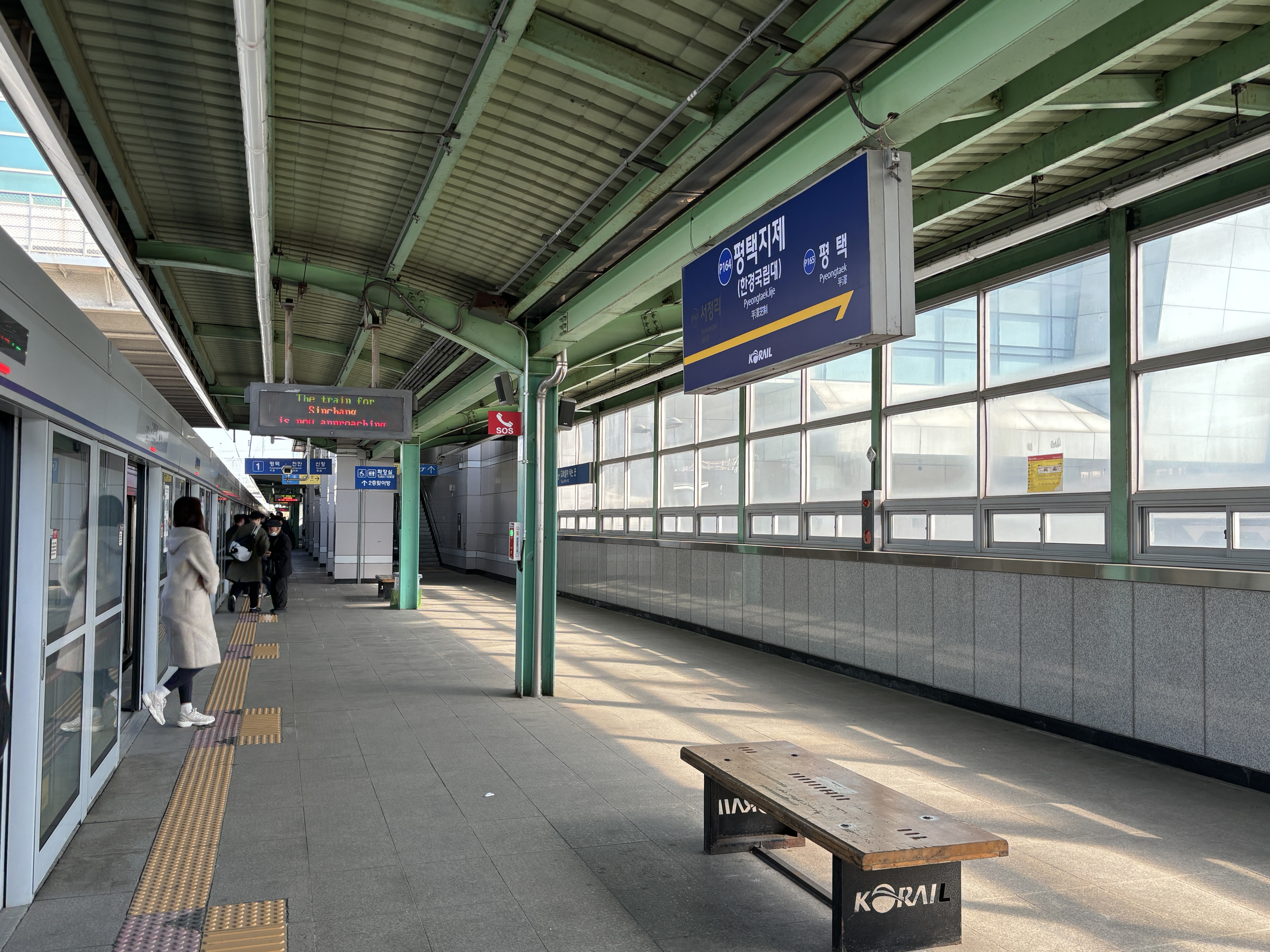
Line 1 platform

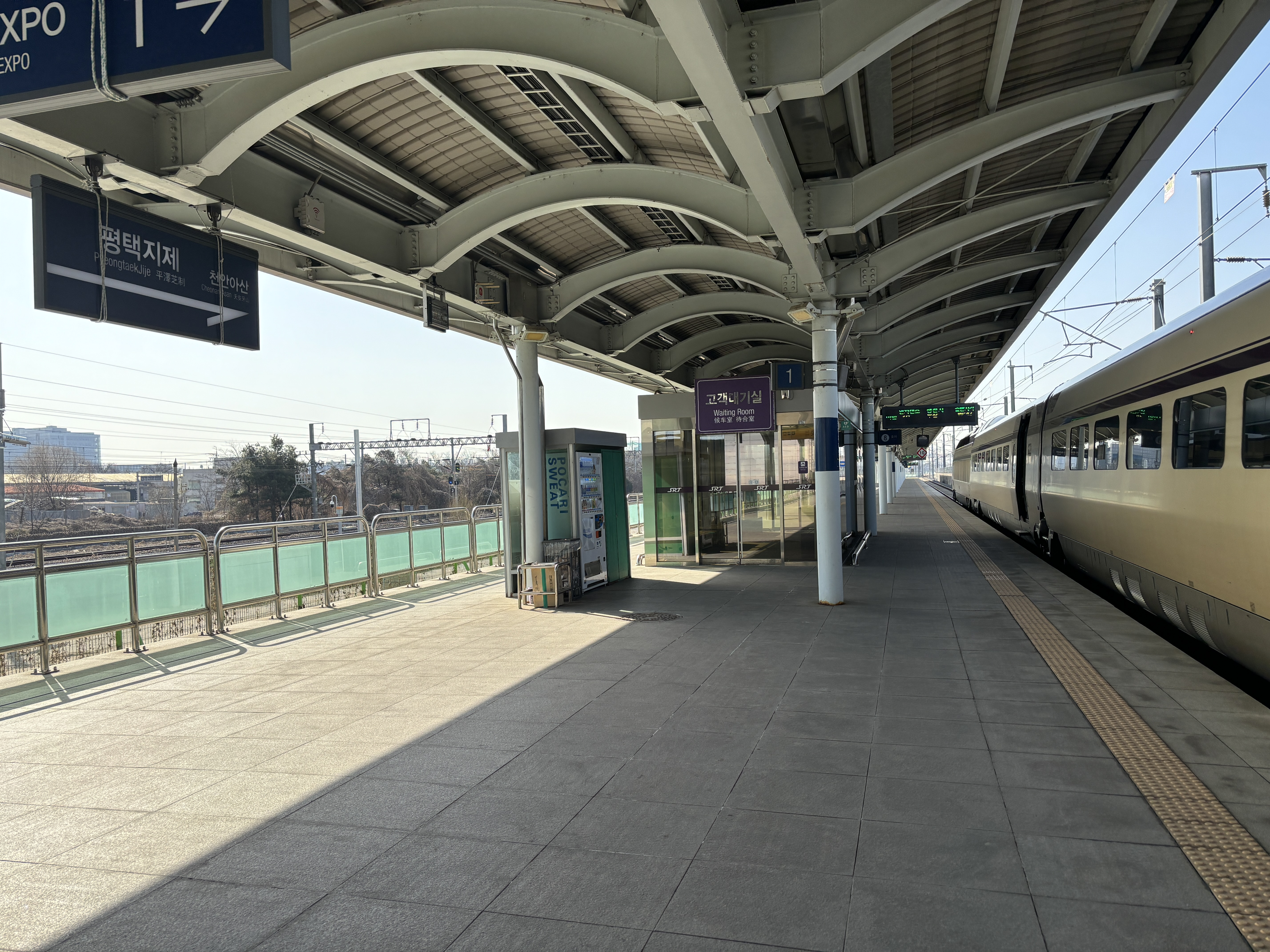
KTX platform

== Station layout ==
=== Korail Line 1 platforms ===
↑ Seojeong-ri
2 | | | | 1
Pyeongtaek ↓

1	Line 1	for Pyeongtaek · Cheonan · Sinchang
2	Line 1	for Suwon · Guro · Seoul Station · Kwangwoon Univ.

=== KTX platforms ===
↑ Dongtan
2 | | | | 1
Cheonan–Asan ↓

1	for Busan · Jinju · Mokpo · Yeosu Expo · Pohang
2	for Suseo
