= Suseo–Pyeongtaek high-speed railway =

South Korean railway line

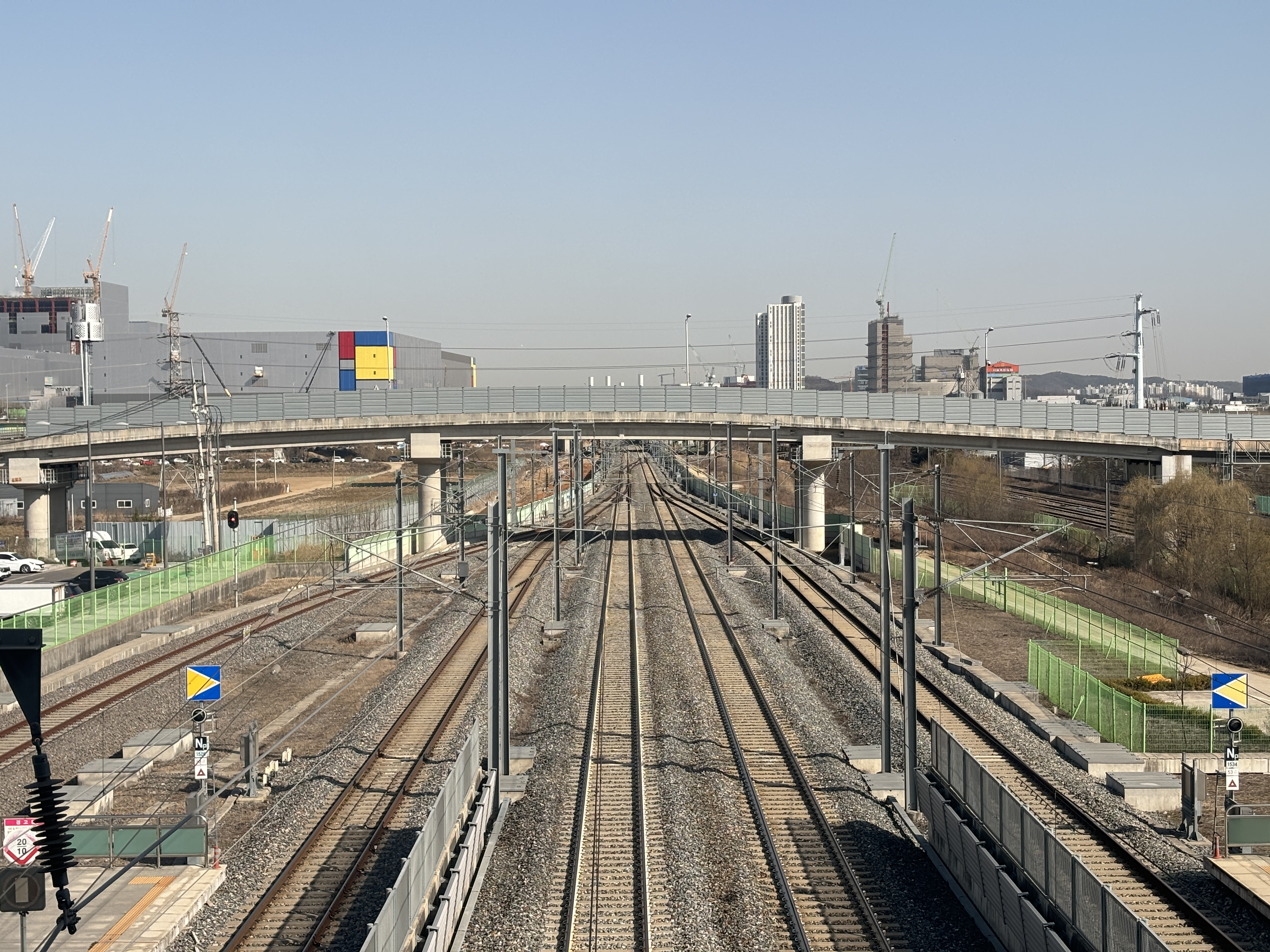
- Tracks at PyeongtaekJije Station

Overview
- Other name: Suseo HSR
- Status: Operational
- Owner: Korea Rail Network Authority
- Line number: 103 (Korea Rail Network Authority)
- Locale: South Korea
- Termini: Suseo; PyeongtaekJije
- Stations: 3

Service
- Type: High-speed rail
- Operator: Korea Rail Network Authority (Since September 2026)
- Rolling stock: KTX-Sancheon Class 120000; KTX-Sancheon Class 130000

History
- Opened: 9 December 2016

Technical
- Line length: 61.1 km (38.0 mi) (Note: Inclusive of tracks from PyeongtaekJije Station to end junction)
- Track gauge: 1,435 mm (4 ft 8 1/2 in) standard gauge
- Electrification: 25 kV/60 Hz overhead catenary
- Operating speed: 305 km/h (190 mph)

Korean name
- Hangul: 수서평택고속선
- Hanja: 水西平澤高速線
- RR: Suseo Pyeongtaek gosokseon
- MR: Susŏ P'yŏngt'aek kosoksŏn
map_name
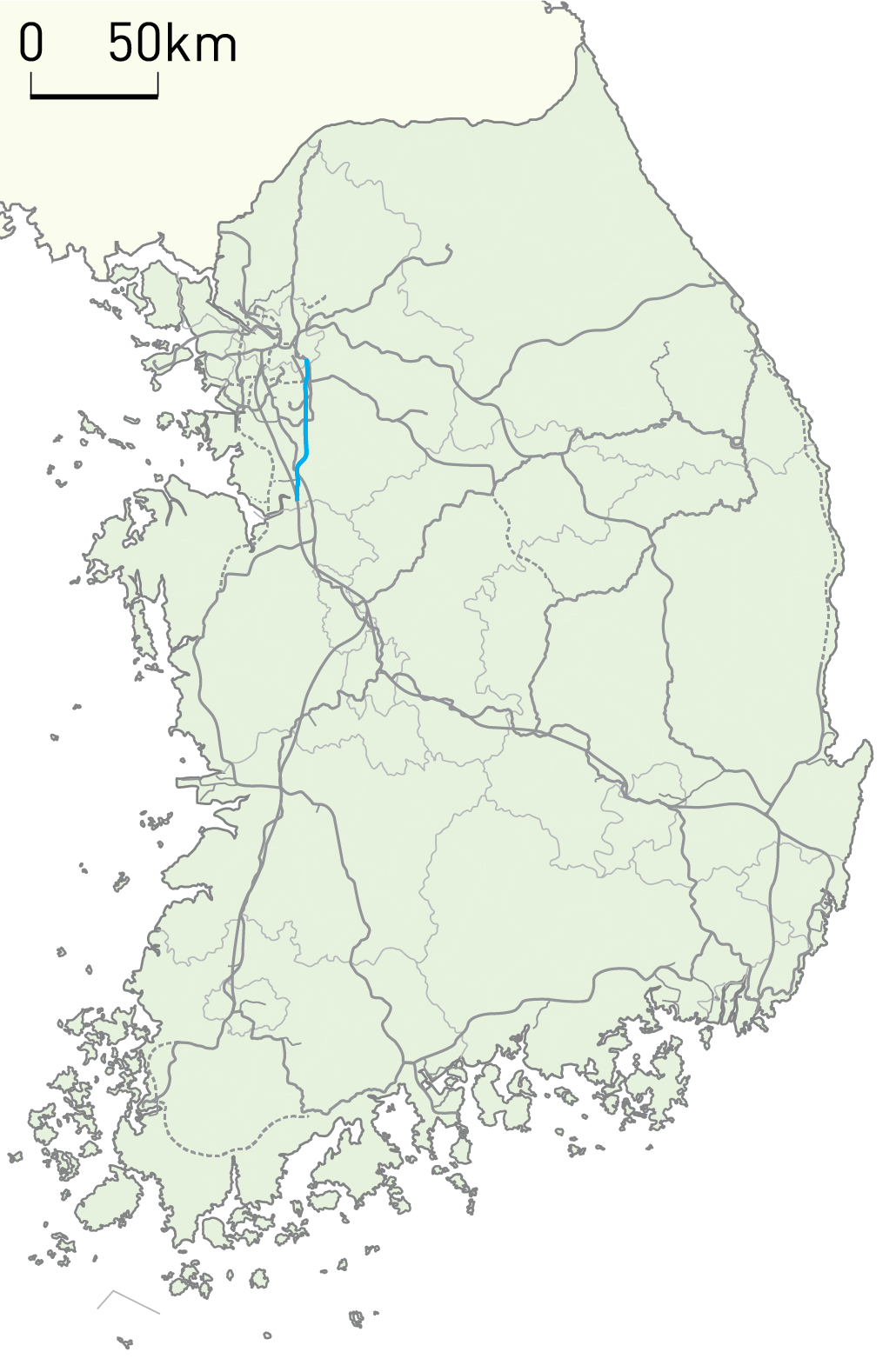

The Suseo–Pyeongtaek high-speed railway (Korean: 수서평택고속선; formerly known as Sudogwon HSR Line), also known as Suseo–Pyeongtaek HSR, is a high-speed rail line from Suseo station in southeast Seoul to a junction with the existing Gyeongbu high-speed railway in South Korea. The line was built to ensure southeast Seoul (or Gangnam area) and southern Gyeonggi-do have high-speed rail connections.

== History ==
=== Origins of the project ===
While South Korea's first high-speed line, the Gyeongbu high-speed railway (Gyeongbu HSR) was in construction between Seoul and Busan, the government considered a second line from Seoul to Mokpo, the Honam high-speed railway (Honam HSR). The first feasibility study in 2003 came to the conclusion that the construction of a full line is not justified by demand, and proposed a two-stage construction. The first stage, to be realised by 2015, would involve two branches from the Gyeongbu HSR, one of which would lead to a second Seoul terminus at Suseo in the southeast part of the city. However, in plans made official in August 2006, the Suseo branch was no longer included.

The Suseo branch was re-launched as a separate project, the Metropolitan Area high-speed railway (initially the Suseo high-speed railway), on June 1, 2008, to improve traffic connections to two new housing development areas situated along the line in Dongtan.

=== Planning stage ===
Preliminary plans foresaw a 60.7 km (37.7 mi) long line from Suseo to the junction with the Gyeongbu HSR near Pyeongtaek, and three new KTX stations at Suseo, Dongtan and Pyeongtaek, with the last one situated after the junction on the Gyeongbu HSR. The line was to run in a tunnel at a depth of 50 m (160 ft) between Suseo and Dongtan, and construction with a budget of 4.18 trillion South Korean won was foreseen to be complete in 2015. The travel time from Suseo to Dongtan was foreseen to be 12 minutes. The target date for finishing the line was later moved ahead to 2014.

The basic design was completed on April 28, 2010. The planned length of the line changed to 61.1 km (38.0 mi), and planned stations reduced to two, at Suseo and Dongtan. The government set out a timeplan, according to which detailed design was to commence immediately, and construction was to take place from the second half of 2011 until the end of 2014. The first detailed design contracts were awarded in September 2010.

Once the line is completed, the expected travel time will be 1 hour 59 minutes from Suseo to Busan via the Gyeongbu HSR, and 1 hour 49 minutes from Suseo to Mokpo via the Honam HSR.

=== Longer term plans ===
On September 1, 2010, the South Korean government announced a strategic plan to reduce travel times from Seoul to 95% of the country to under two hours by 2020. As part of the plan, tracks for up to 230 km/h (143 mph) are to connect Suseo and Yongsan in central Seoul.

In November 2020, MOLIT announced extension of Suseo–Pyeongtaek high-speed railway to Uijeongbu. However, no completion date for the extension was announced.

== Stations ==
List of stations on Suseo–Pyeongtaek high-speed railway
Station			Station distance	Line distance	Transfers	Location	
English	Hangul	Hanja	km		Transfers	Location	
Suseo	수서	水西	—	0.2	Suin–Bundang Line Great Train eXpress	Seoul	Gangnam-gu
Dongtan	동탄	東灘	32.4	32.6	Great Train eXpress	Gyeonggi-do	Hwaseong-si
PyeongtaekJije	평택지제	平澤芝制	21.0	53.6	Seoul Subway Line 1	Gyeonggi-do	Pyeongtaek-si
↓ Through-service to/from Busan/Mokpo via Gyeongbu HSR/Honam HSR ↓

== Rolling stock ==
- KTX-Sancheon Class 120000
- KTX-Sancheon Class 130000
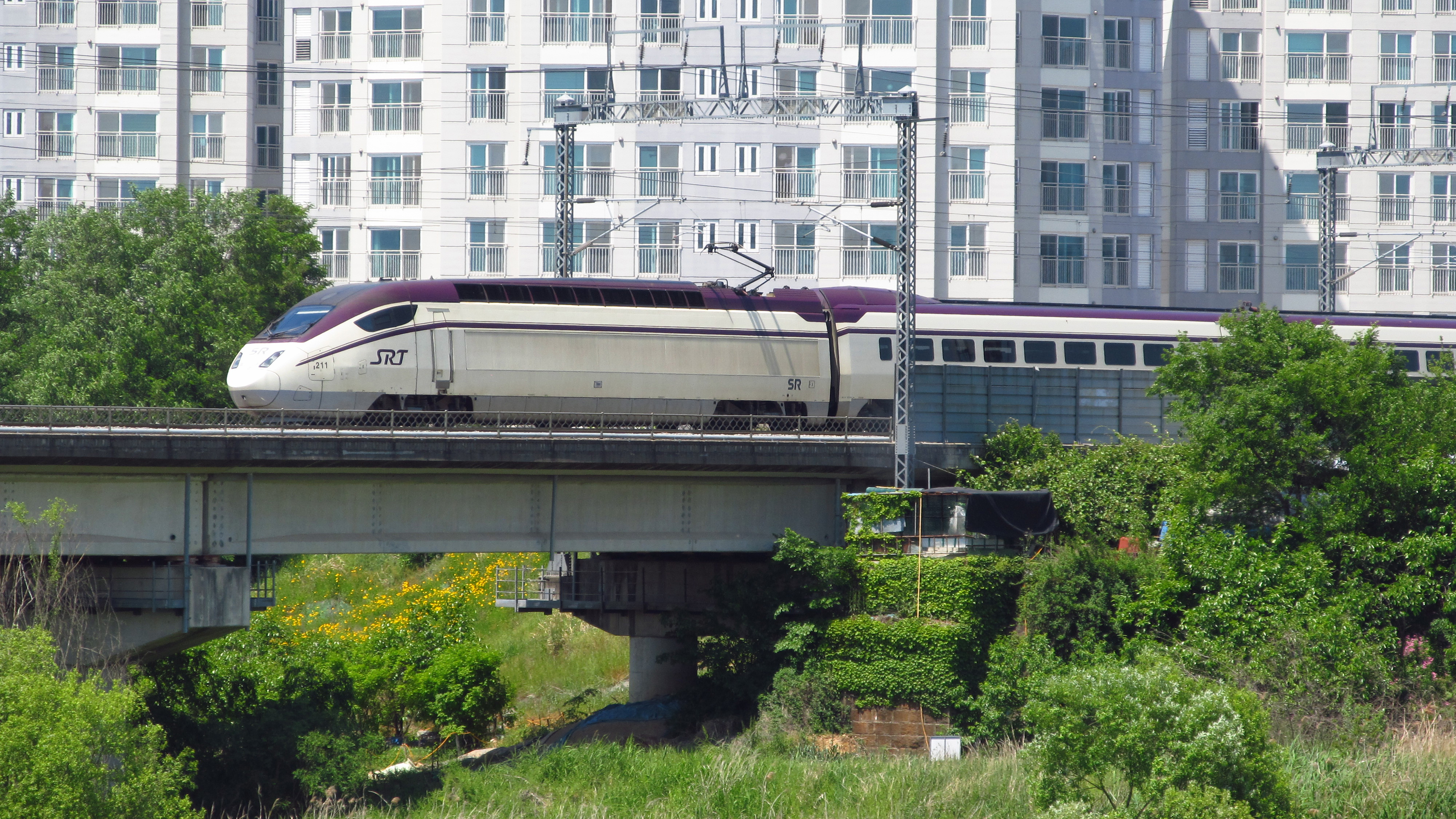
KTX-Sancheon Class 120000

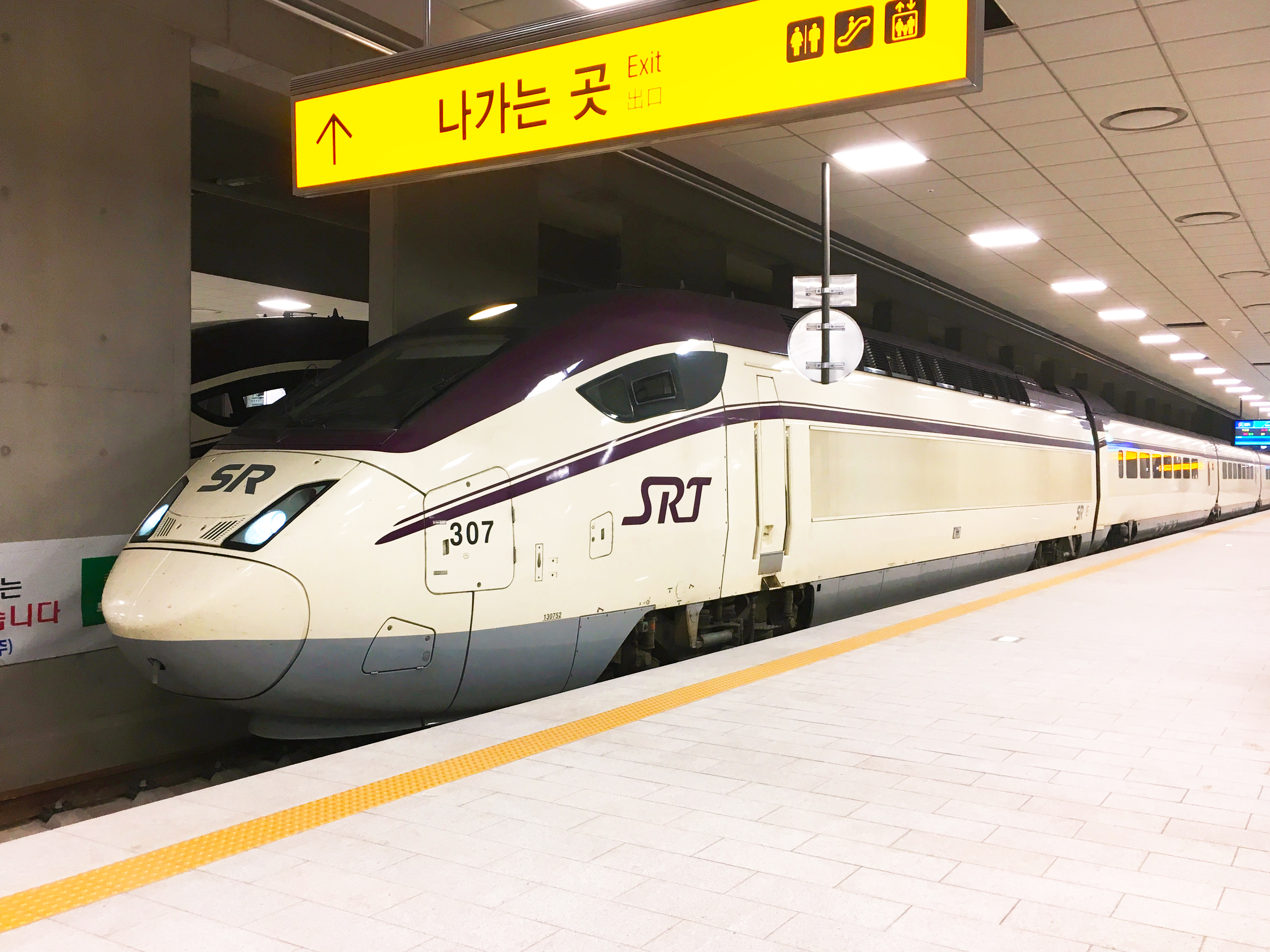
KTX-Sancheon Class 130000

== Operation ==
The Suseo–Pyeongtaek high-speed railway is currently utilized by Super Rapid Train (SRT) high-speed rail service.
