= Dongtan station =

Train station in Hwaseong, South Korea

동탄
Dongtan
동탄; Dongtan
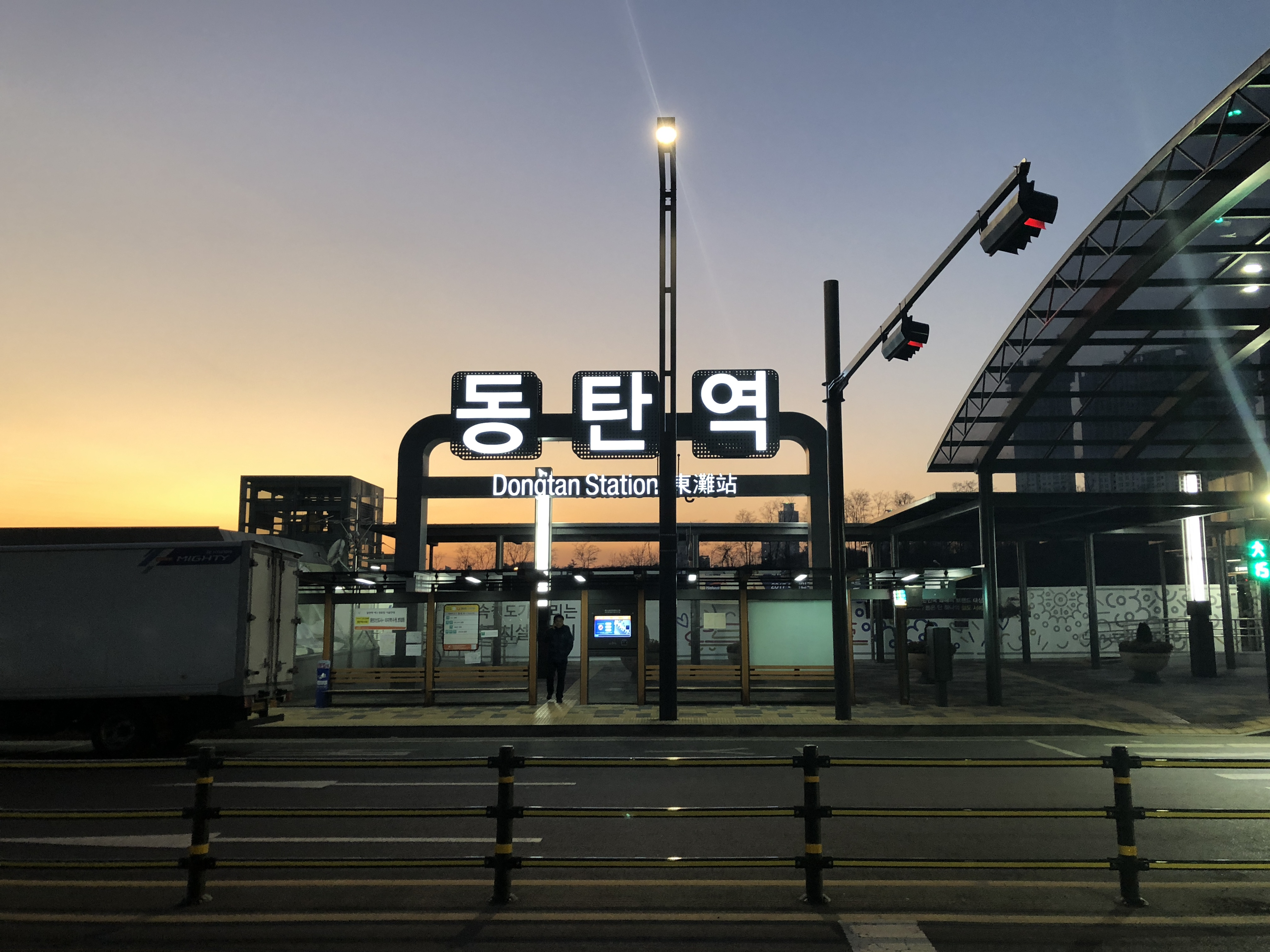
- Dongtan station

Korean name
- Hangul: 동탄역
- Hanja: 東灘驛
- RR: Dongtan-yeok
- MR: Tongt'an-yŏk

General information
- Location: Hwaseong City, Gyeonggi Province
- Coordinates: 37.201167°N 127.095111°E
- Operator: Korail; GTX-A Operation
- Line: Suseo–Pyeongtaek high-speed railway

Construction
- Structure type: Underground

Key dates
- December 9, 2016: KTX opened
- March 30, 2024: GTX-A opened

Services
Preceding station	Korea Train Express	Following station
Suseo Terminus	Gyeongbu KTX	PyeongtaekJije towards Busan
Suseo Terminus	Honam KTX	PyeongtaekJije towards Mokpo
Suseo Terminus	Jeolla KTX	PyeongtaekJije towards Yeosu-Expo
Suseo Terminus	Donghae KTX	PyeongtaekJije towards Pohang
Suseo Terminus	Gyeongjeon KTX	PyeongtaekJije towards Jinju
Preceding station	Seoul Metropolitan Subway	Following station
Guseong towards Suseo	GTX-A	Terminus
Location

Dongtan station (Korean: 동탄역; Hanja: 東灘驛; RR: Dongtang-yeok) is a station on the Suseo–Pyeongtaek high-speed railway, KTX, and GTX-A. The former began to operate from December 9, 2016. This station is in the Yulhyeon Tunnel.

== Station layout ==
=== Platforms ===
↑ Suseo (KTX)/↑ Guseong (GTX-A)
| 32 | | | | 14 |
PyeongtaekJije (KTX) ↓/ Terminus (GTX-A) ↓

3	GTX-A	for Suseo
2		for Suseo
1		for Busan · Jinju · Mokpo · Yeosu-Expo · Pohang
4	GTX-A	Terminus

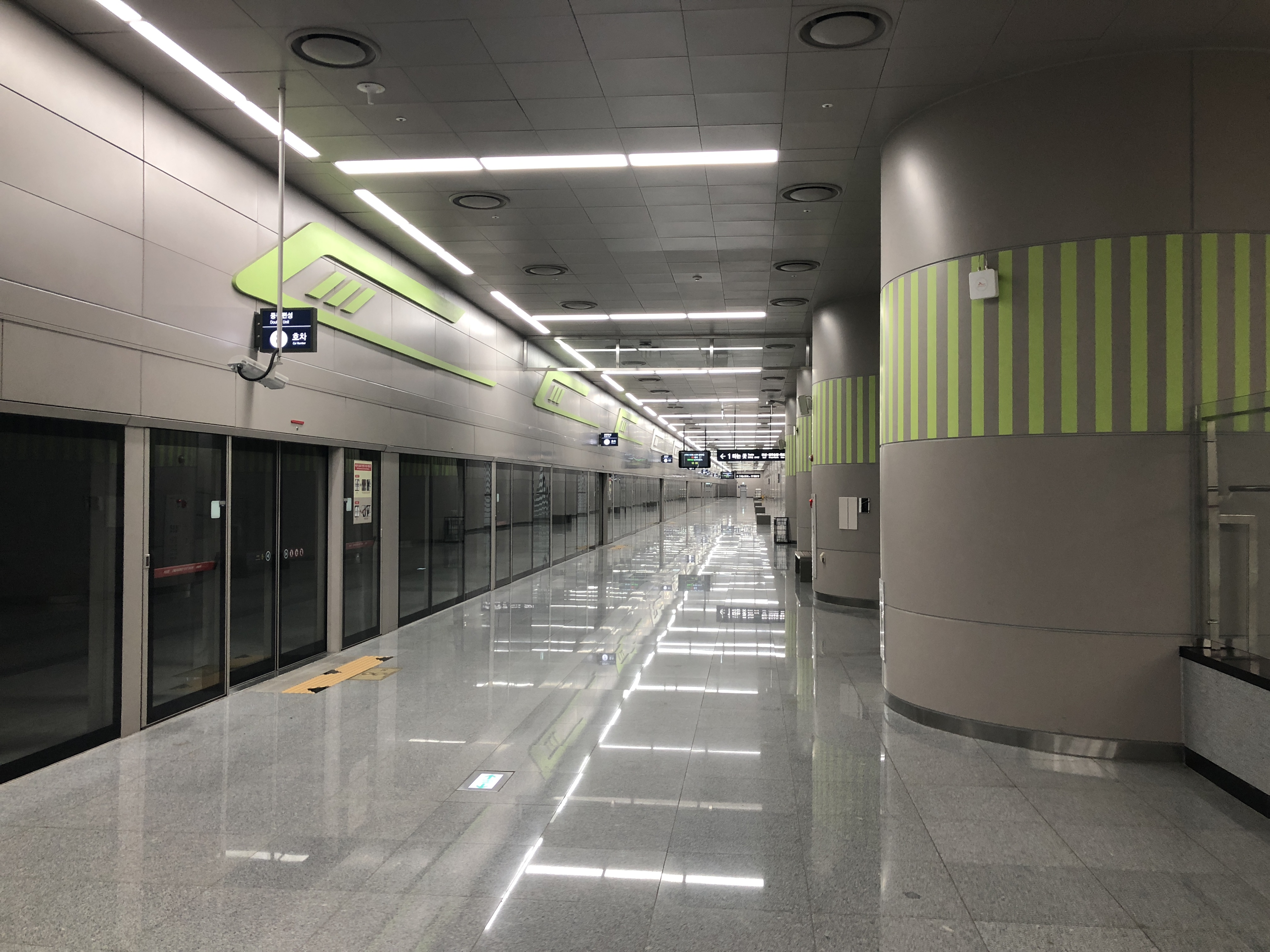
KTX platforms

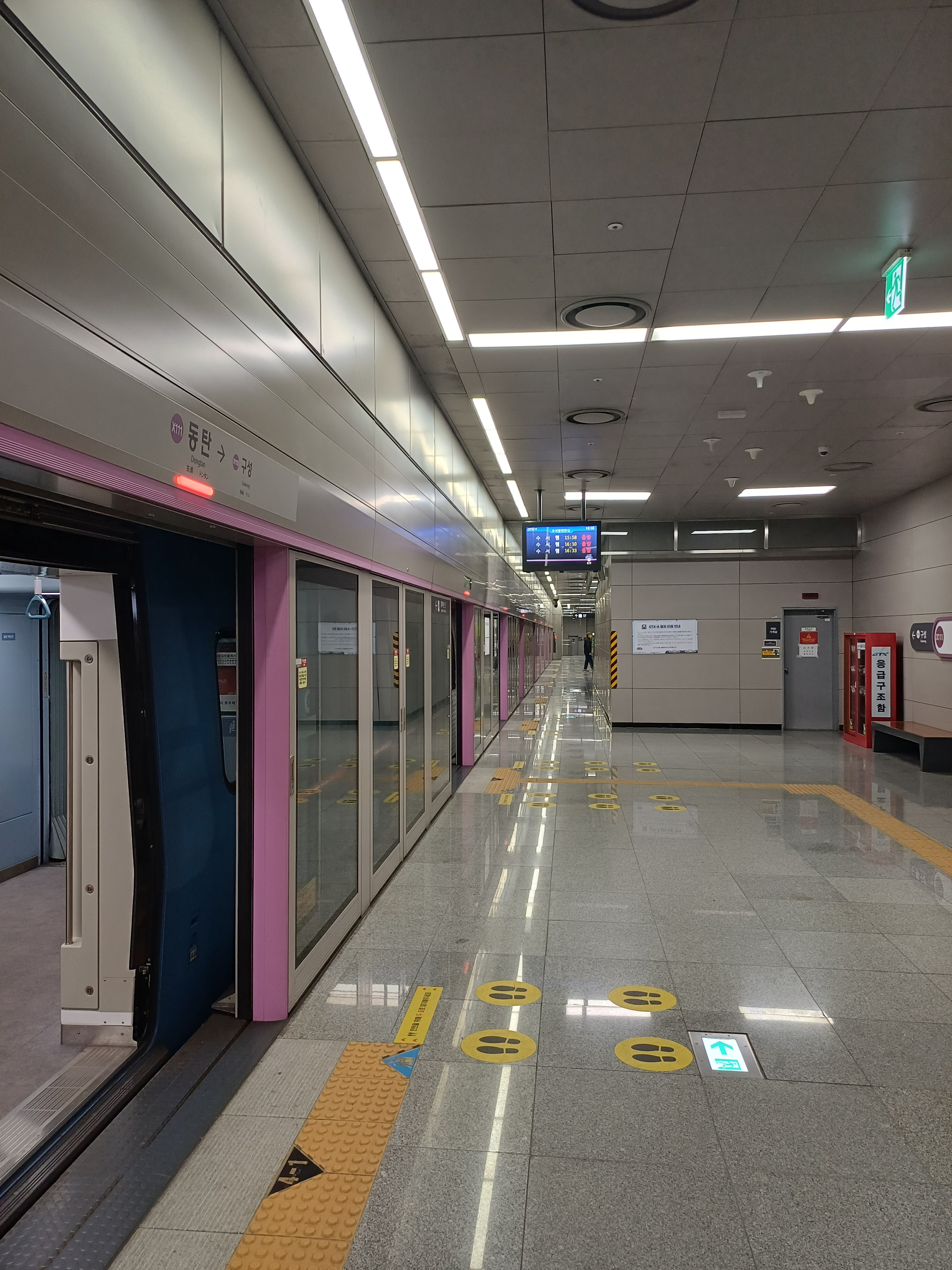
GTX-A platforms

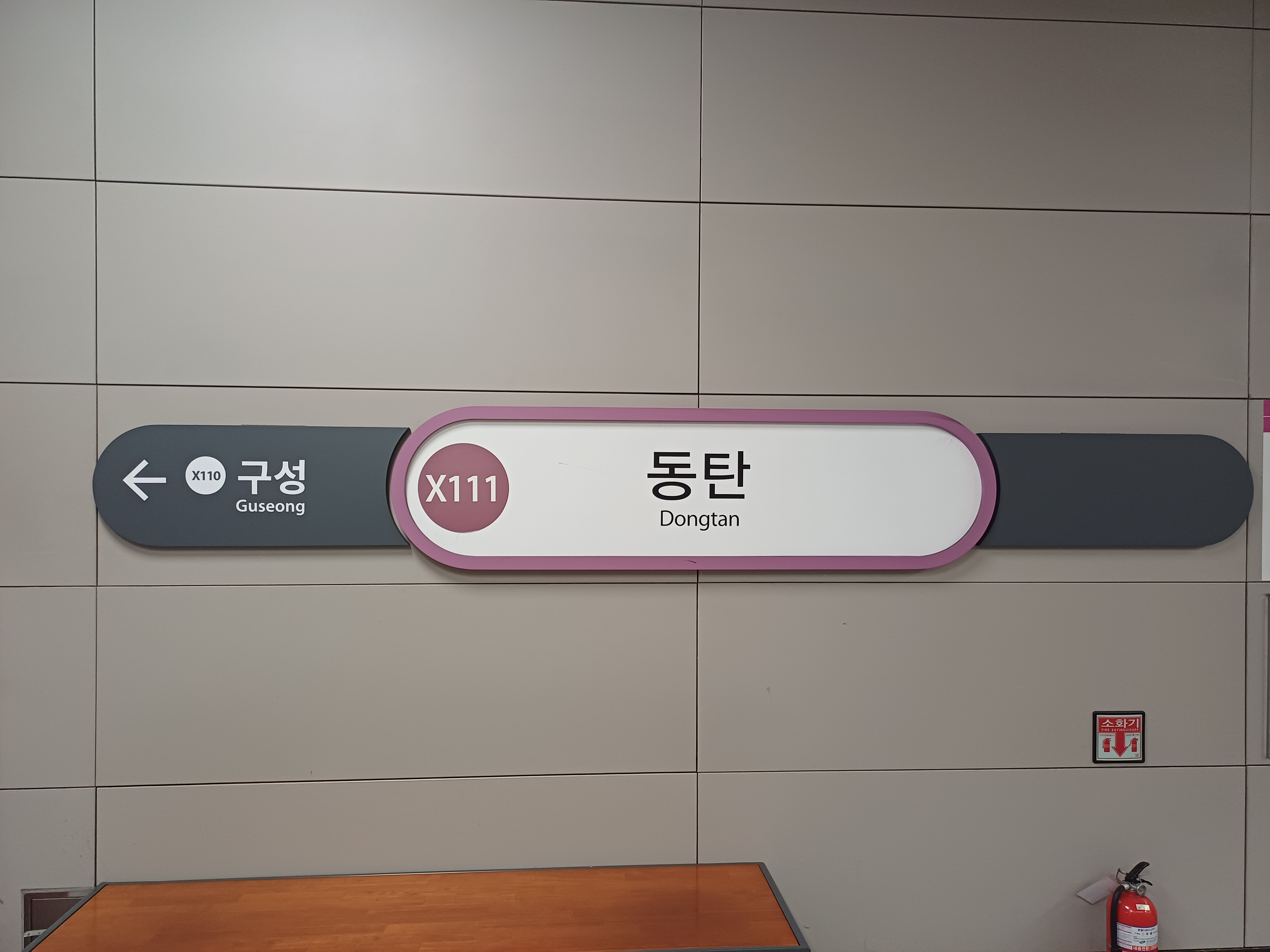
GTX-A station name sign
