= Suseo Station =

Subway station in Seoul, South Korea

수서
Suseo
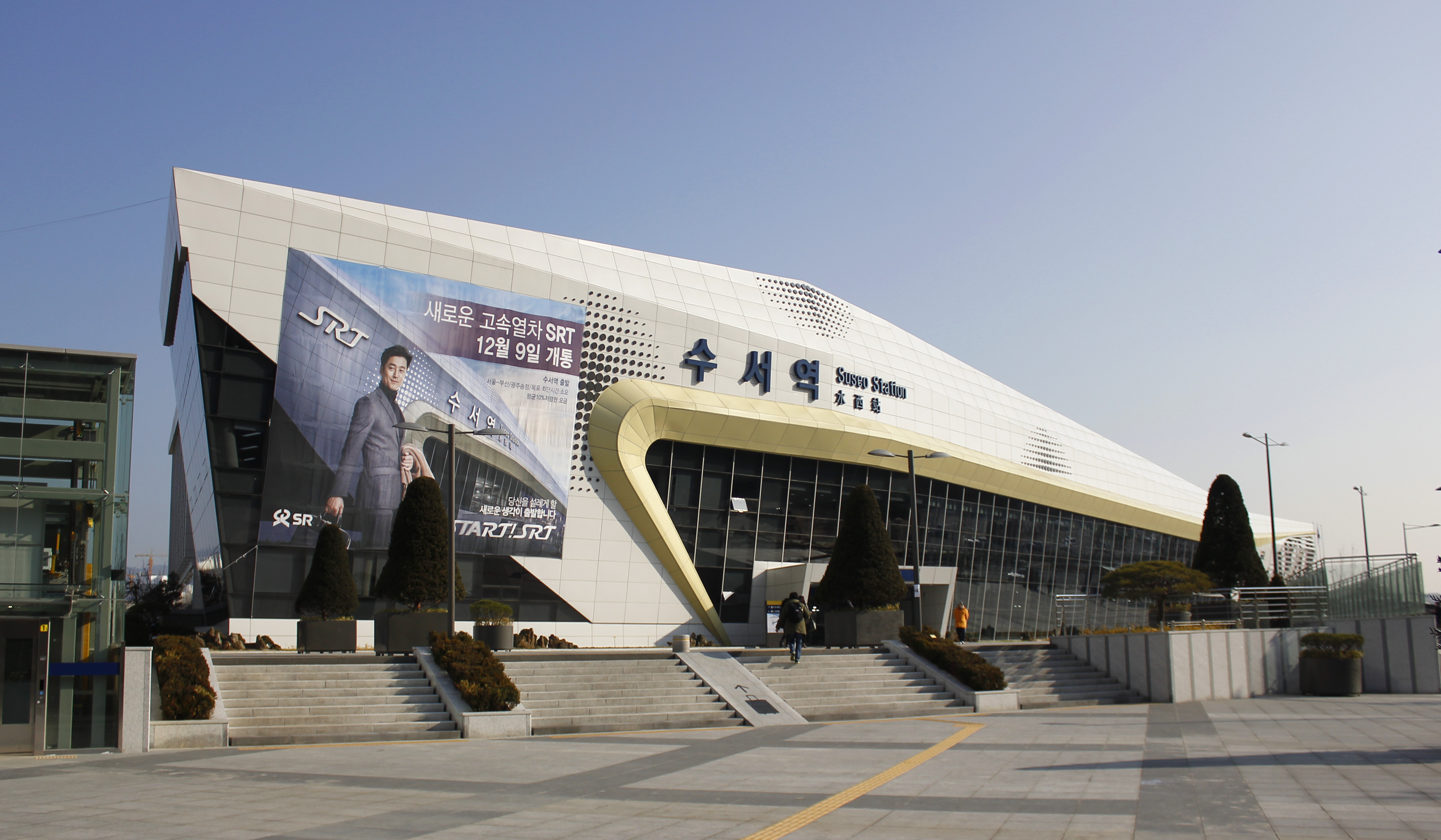

General information
- Location: Suseo-dong, Gangnam; Seoul
- Operator: Korail
- Line: Suseo–Pyeongtaek HSR Line
- Platforms: 3
- Tracks: 6

Construction
- Structure type: Ground

History
- Opened: December 9, 2016
Services
Preceding station	Korea Train Express	Following station
Terminus	Gyeongbu KTX	Dongtan towards Busan
Terminus	Honam KTX	Dongtan towards Mokpo
Terminus	Jeolla KTX	Dongtan towards Yeosu-Expo
Terminus	Donghae KTX	Dongtan towards Pohang
Terminus	Gyeongjeon KTX	Dongtan towards Jinju
Location

Suseo station (Korean: 수서역; Hanja: 水西驛; RR: Suseo-yeok) is a railroad station on the Suin–Bundang Line and Line 3 of the Seoul Metropolitan Subway. The station is in the Suseo neighborhood of the Gangnam District in Seoul, South Korea. Prior to the Line 3 extension to Ogeum station in 2010, Suseo was the former southeastern terminus of Line 3. Along with Yangjae, Suseo serves as an important transfer point between Line 3 and buses from/to southern cities such as Seongnam, Yongin, and Suwon.

In December 2016, it became the northern connection point to the Suseo–Pyeongtaek high-speed railway running KTX.

On 30 March 2024, Suseo became the northern terminus of the first phase of Line A of the GTX. From this station, the GTX travels south and shares tracks with the KTX on the right-of-way inside the Yulhyeon Tunnel and Suseo–Pyeongtaek high-speed railway. The platforms of the GTX are separate from those of the KTX.

In the future, Bundang Line station plans to install evacuation lines on the platform as part of the express train operation. The Suseo Pyeongtaek Express Line is an underground section from this station to Dongtan station.

== Services ==
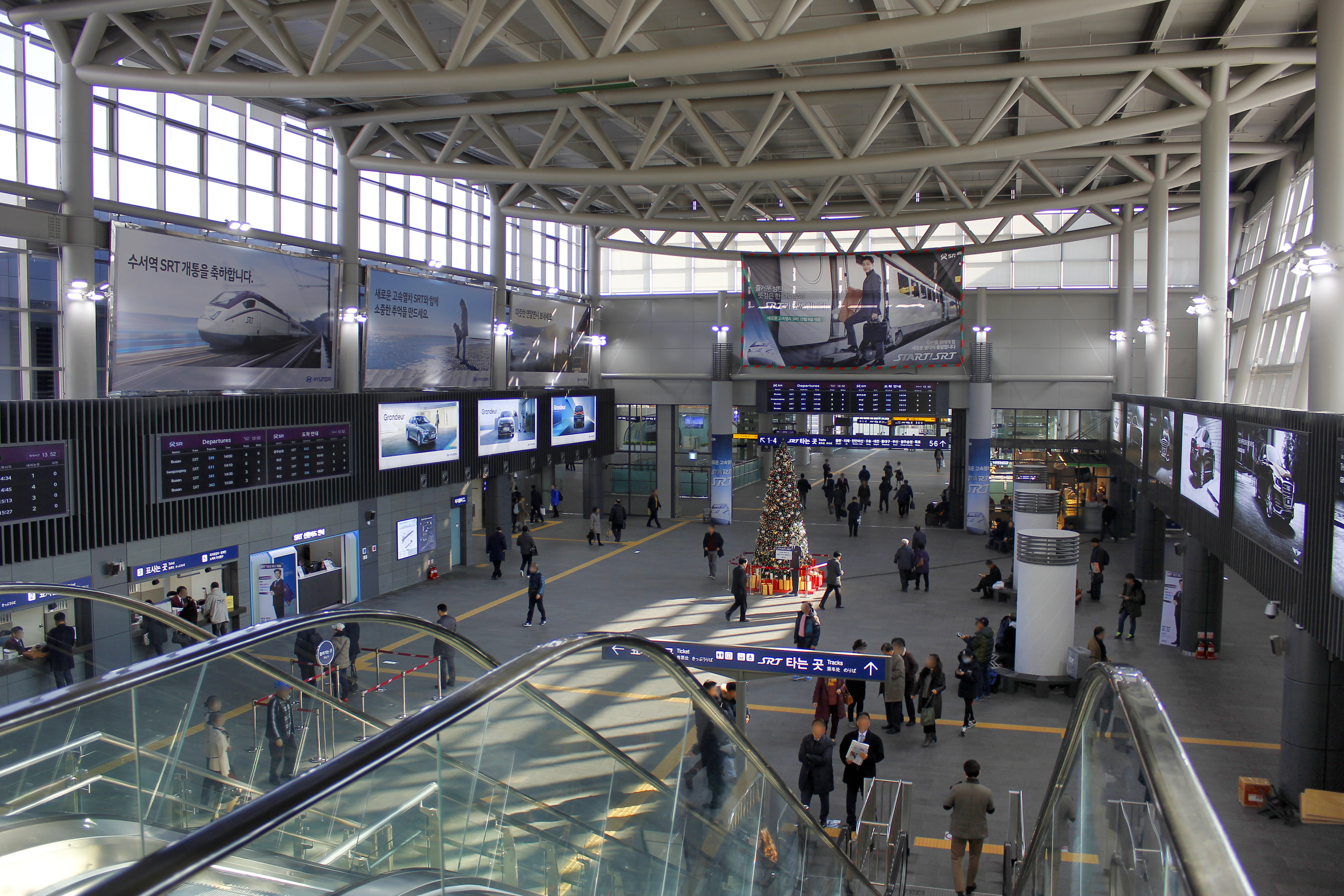
Inside Suseo station

=== KTX ===
Suseo is the terminus of KTX trains including:

- All trains that run Suseo–Pyeongtaek high-speed railway and directly to Daejeon, Daegu, Pohang, Jinju and Busan by the Gyeongbu High-speed railway
- All trains that run Suseo–Pyeongtaek high-speed railway and directly to Iksan, Yeosu-Expo, GwangjuSongjeong and Mokpo by the Honam High-speed railway

=== Seoul Subway ===
Seoul Subway serves the station with Line 3 and Suin–Bundang Line.

=== GTX ===
The GTX-A line linking Dongtan to Suseo opened on 30 March 2024. A connection north to Seoul Station and further to Paju City will open sometime in 2026.

== Station layout ==
=== KTX platforms ===
Terminus
| 65 | | 43 | | 21 |
Dongtan ↓

1·2	for Busan · Jinju · Mokpo · Yeosu-Expo · Pohang
3·4	for Busan · Jinju · Mokpo · Yeosu-Expo · Pohang
5·6	for Busan · Jinju · Mokpo · Yeosu-Expo · Pohang

=== Seoul Metro platforms (Line 3) ===
수서; Suseo
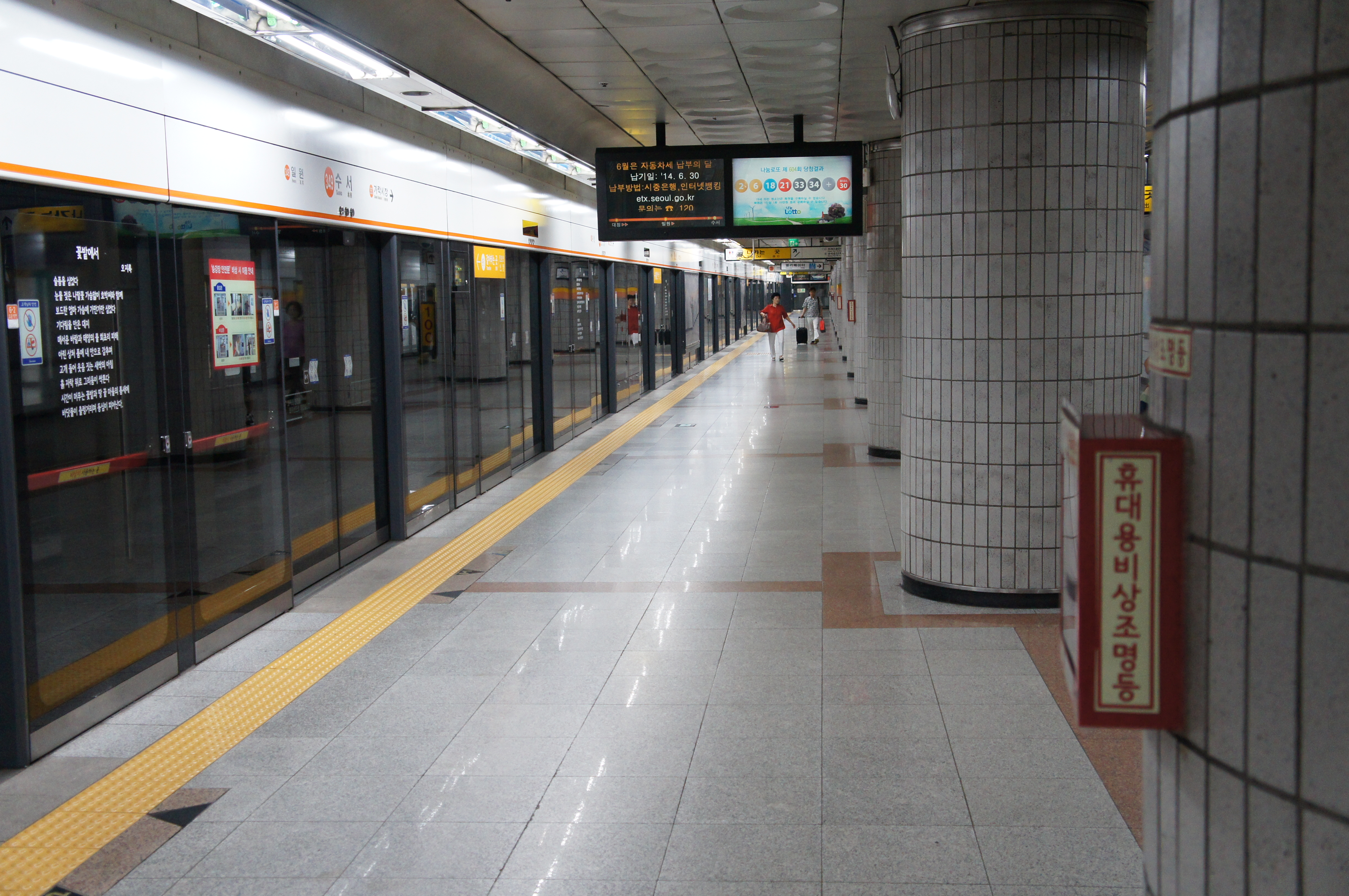
- Line 3 platform

General information
- Location: Suseo-dong, Gangnam; Seoul
- Operator: Seoul Metro
- Line: Line 3
- Platforms: 3
- Tracks: 2

Construction
- Structure type: Underground
- Accessible: Yes

History
- Opened: October 30, 1993
Services
Preceding station	Seoul Metropolitan Subway	Following station
Irwon towards Daehwa	Line 3	Garak Market towards Ogeum
Location

Irwon ↑
2 | | 13 |
↓ Garak Market

1	Line 3	for Express Bus Terminal · Jongno 3(sam)-ga · Gupabal · Daehwa
2	Line 3	for National Police Hospital · Ogeum or Alighting Passengers Only
3	Line 3	for Express Bus Terminal · Jongno 3-ga · Gupabal · Daehwa

=== Korail platforms (Suin–Bundang Line) ===
수서; Suseo
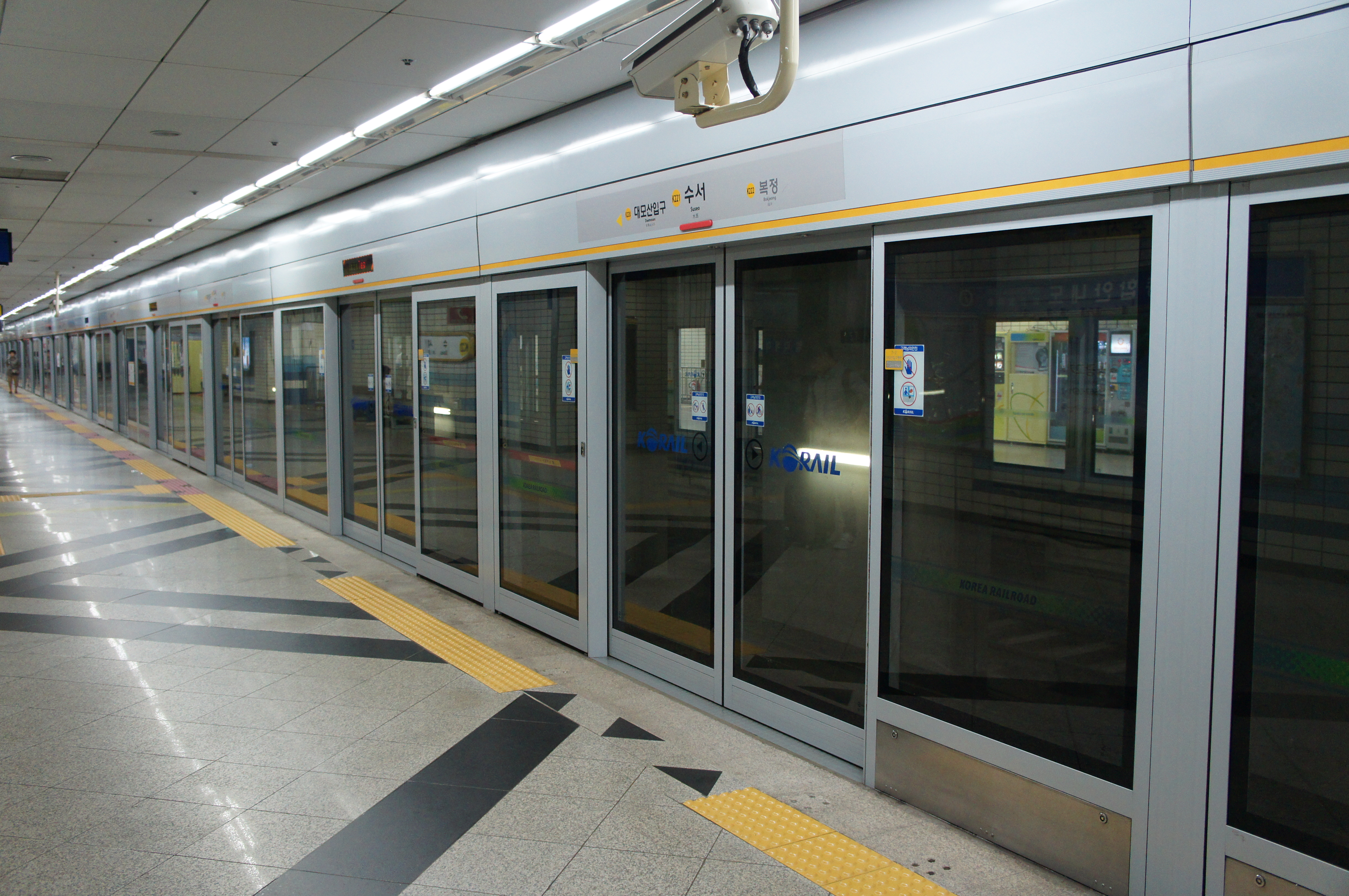
- Suin–Bundang Line platform

General information
- Location: Suseo-dong, Gangnam; Seoul
- Operator: Korail
- Line: Suin–Bundang Line
- Platforms: 2
- Tracks: 2

Construction
- Structure type: Underground
- Accessible: Yes

History
- Opened: September 1, 1994
Services
Preceding station	Seoul Metropolitan Subway	Following station
Daemosan towards Cheongnyangni	Suin–Bundang Line	Bokjeong towards Incheon
Location

↑ Daemosan
2 | | 1
Bokjeong ↓

1	Suin–Bundang Line	for Moran · Yatap · Seohyeon · Suwon · Incheon
2	Suin–Bundang Line	for Guryong · Seonjeongneung · Wangsimni · Cheongnyangni

=== GTX-A ===
수서; Suseo
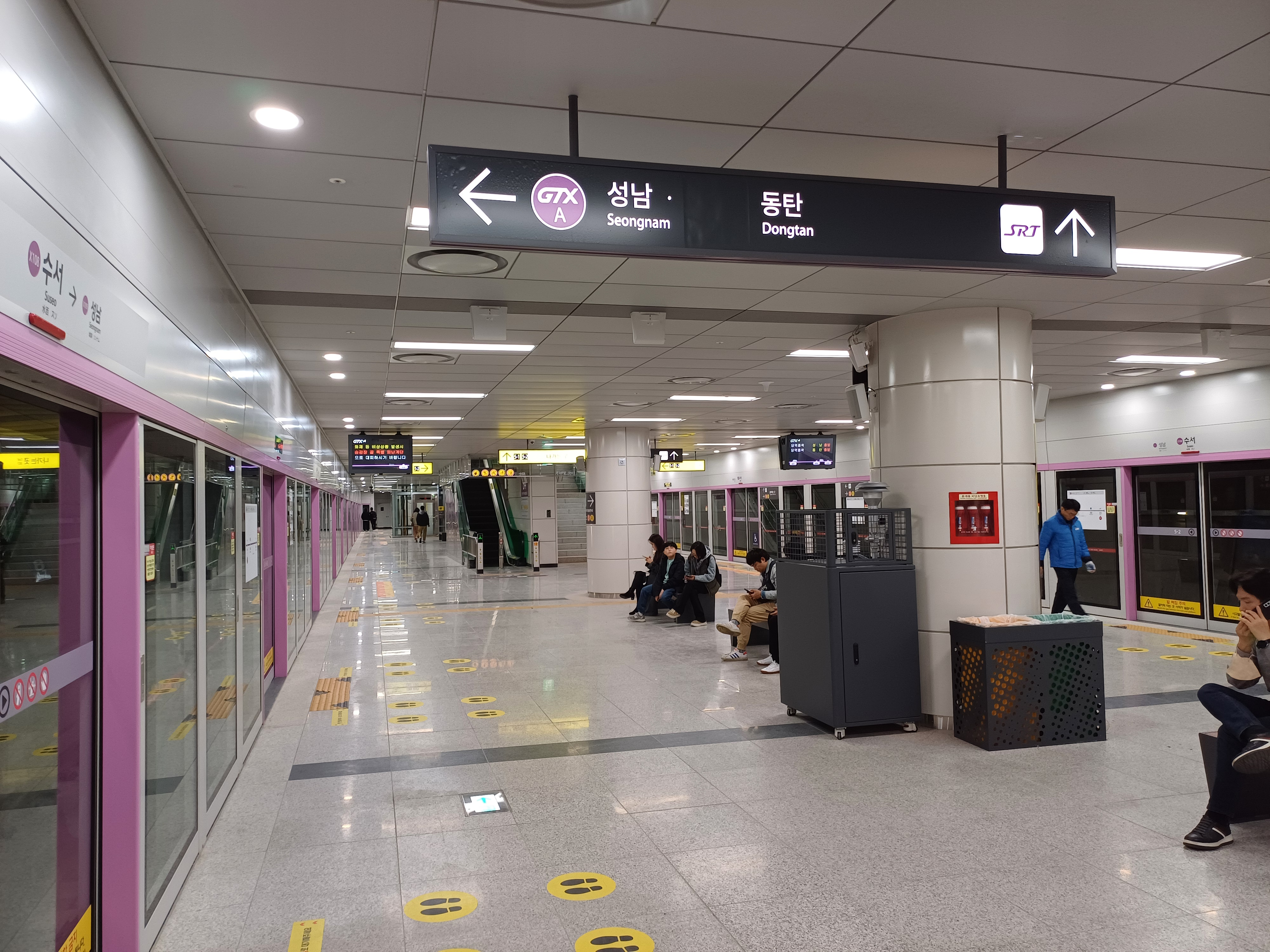
- GTX-A platform

General information
- Location: Suseo-dong, Gangnam; Seoul
- Operator: GTX-A Operation
- Line: GTX-A
- Platforms: 1
- Tracks: 2

Construction
- Structure type: Underground
- Accessible: Yes

History
- Opened: March 30, 2024
Services
Preceding station	Seoul Metropolitan Subway	Following station
Terminus	GTX-A	Seongnam towards Dongtan
Location

The GTX platforms are located separately from the KTX platforms.

↑ Terminus
2 | | 1
Seongnam ↓

1	GTX-A	for Guseong · Dongtan
2	GTX-A	Terminus

== Gallery ==
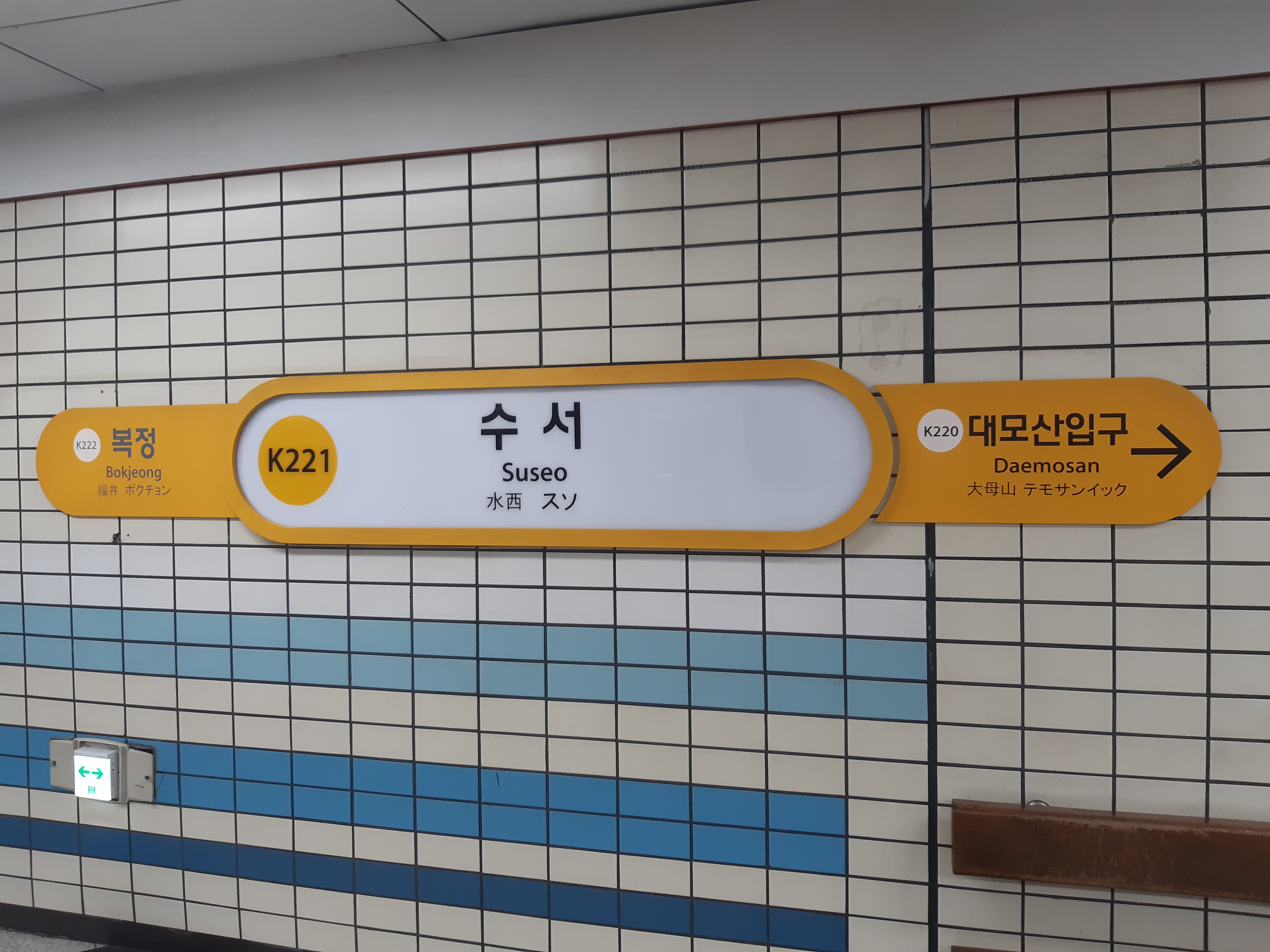
Station nameplate (Suin–Bundang Line)

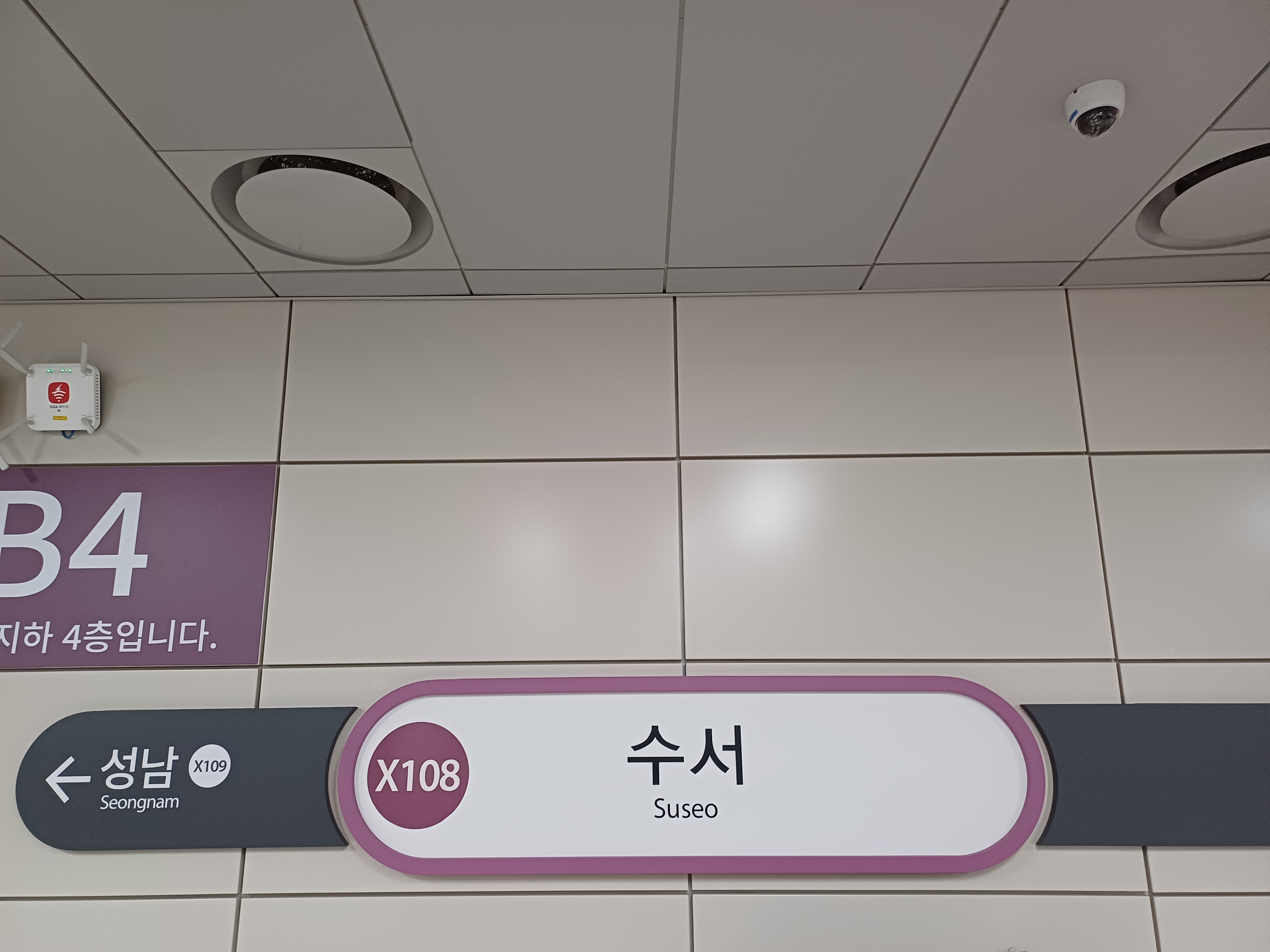
Station nameplate (GTX-A)

== Exits ==
Exit No.	Image	Destinations
1		Sindonga APT
1-1		Daejin Design High School
2		Samik APT
3		Sejong High School, Suseo Elementary & Middle Schools
4		Suseo E-Mart
5		Daegok Elementary School, Mido APT
6		Gungmaeul
