= Mangwolsa station =

Metro station in Uijeongbu, South Korea

망월사 (신한대 제1캠퍼스); Mangwolsa (Shinhan Univ. Campus No. 1)
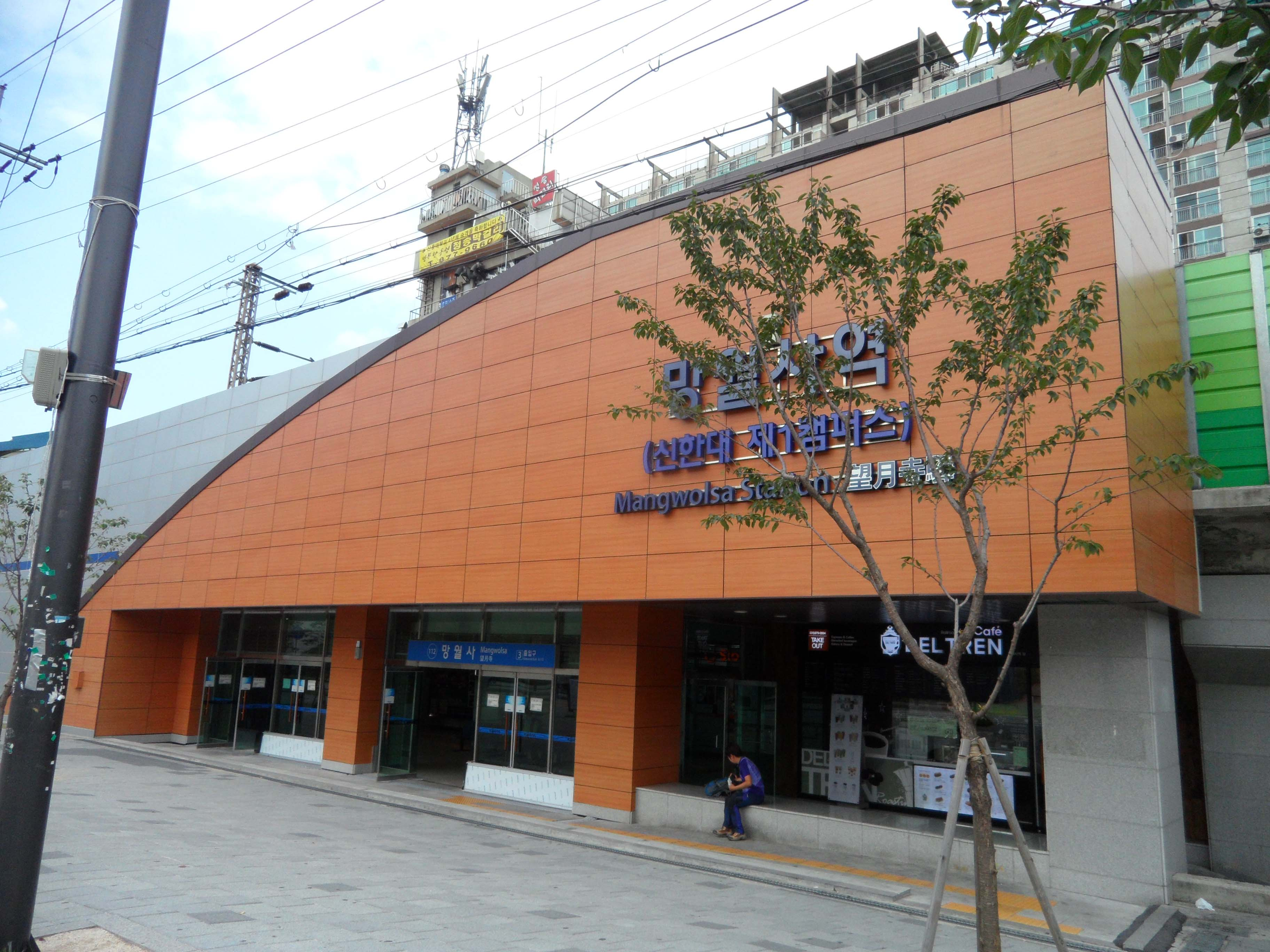
- Mangwolsa station

Korean name
- Hangul: 망월사역
- Hanja: 望月寺驛
- Revised Romanization: Mang-wolsa-yeok
- McCune–Reischauer: Mangwŏlsa-yŏk

General information
- Location: 221 Pyeonghwa-ro, Uijeongbu-si, Gyeonggi-do; South Korea
- Coordinates: 37°42′37″N 127°02′51″E
- Operator: Korail
- Platforms: 2
- Tracks: 2

Construction
- Structure type: Aboveground

History
- Opened: June 21, 1966

Key dates
- September 2, 1986: Line 1 opened

Services
Preceding station	Seoul Metropolitan Subway	Following station
Hoeryong towards Yeoncheon	Line 1	Dobongsan towards Incheon
Location

Mangwolsa station is a metro station on Seoul Subway Line 1. Named after a Silla-era Buddhist temple in the mountains to the west, it is the first station for services leaving Seoul heading north, and lies in the city of Uijeongbu.

== Exits ==
- Exit 1: Jungnangcheon, Howon 1-dong Community Center
- Exit 2: Mangwolsa, Shinheung College, Hoam Elementary School, Howon-dong Community Center, Hoeryong Elementary School
- Exit 3: Shinheung College, Hoam Elementary School, Howon-dong Community Center
