= Dobong station =

Train station in Seoul, South Korea

도봉; Dobong
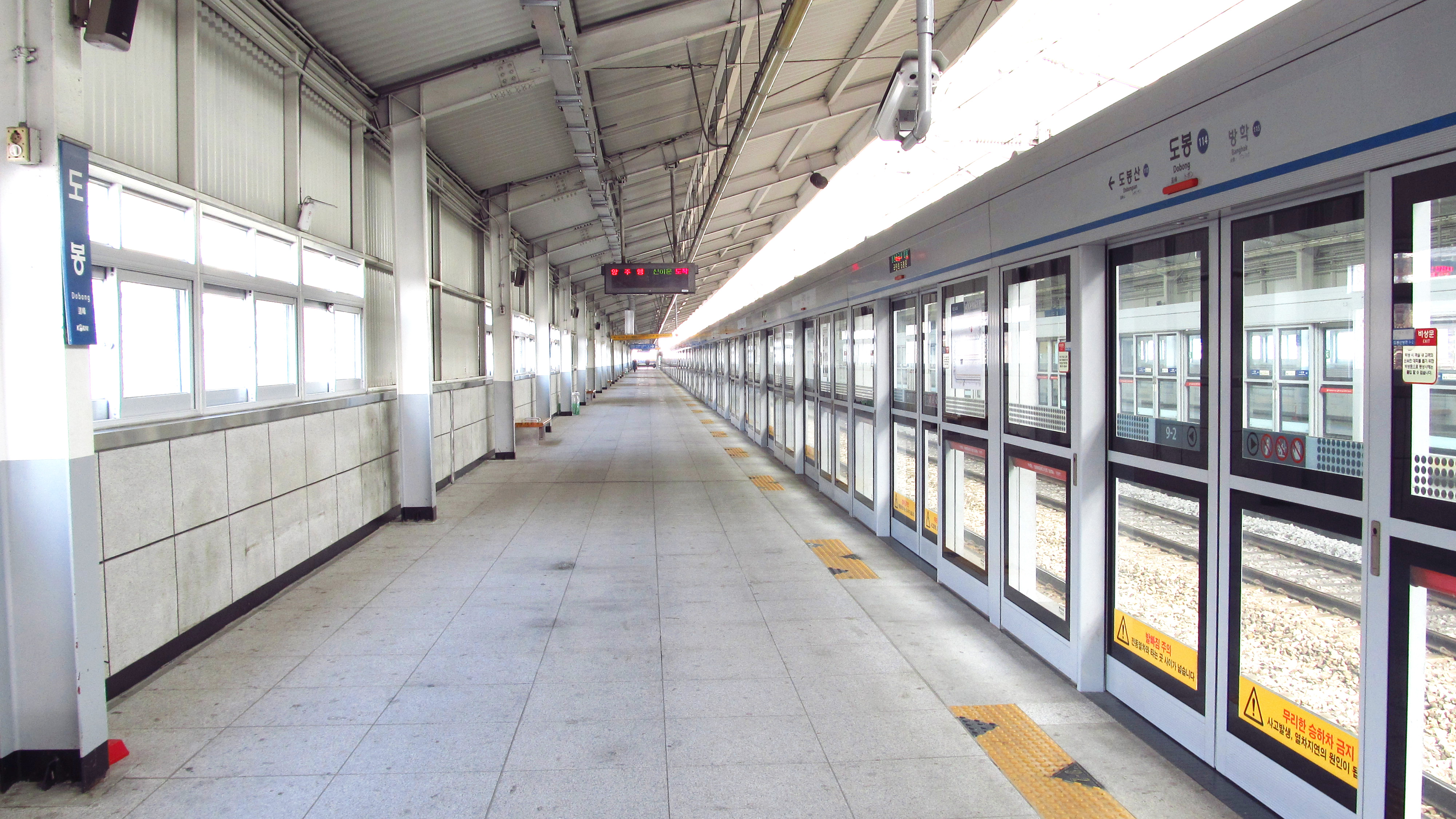

Korean name
- Hangul: 도봉역
- Hanja: 道峰驛
- Revised Romanization: Dobongyeok
- McCune–Reischauer: Tobongyŏk

General information
- Location: 2 Dobong-ro 170-gil, 89-159 Dobong 2-dong Dobong-gu, Seoul; South Korea
- Coordinates: 37°40′45″N 127°02′43″E
- Operator: Korail
- Line: Gyeongwon Line
- Platforms: 2
- Tracks: 2

Construction
- Structure type: Aboveground

History
- Opened: September 2, 1986

Passengers
- Based on Jan-Dec of 2012. Line 1: 13,247

Services
Preceding station	Seoul Metropolitan Subway	Following station
Dobongsan towards Yeoncheon	Line 1	Banghak towards Incheon
Location

Dobong Station is a metro station on Seoul Subway Line 1. It is in the extreme north of Seoul and offers services connecting the city to the cities to the north in Gyeonggi Province.

== Exits ==
- Exit 1: Dobong 1-dong Office, Dobong 1-dong Post Office, Bukseoul Middle School, Suraksan, Gangbuk·Dobong Red Cross Service Center
- Exit 2: Chang-dong Armed Forces Hospital
- Exit 3: Dobong 1-dong Community Center, Dobong Market
