= Gunpo station =

Train station in South Korea

군포 (지샘병원); Gunpo (Gsam Hospital)
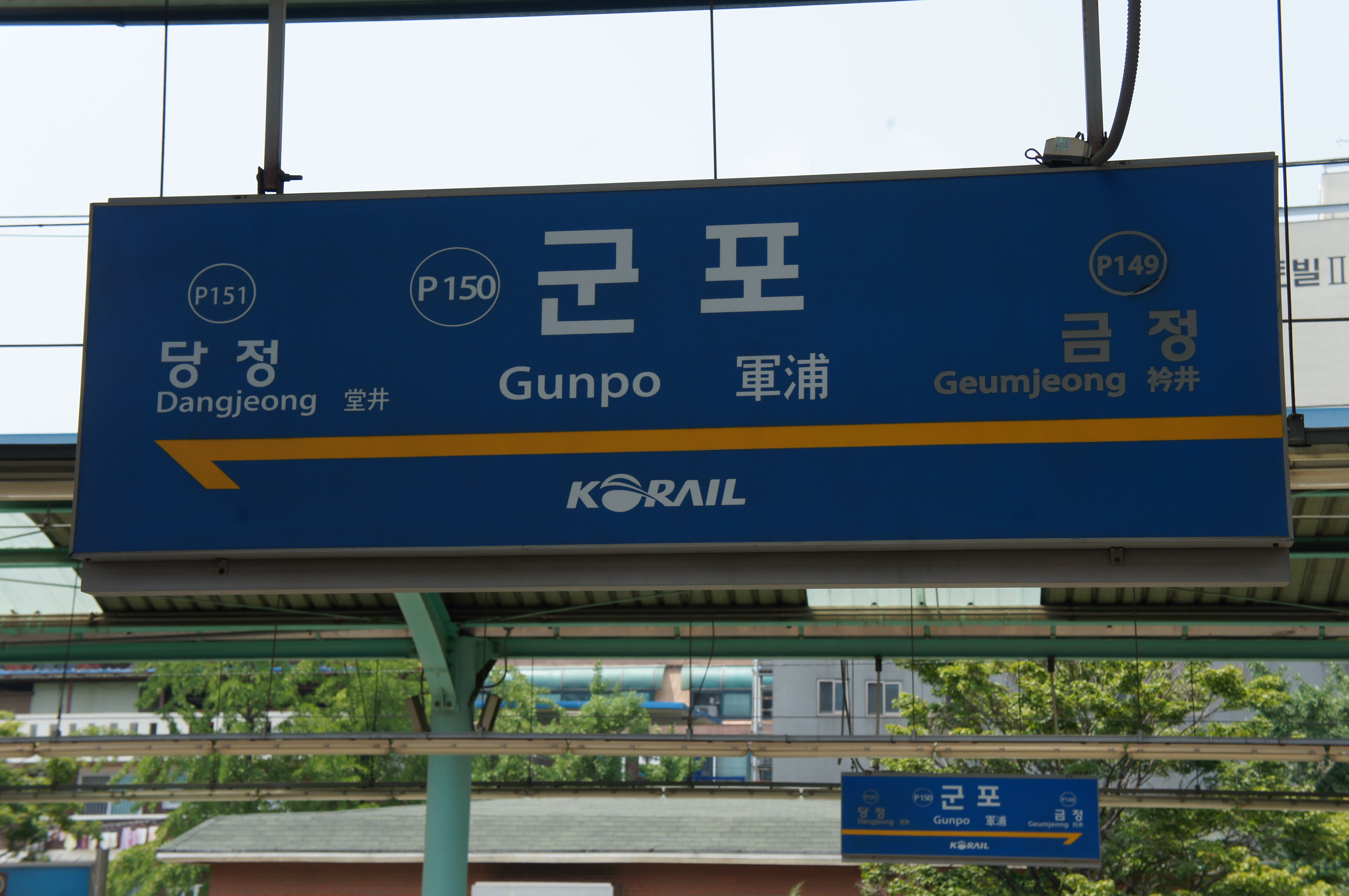

Korean name
- Hangul: 군포역
- Hanja: 軍浦驛
- RR: Gunpo-yeok
- MR: Kunp'o-yŏk

General information
- Location: 35 Gunpo-yeok 1-gil, Gunpo-si, Gyeonggi Province
- Coordinates: 37°21′13″N 126°56′55″E
- Operator: Korail
- Line: Line 1
- Platforms: 2
- Tracks: 4

Construction
- Structure type: Aboveground

History
- Opened: January 1, 1905

Key dates
- August 15, 1974: Line 1 opened

Passengers
- (Daily) Based on Jan-Dec of 2012. Line 1: 14,328
Location

Gunpo Station is a station on the Seoul Subway Line 1. It serves the city of Gunpo in Gyeonggi Province, South Korea. The name of the station is derived from the local name.

Preceding station	Seoul Metropolitan Subway	Following station
Geumjeong towards Kwangwoon University	Line 1	Dangjeong towards Seodongtan or Sinchang
Anyang towards Seoul	Line 1 Gyeongbu Express	Uiwang towards Sinchang
