= Nokcheon station =

Train station in Seoul, South Korea

녹천; Nokcheon
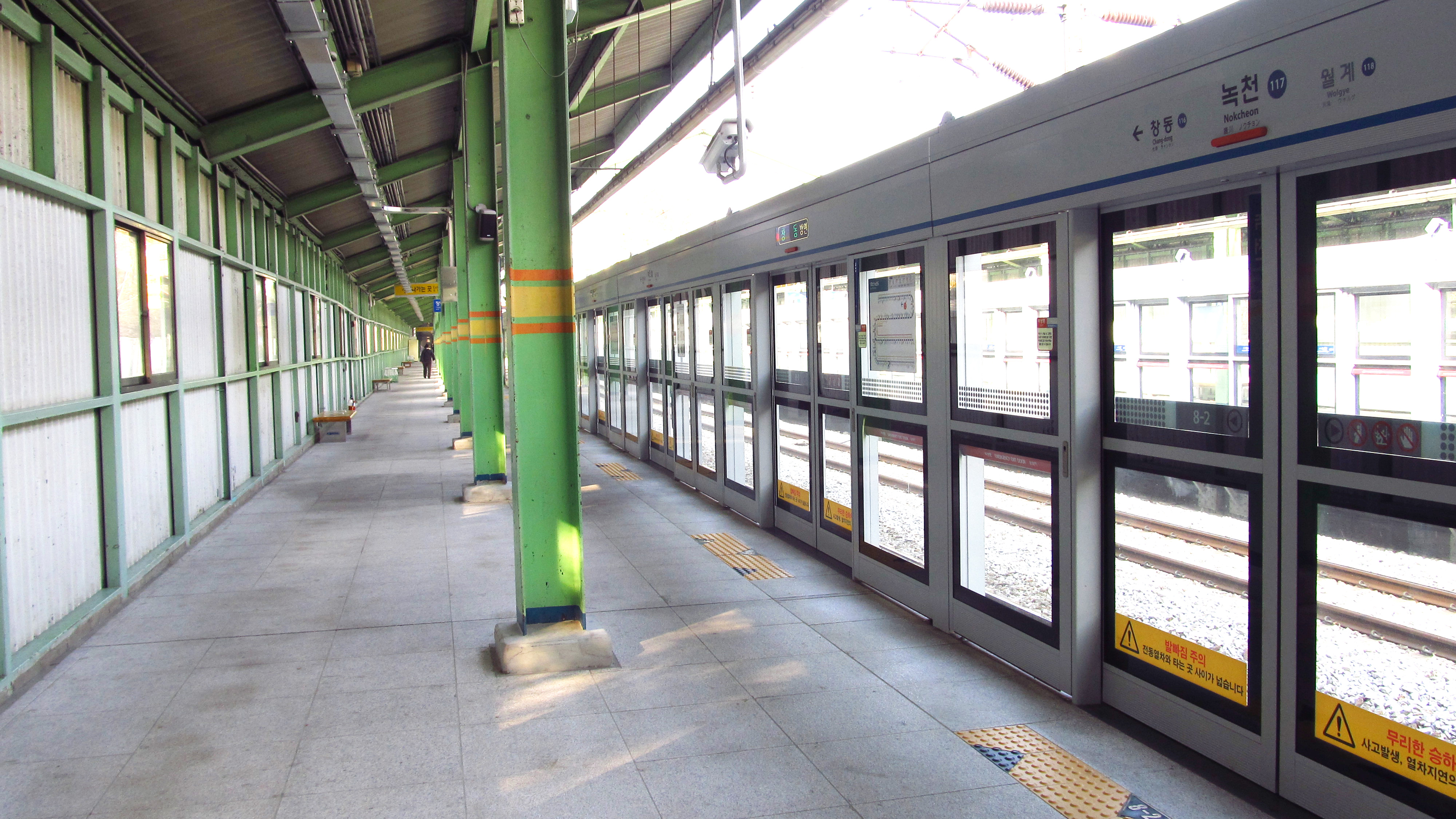

Korean name
- Hangul: 녹천역
- Hanja: 鹿川驛
- Revised Romanization: Nokcheon-yeok
- McCune–Reischauer: Nokch'ŏn-yŏk

General information
- Location: 114 Madeul-ro 5-gil, Dobong-gu, Seoul; South Korea
- Coordinates: 37°38′41″N 127°03′03″E
- Operator: Korail
- Line: Gyeongwon Line
- Platforms: 2
- Tracks: 2

Construction
- Structure type: Aboveground

History
- Opened: August 22, 1985

Passengers
- Based on Jan-Dec of 2012. Line 1: 10,174

Services
Preceding station	Seoul Metropolitan Subway	Following station
Chang-dong towards Yeoncheon	Line 1	Wolgye towards Incheon
Location

Nokcheon station (Korean: 녹천역) is a metro station on Seoul Subway Line 1 in South Korea. It is located in the northern end of the city.

== Exits ==
- Exit 1: Samsung Apartment House, Chang 1-dong Community Center, Chang 1-dong Protection Center, Changil Middle School, Seoul Changil Elementary School, Sinchang Market
- Exit 2: Nowon Middle School, Seoul Foreign Language High School, Seoul Wolcheon Elementary School, Sangchon Elementary School, Danghyeon Elementary School, Chang-dong Jugong 18 Complex, Chang-dong Jugon 19 Complex, Chang 4-dong Community Center
- Exit 3: Seoul Foreign Language High School, Eungok Technical High School, Seoul Jungwon Elementary School, Korea Gas Corporation, Chang-dong Jugong 17 Complex, Junggye Deungnamu Geullin Park
- Exit 4: Nokcheon Village
