= Jinwi station =

Train station in South Korea

Coordinates: 37°6′33.99″N 127°3′44.1″E

진위; Jinwi
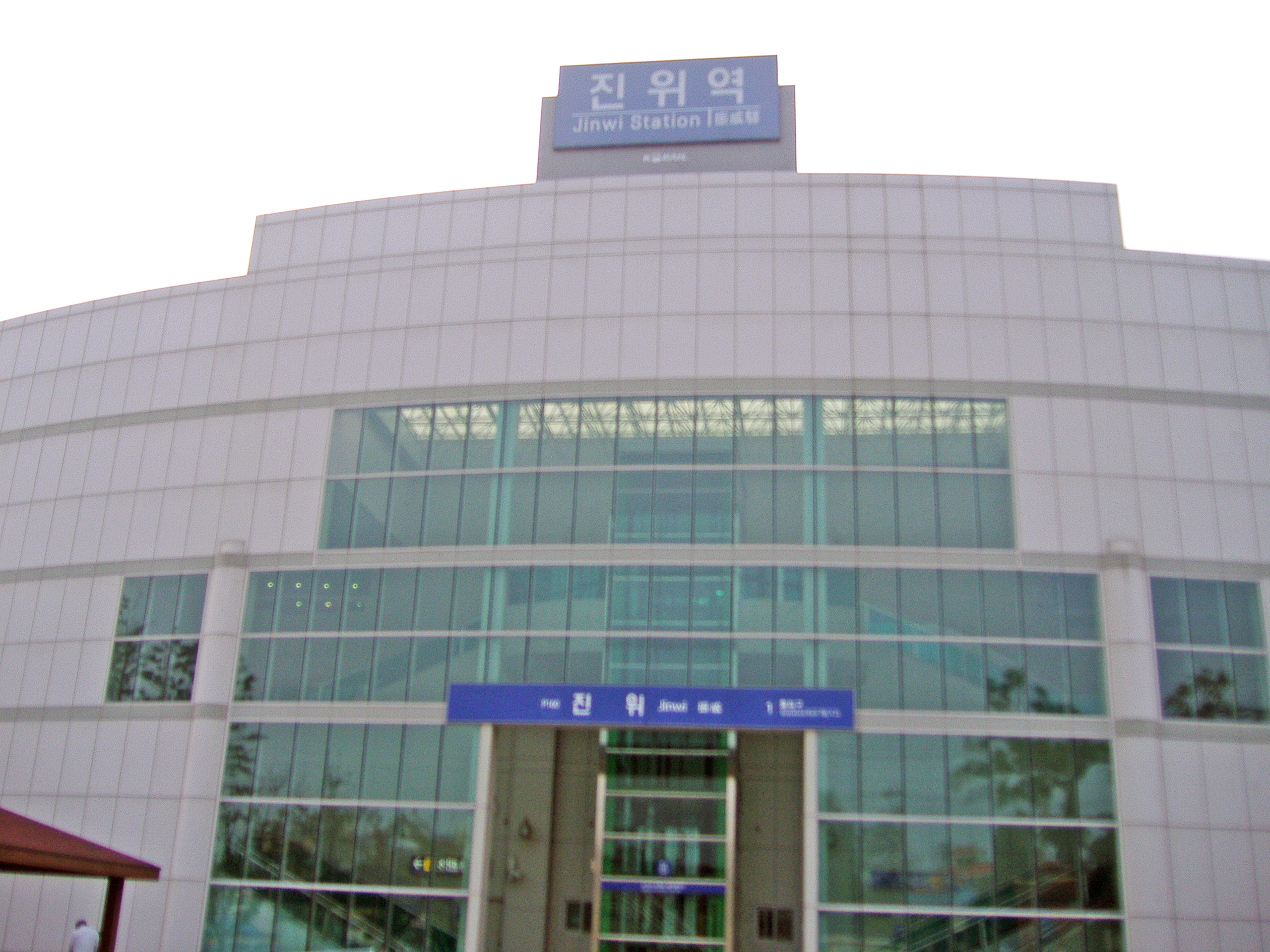

Korean name
- Hangul: 진위역
- Hanja: 振威驛
- RR: Jinwi-yeok
- MR: Chinwi-yŏk

General information
- Location: 139-3 Habungni, 1855; Gyeonggidaero, Jinwi-myeon, Pyeongtaek-si, Gyeonggi Province
- Operator: Korail
- Line: Line 1
- Platforms: 2
- Tracks: 2

Construction
- Structure type: Aboveground

Key dates
- June 30, 2006: Line 1 opened

Passengers
- (Daily) Based on Jan–Dec of 2012. Line 1: 2,827
Location

Jinwi Station is a station on Seoul Subway Line 1 in the city of Pyeongtaek, South Korea. Services on the Gyeongbu Line also pass through at this station.

During the planning stage it was going to be called Habuk Station (하북역), but at the request of the residents at Jinwi-myeon, the city government renamed it to Jinwi Station.

Preceding station	Seoul Metropolitan Subway	Following station
Osan towards Kwangwoon University	Line 1	Songtan towards Sinchang
