= Banghak station =

Station of the Seoul Metropolitan Subway

방학 (도봉구청); Banghak (Dobong-gu Office)
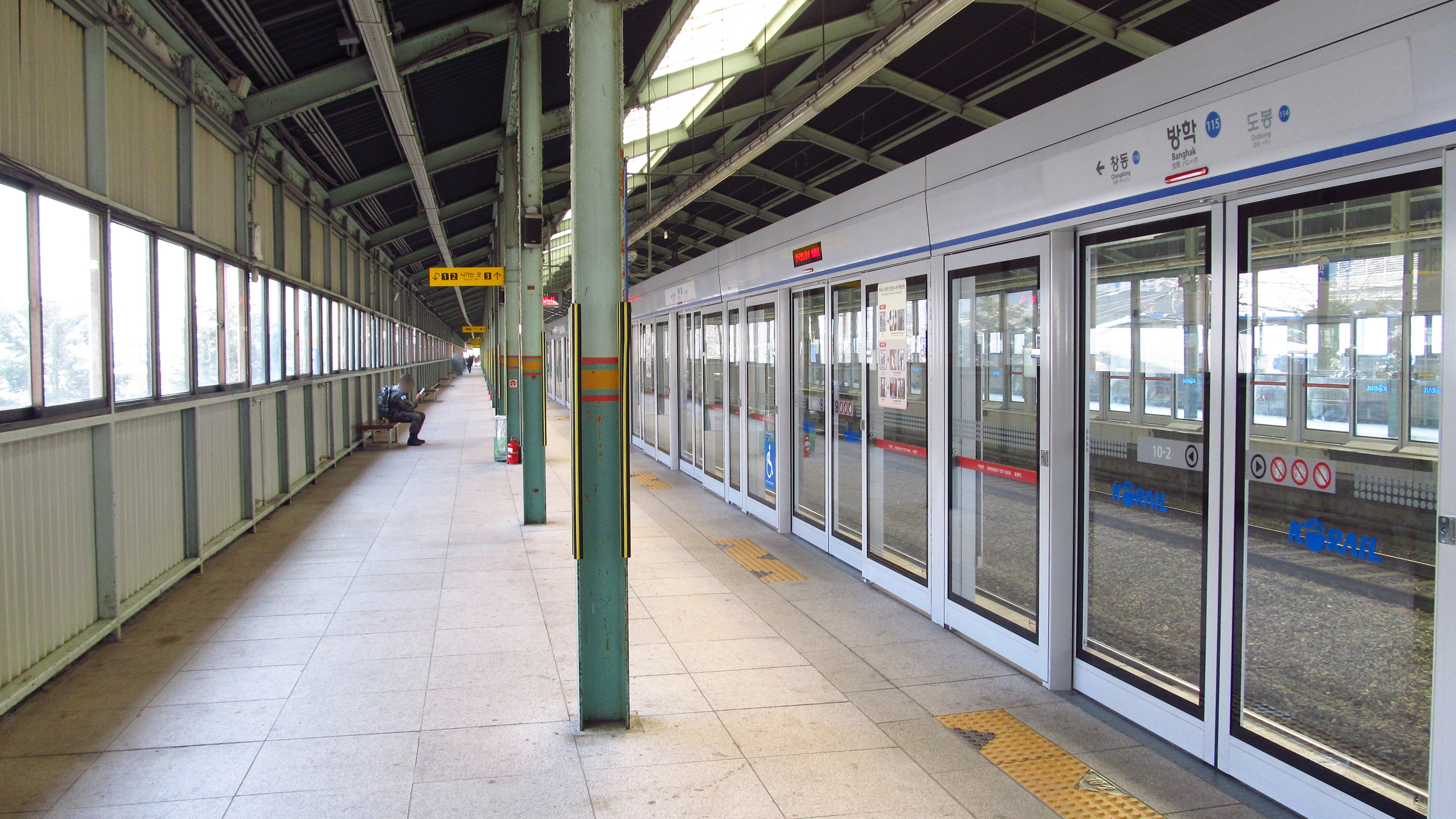
- Station Platform

Korean name
- Hangul: 방학역
- Hanja: 放鶴驛
- Revised Romanization: Banghak-yeok
- McCune–Reischauer: Panghak-yŏk

General information
- Location: 728 Banghak 1-dong, 3 Dobong-no 150-da-gil, Dobong-gu, Seoul; South Korea
- Coordinates: 37°40′02″N 127°02′39″E
- Operator: Korail
- Line: Gyeongwon Line
- Platforms: 2
- Tracks: 2

Construction
- Structure type: Aboveground

History
- Opened: September 2, 1986

Passengers
- Based on Jan-Dec of 2012. Line 1: 19,891

Services
Preceding station	Seoul Metropolitan Subway	Following station
Dobong towards Yeoncheon	Line 1	Chang-dong towards Incheon
Location

Banghak station (Korean: 방학; Hanja: 放鶴) is a subway station on Line 1 of the Seoul Metropolitan Subway. It is the closest station to the Dobong District Office in Seoul.

== Exit ==
- Exit 1: Dobong Fire Station, Banghak 1-dong Community Center, Banghak 1-dong Protection Center, Banghak Post Office, Obong Elementary School, Sindobong Market
- Exit 2: Dobong 2-dong Community Center, Dobong-gu Office, Dobong Middle School, Dobong 2-dong Protection Center, Lotte Mart
- Exit 3: Dobong 2-dong Community Center, Dobong Fire Station, Dobong Information Industrial High School, Banghak 1-dong Community Center, Banghak 1-dong Protection Center, Banghak Post Office, Seoul Changdo Elementary School, Changdong Middle School, Changdong High School
