= Songtan station =

Station of the Seoul Metropolitan Subway

Coordinates: 37°04′31″N 127°03′15″E

송탄; Songtan

Korean name
- Hangul: 송탄역
- Hanja: 松炭驛
- RR: Songtan-yeok
- MR: Songt'an-yŏk

General information
- Location: 284-5 Sinjang-dong, 43 Songtangongwonno, Pyeongtaek-si, Gyeonggi-do
- Operator: Korail
- Line: Line 1
- Platforms: 2
- Tracks: 3

Construction
- Structure type: Aboveground

History
- Opened: October 1, 1952

Key dates
- 20 January 2005: Line 1 opened

Passengers
- (Daily) Based on Jan-Dec of 2012. Line 1: 8,846
Location

Songtan station is a ground level metro station in Songtan, a district of Pyeongtaek in Gyeonggi Province, South Korea. The station is on Line 1 of the Seoul Metropolitan Subway, which runs from Soyosan in Dongducheon to Cheonan in Chungcheongnam-do. The line also serves Osan, Suwon, and Seoul.

Unlike most pre-existing stations on Line 1 which opened with the collocated Gyeongbu Line in 1905, Songtan station was built during the Korean War in 1952 to handle track switching for branch lines leading to the nearby newly built Osan Air Base. After the war, the Bidulgi class of commuter trains began to call on Songtan station, but these were phased out in the 1990s.

In 2005, Line 1 was extended south of Suwon and the current station building was opened to service the new line. In 2010, a taxi stand was constructed to facilitate drop-off and pick-up of passengers right outside the concourse entrance.

The station is close to Osan Air Base and the western-style shopping district commonly called "Main Gate". Visitors can exit the subway station and take a taxi to "Main Gate" and be there in a few minutes. Located next to Songtan station is Tae-kwan Middle School and High School.

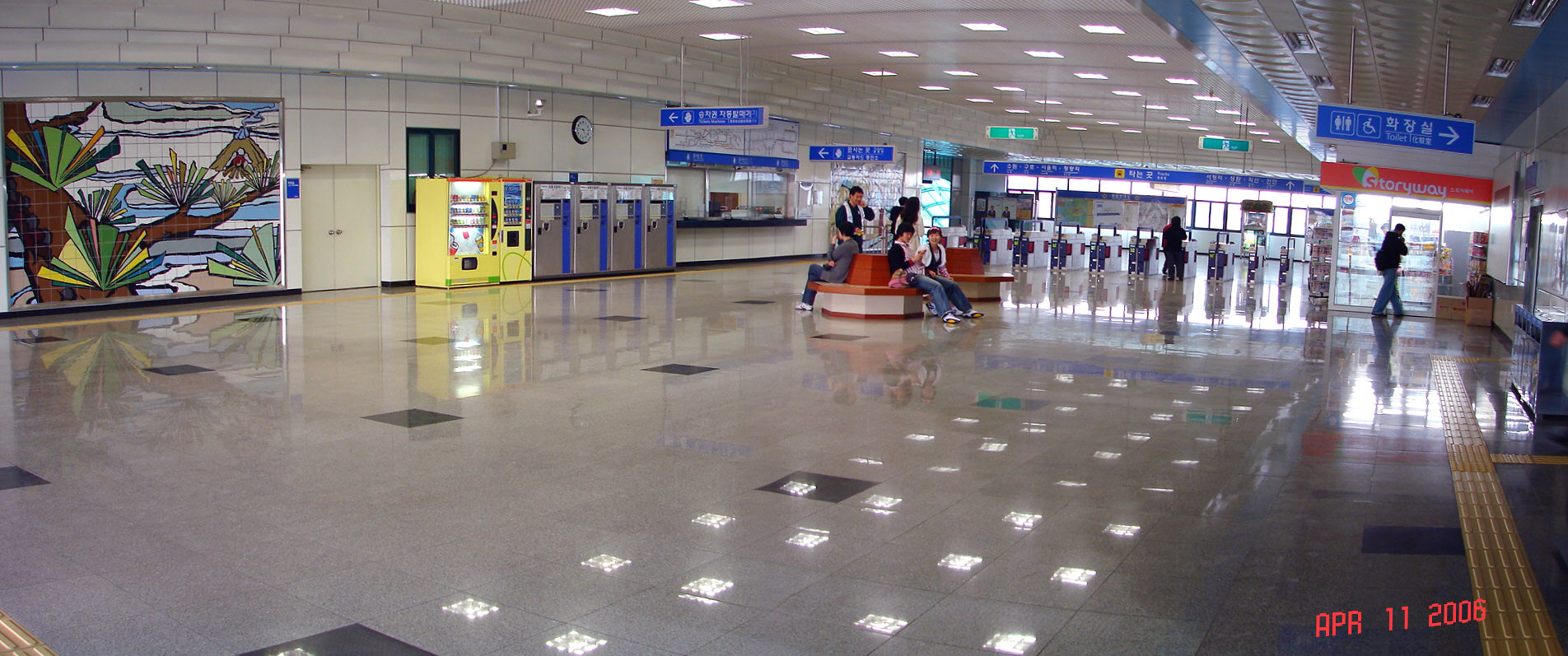
Concourse

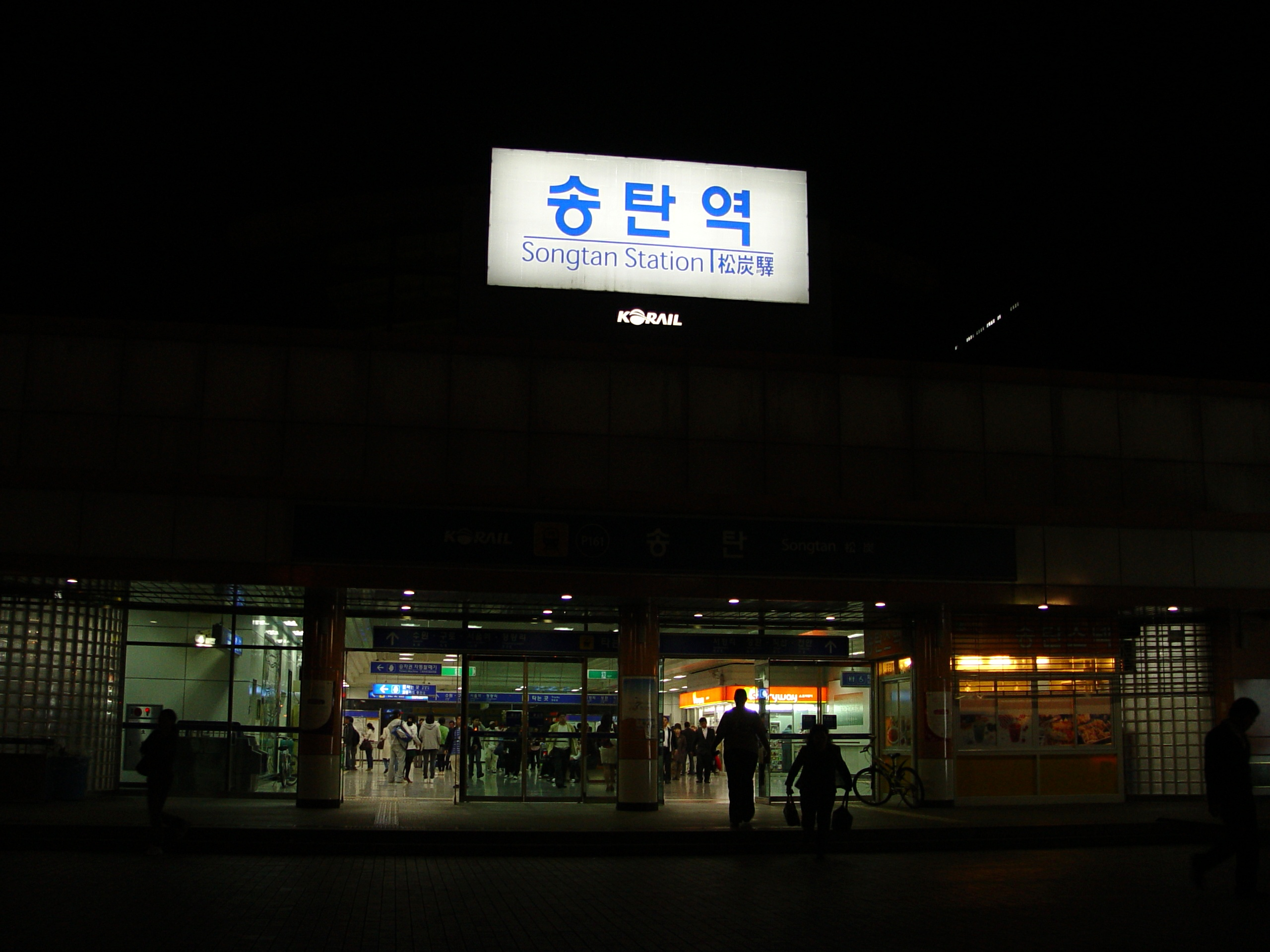
Station sign at night

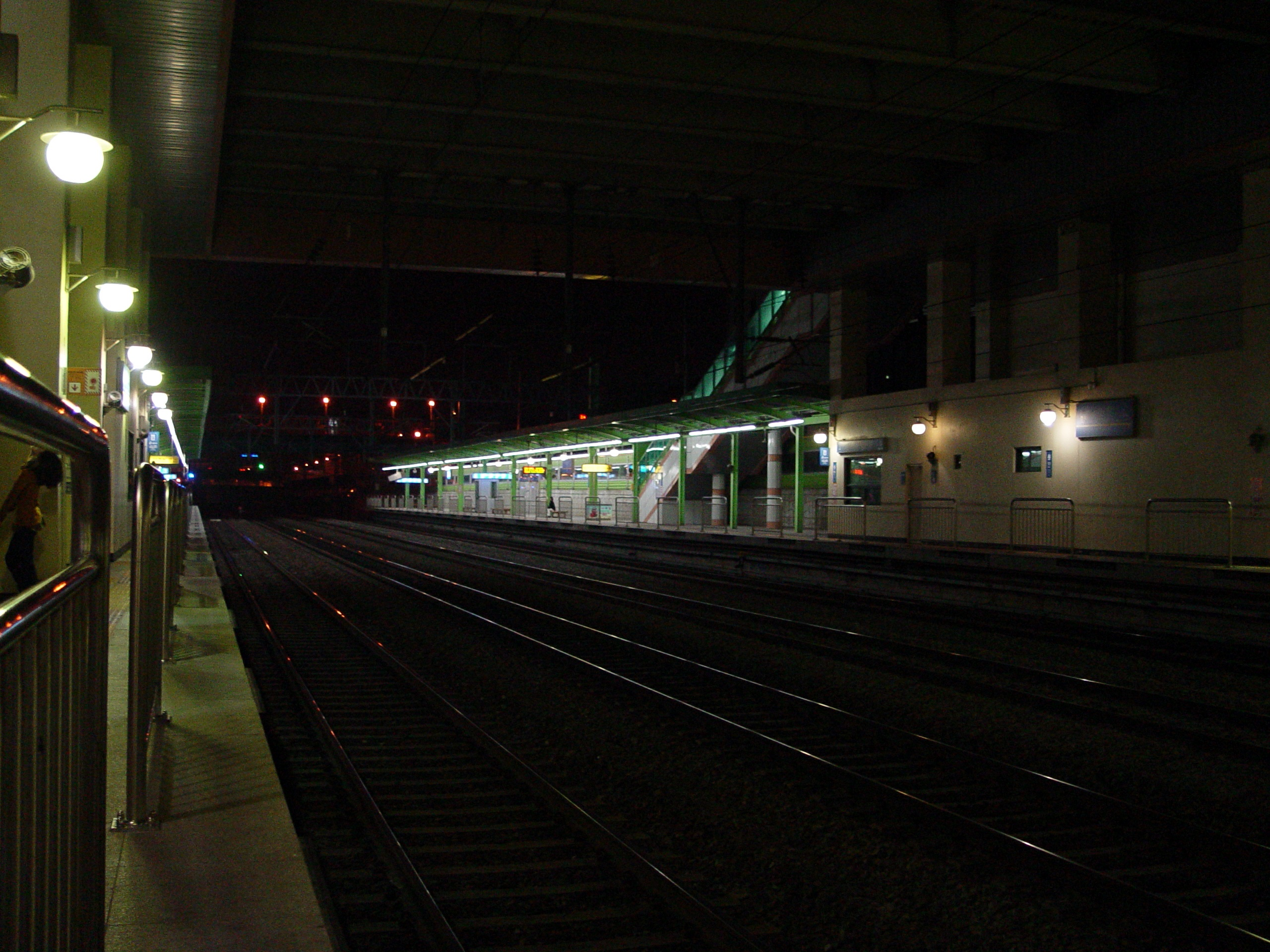
Platforms at night

Preceding station	Seoul Metropolitan Subway	Following station
Jinwi towards Kwangwoon University	Line 1	Seojeong-ri towards Sinchang
