= Sema station =

Metro station in Osan, South Korea

Coordinates: 37°11′15″N 127°02′36″E

세마; Sema
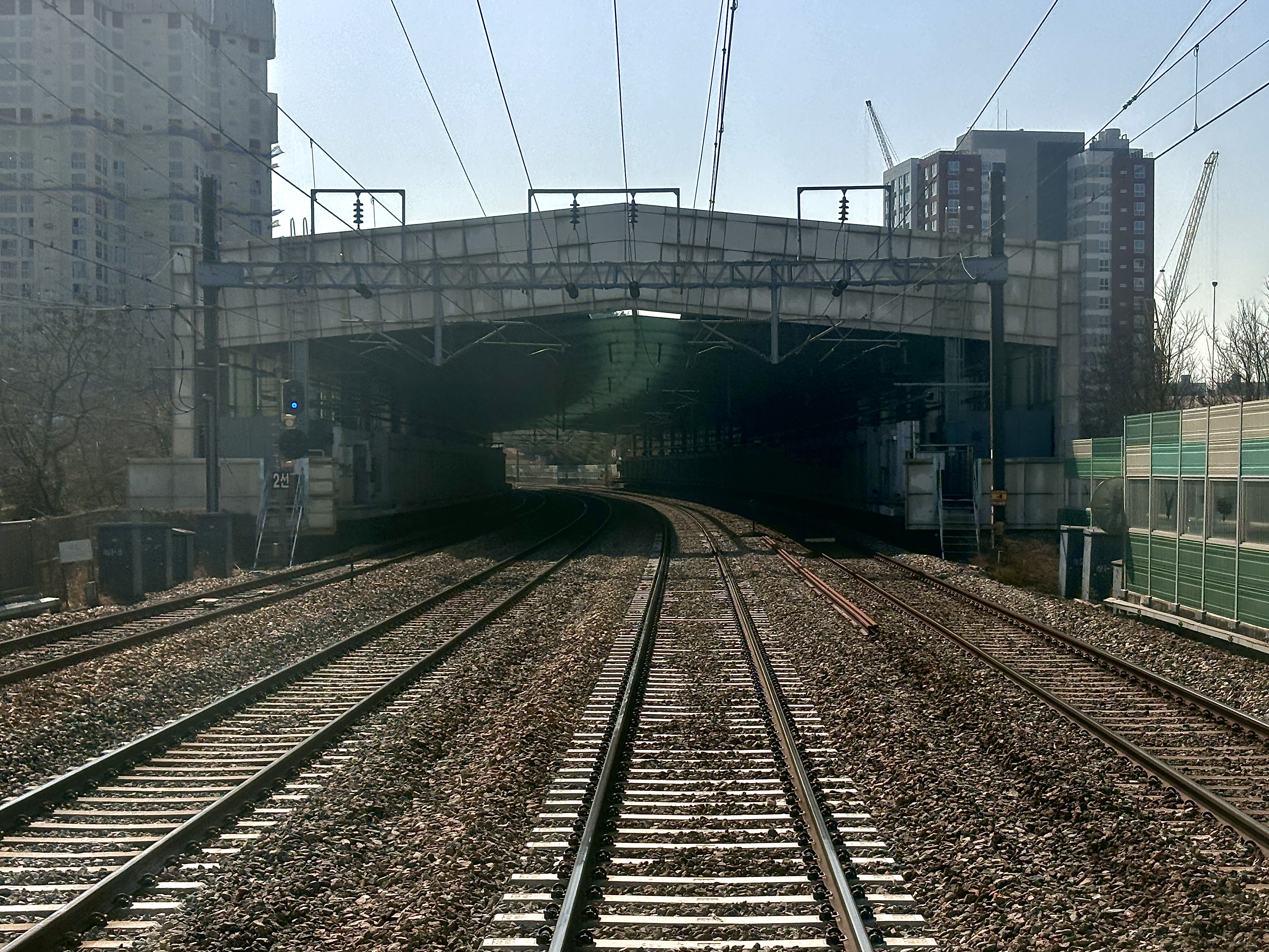

Korean name
- Hangul: 세마역
- Hanja: 洗馬驛
- RR: Sema-yeok
- MR: Sema-yŏk

General information
- Location: 225 Sema-dong, 88 Semayeongno, Osan-si, Gyeonggi-do
- Operator: Korail
- Line: Line 1
- Platforms: 2
- Tracks: 2

Construction
- Structure type: Aboveground

Key dates
- December 27, 2005: Line 1 opened

Passengers
- (Daily) Based on Jan-Dec of 2012. Line 1: 4,324
Location

Sema station is a station on Seoul Subway Line 1 in the city of Osan, South Korea. Services on the Gyeongbu Line also pass through this station.

== History ==
In September 1997 the station was planned to be built with Korail and the city government of Osan sharing 50-50 of the construction cost, but in 1999 Korail decided to cancel the project due to budget constraints, causing residents and students from nearby universities, such as Hanshin University, to protest. After evaluating it to be economically feasible, construction resumed. It was originally scheduled to open in 2002, but conflict over project costs and land ownership further delayed its date. Finally in 2005 it began operations.

Preceding station	Seoul Metropolitan Subway	Following station
Byeongjeom towards Kwangwoon University	Line 1	Osan College towards Sinchang
