= Osan University station =

Metro station in Osan, South Korea

Coordinates: 37°10′10″N 127°03′47″E

오산대; Osan College
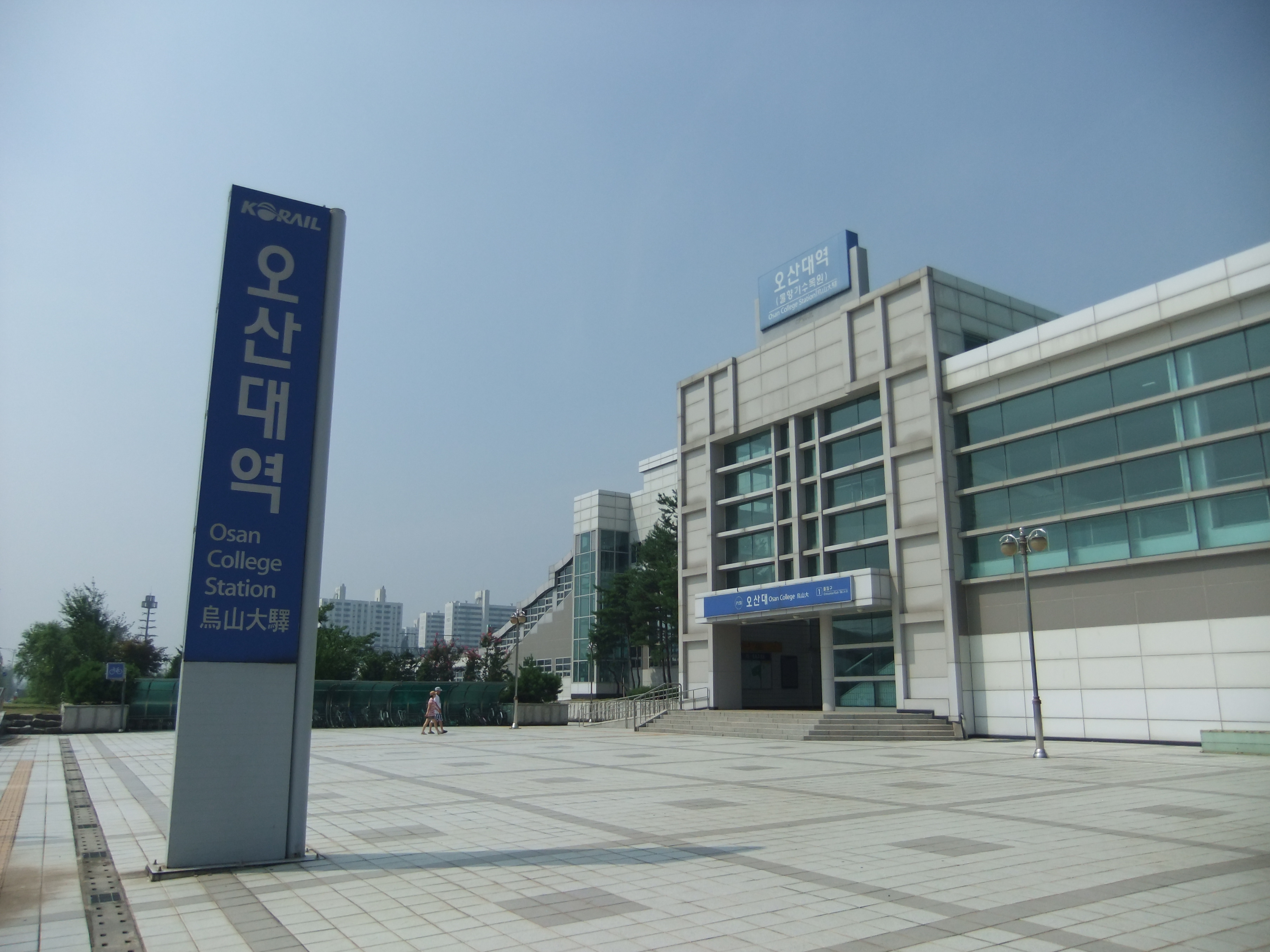

Korean name
- Hangul: 오산대역
- Hanja: 烏山大驛
- Revised Romanization: Osandae-yeok
- McCune–Reischauer: Osandae-yŏk

General information
- Location: 157 Sucheong-dong, 236 Cheonghangno, Osan-si, Gyeonggi-do
- Operator: Korail
- Line: Line 1
- Platforms: 2
- Tracks: 4

Construction
- Structure type: Aboveground

Key dates
- December 27, 2005: Line 1 opened

Passengers
- (Daily) Based on Jan-Dec of 2012. Line 1: 3,435
Location

Osan College station is a station on Seoul Subway Line 1. Osan University, despite the name of the station, is about a mile away from this station, and is closer to the next station on Line 1, Osan station.

== Arboretum ==
The Mulhyanggi Arboretum is within 5 minutes' walking distance. In Korean, mul means 'water' and hyanggi means fragrance. Operated by Gyeonggi Province and opened in May, 2006, the gardens feature 1,600 species.

Preceding station	Seoul Metropolitan Subway	Following station
Sema towards Kwangwoon University	Line 1	Osan towards Sinchang
