= Seoul Subway Line 1 =

Subway line in South Korea

Line 1
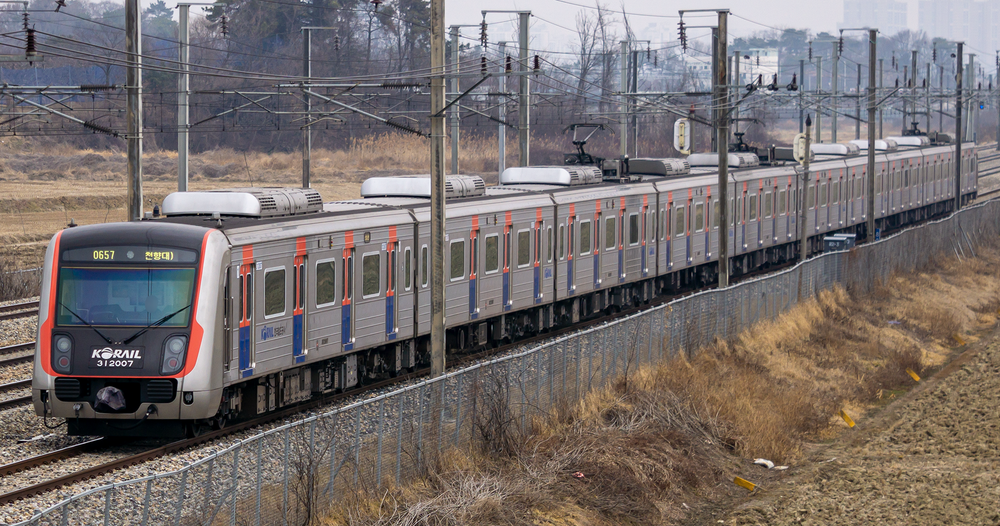
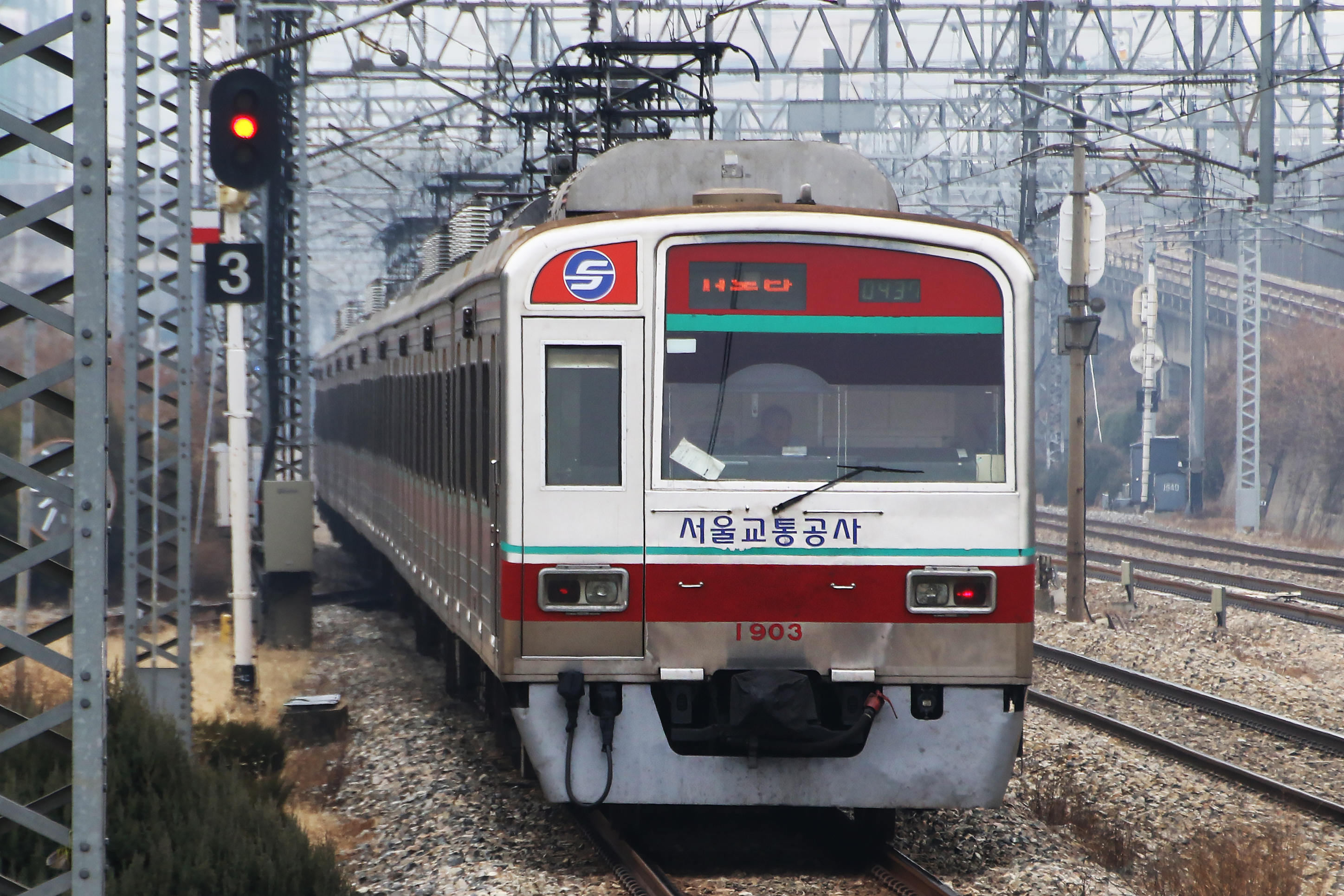
- Korail Class 311000 series EMU in February 2021 (top); Seoul Metro 1000 series EMU in December 2017 (bottom)

Overview
- Native name: 1호선(一號線) il Hoseon
- Status: Operational
- Owner: Seoul Special City, South Korean Government
- Line number: 1
- Locale: Seoul Metropolitan Area
- Termini: Yeoncheon; Incheon / Sinchang / Gwangmyeong / Seodongtan
- Stations: 102; Seoul Metro: 10; Korail: 92

Service
- Type: Rapid transit / Commuter Rail
- System: Seoul Metropolitan Subway
- Services: Local: Yeoncheon / Soyosan / Dongducheon ↔ Incheon, Kwangwoon U ↔ Seodongtan / Cheonan / Sinchang, Yeongdeungpo ↔ Gwangmyeong; Express: Cheongnyangni ↔ Cheonan / Sinchang, Dongducheon ↔ Incheon (AM Rush & off-peak weekdays), Yongsan ↔ Dongincheon, Seoul Station ↔ Cheonan/Sinchang (weekday RH, peak direction only)
- Operator(s): Seoul Metro, Korail
- Daily ridership: 405,564 (2024)
- Ridership: 148.44 million (2024) (▲2.6%)

History
- Opened: August 15, 1974; 52 years ago
- Last extension: 2023

Technical
- Line length: 218.3 km (135.6 mi); Seoul Metro: 7.8 km (4.8 mi); Korail: 210.5 km (130.8 mi)
- Track gauge: 1,435 mm (4 ft 8 1/2 in) standard gauge
- Electrification: 1,500 V DC (Seoul Metro section); 25 kV AC at 60 Hz (Korail section)
- Operating speed: 110 km/h (68 mph)

Seoul Subway Line 1 from above, 2019

Seoul Subway Line 1 (dubbed The Dark Blue Line) of the Seoul Metropolitan Subway is a rapid transit and commuter rail line which links central Seoul, South Korea to Yeoncheon in the northeast, Incheon in the southwest, and Sinchang via Suwon and Cheonan in the south. The central underground portion of Line 1, running underneath Sejongno, Jongno, and Wangsan-ro avenues along Seoul's traditional downtown area, is the oldest subway-operated section in the Seoul Metropolitan Subway system. Its branches and services cover a large part of the Seoul Metropolitan Area; totaling 218.3 km (135.6 mi) in route length. In its above-ground stations, Line 1's station signs are a lighter blue and hang from the roof, but it uses dark blue, oblong signs with rounded ends (like lines 2 and 3 except with a different colour) in the underground stations.

The underground section between Seoul station and Cheongnyangni station, which is referred to as Seoul Metro Line 1 (7.8 km [4.8 mi]) after its operator, is currently operated by Seoul Metro, and is electrified at the subway standard of 1.5 kV DC. The line first opened in 1974 as the Korean National Railroad of Seoul with through services to newly-electrified (at the mainline KNR standard of 25 kV AC 60 Hz) national mainline railways from Seongbuk station (now: Kwangwoon University station) to Incheon and Suwon stations. This was the first electrified rapid transit line and service in South Korea and the second in the Korean Peninsula after the Pyongyang Metro in North Korea opened the year before.

Frequent service is provided between Soyosan, Dongducheon, Uijeongbu, Cheongnyangni, Seoul, Yongsan, and Guro, where trains split between Incheon in the west and Byeongjeom and Cheonan in the south. Express trains operate from Yongsan and Seoul stations to Dongincheon and Sinchang stations. Trains run every 3-6 min in the central route between Seoul Station and Cheongnyangni, every 6-9 min between Seoul and Guro, every 8-10 min between Guro and Incheon and between Guro and Byeongjeom, every 10-15 min from Byeongjeom to Cheonan, and every 35 min between Cheonan and Sinchang and service up to the Dongducheon area and Soyosan station.

Service to Yeoncheon is approximately once per hour, limited due to the single track section approaching Soyosan station. This service is meant to be the replacement for the Gyeongwon line commuter trains, which began at Dongducheon station prior to its closure.

Trains travel along Gyeongbu (Seoul-Cheonan), Gyeongin (Guro-Incheon), Janghang (Cheonan-Sinchang), and Gyeongwon (Hoegi-Yeoncheon) railway lines. The line runs on the left-hand side of the track, as opposed to the right-hand side of the track like all other Seoul Metropolitan Subway lines (another exception to this is Seoul Subway Line 4 although it runs on the right-hand side until Namtaeryeong station, and operates on the left-hand side for the parts afterwards) since railways in Korea generally run on the left side.

== Rapid (Express) trains ==
Korail operates a variety of express "rapid" (Korean: 급행 geup-haeng, Hanja: 急行) trains for long distance commuter services on Line 1. These services include:

- Gyeongin line express services from Yongsan to Dongincheon, operating express between Guro and Dongincheon, introduced on January 29, 1999, following quadruple-tracking of the Gyeongin Line.
- Gyeongbu line "A" express services from Cheongnyangni to Cheonan or Sinchang, operating express between Gasan Digital Complex and Cheonan and running local elsewhere.
- Gyeongbu line "B" express service from Seoul Station to Cheonan or Sinchang, originating at a platform adjacent to Seoul Station, skipping all stations between Seoul station and Geumcheon-gu Office station, making intermediate stops at Anyang, Gunpo, Uiwang, and Sungkyunkwan University, and then following the Gyeongbu line "A" express service pattern south of Suwon. Northbound services (departing from Cheonan/Sinchang and terminating at Seoul Station) stop at Yeongdeungpo station, but southbound services are unable to due to the lack of a raised platform. This service was introduced on September 25, 1982.
- Gyeongwon line express services from Dongducheon to Incheon, operating express between Dongducheon and Kwangwoon University and running local between Incheon and Kwangwoon University.

Former express services include:

- One late night Gyeongin line express service that originated at Soyosan, made all stops to Guro, then made express stops until Incheon.
- Yeongdeungpo-Byeongjeom Gyeongbu line express service, skipping all stations between Yeongdeungpo and Anyang and then following the Yeongsan-Cheonan/Sinchang express service pattern south of Anyang until Byeongjeom. This service was introduced on August 25, 2014 and was discontinued on December 9, 2016.
- Two faster Yongsan-Sinchang limited express trains (one in each direction), introduced in 2013. This train only operated on weekends and holidays. It was discontinued on July 1, 2018.
- Faster Yongsan-Dongincheon limited express (Korean: 특급 teuk-geup, Hanja: 特急) trains, introduced on July 7, 2017. These were discontinued on May 26, 2026.

== Electrification ==
Seoul Subway Line 1 is powered by 1500 V direct current on the underground tunnel segment between Cheongnyangni station and Seoul station, and by 25000 V alternating current (60 Hertz frequency) on the rest of the line. Underground DC system was implemented in order to prevent possible telecommunication malfunction by AC current on telephone lines, following the opposition from the Ministry of Postal Service (currently Ministry of Science and ICT). Because of this different manner of offering electric current, there are neutral sections between Cheongnyangni station and Hoegi station, as well as between Seoul Station and Namyeong station. All Line 1 rolling stock are similarly required to be multi-system compatible with both electrification systems.

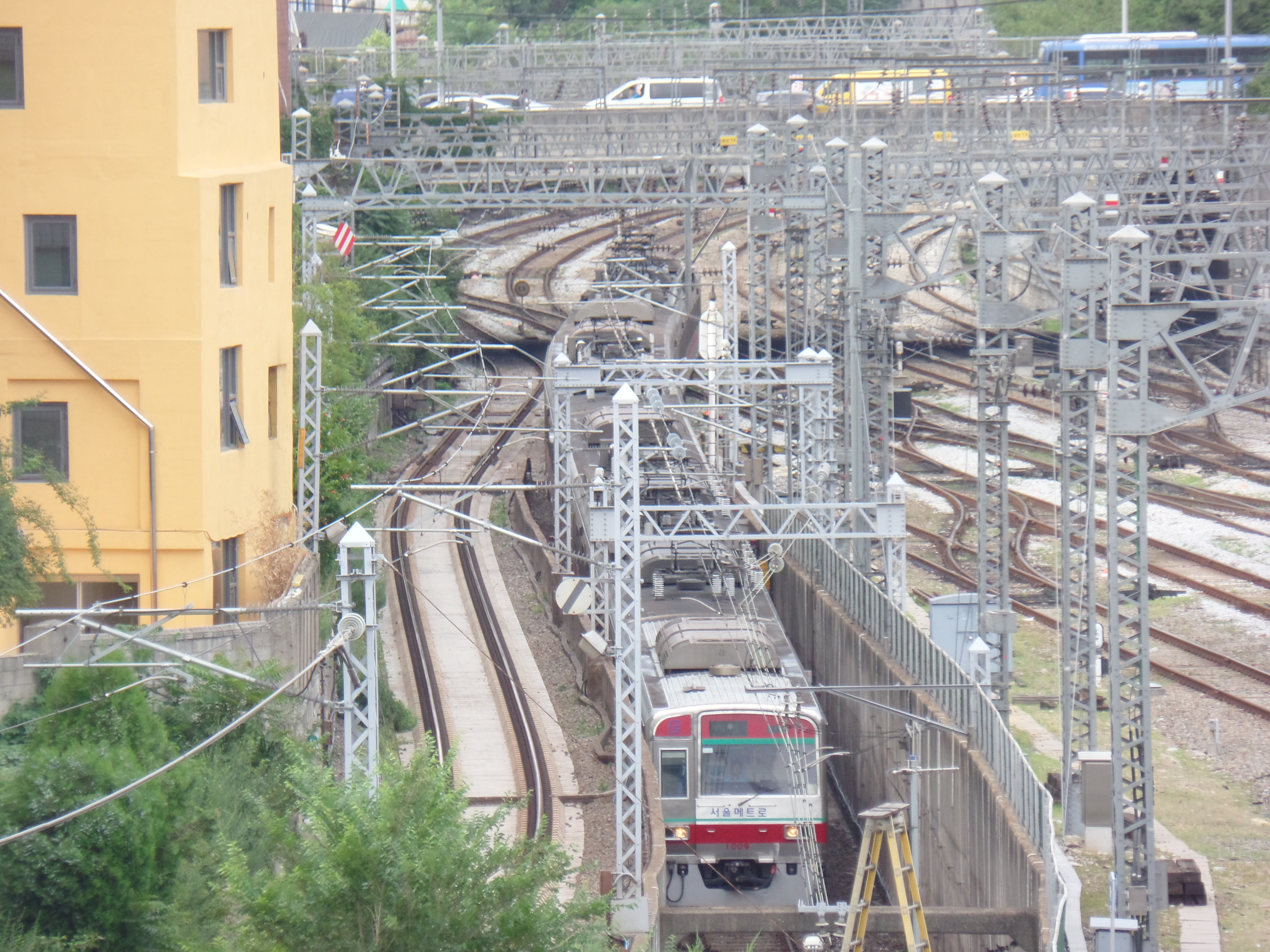
Cheongnyangni-Hoegi DC-AC neutral section

== Stations ==
Until 2000, the 7.8 km (4.8 mi) underground city-center portion run by Seoul Metro Corporation—one of Seoul Metro's predecessors—was the only section properly referred to as Line 1 and labeled red on maps. On the other hand, the remaining sections of the rail line run by Korail were referred to as Korean National Railroad of Seoul and the local all-stop services labeled either blue or gray on maps, while the express services were labelled thin red. Since 2000, all adjacent through-running Korail services from the Gyeongbu, Gyeongin and Gyeongwon Lines, as well as later Korail-operated extensions and branches, are officially bundled together with the aforementioned underground portion as part of a greater Line 1, and the labeling on maps was changed and standardized to the current dark blue color (as illustrated in the map below); also to avoid confusion with Line 4's light blue color. (A slightly different shade of red is now used to label the Shinbundang Line which opened in 2011.)

=== Main Lines ===
Local lines:

- Yeoncheon, Soyosan, Dongducheon, Yangju, Uijeongbu, Dongmyo or Guro — Incheon
- Uijeongbu (3 times only on weekdays), Kwangwoon Univ., Cheongnyangni or Guro — Cheonan, Sinchang, or Seodongtan
- Yeongdeungpo — Gwangmyeong (shuttle)

Express lines:

- GW: Gyeongwon Express (Dongducheon - Incheon)
- GI: Gyeongin Express (Yongsan – Dongincheon)
- GB A: Gyeongbu Express (Cheongnyangni – Cheonan or Sinchang)
- GB B: Gyeongbu Express (Seoul – Cheonan or Sinchang)

※ Only Korail trains are used for express trains.
Key:

●	Stops at the station
｜	Does not stop at the station
○	Limited service

Station number	Station name English	Station name Hangul	GW	GI	GB A	GB B	Transfer	Line name	Distance in km	Total distance	Location	
100-3	Yeoncheon	연천	No service	No service	No service	No service		Gyeongwon Line		0.0	Gyeonggi-do	Yeoncheon-gun
100-2	Jeongok	전곡	No service	No service	No service	No service		Gyeongwon Line	8.7	8.7	Gyeonggi-do	Yeoncheon-gun
100-1	Cheongsan	청산	No service	No service	No service	No service		Gyeongwon Line	3.3	12.0	Gyeonggi-do	Dongducheon-si
100	Soyosan	소요산	No service	No service	No service	No service		Gyeongwon Line	5.8	17.8 0.0	Gyeonggi-do	Dongducheon-si
101	Dongducheon	동두천	●	No service	No service	No service		Gyeongwon Line	2.5	2.5	Gyeonggi-do	Dongducheon-si
102	Bosan	보산	｜	No service	No service	No service		Gyeongwon Line	1.6	4.1	Gyeonggi-do	Dongducheon-si
103	Dongducheon Jungang	동두천중앙	●	No service	No service	No service		Gyeongwon Line	1.4	5.5	Gyeonggi-do	Dongducheon-si
104	Jihaeng	지행	●	No service	No service	No service		Gyeongwon Line	1.0	6.5	Gyeonggi-do	Dongducheon-si
105	Deokjeong (Seojeong Univ.)	덕정 (서정대학교)	●	No service	No service	No service		Gyeongwon Line	5.6	12.1	Gyeonggi-do	Yangju-si
106	Deokgye	덕계	●	No service	No service	No service		Gyeongwon Line	2.9	15.0	Gyeonggi-do	Yangju-si
107	Yangju (Kyungdong Univ.)	양주 (경동대)	●	No service	No service	No service		Gyeongwon Line	5.3	20.3	Gyeonggi-do	Yangju-si
108	Nogyang	녹양	｜	No service	No service	No service		Gyeongwon Line	1.6	21.9	Gyeonggi-do	Uijeongbu-si
109	Ganeung (Eulji Univ. Medical Center)	가능 (을지대병원)	｜	No service	No service	No service		Gyeongwon Line	1.3	23.2	Gyeonggi-do	Uijeongbu-si
110	Uijeongbu	의정부	●	No service	No service	No service		Gyeongwon Line	1.2	24.4	Gyeonggi-do	Uijeongbu-si
111	Hoeryong	회룡	●	No service	No service	No service	U Line	Gyeongwon Line	1.6	26.0	Gyeonggi-do	Uijeongbu-si
112	Mangwolsa (Shinhan Univ. Campus Number 1)	망월사 (신한대 제1캠퍼스)	｜	No service	No service	No service		Gyeongwon Line	1.4	27.4	Gyeonggi-do	Uijeongbu-si
113	Dobongsan	도봉산	●	No service	No service	No service	Seoul Subway Line 7	Gyeongwon Line	2.3	29.7	Seoul	Dobong-gu
114	Dobong	도봉	｜	No service	No service	No service		Gyeongwon Line	1.2	30.9	Seoul	Dobong-gu
115	Banghak (Dobong-gu Office)	방학 (도봉구청)	｜	No service	No service	No service		Gyeongwon Line	1.3	32.2	Seoul	Dobong-gu
116	Chang-dong	창동	●	No service	No service	No service	Seoul Subway Line 4	Gyeongwon Line	1.7	33.9	Seoul	Dobong-gu
117	Nokcheon	녹천	｜	No service	No service	No service		Gyeongwon Line	1.0	34.9	Seoul	Dobong-gu
118	Wolgye (Induk Univ.)	월계 (인덕대학)	｜	No service	No service	No service		Gyeongwon Line	1.4	36.3	Seoul	Nowon-gu
119	Kwangwoon Univ.	광운대	●	No service	No service	No service	Gyeongchun Line	Gyeongwon Line	1.1	37.4	Seoul	Nowon-gu
120	Seokgye	석계	Makes all stops	No service	No service	No service	Seoul Subway Line 6	Gyeongwon Line	1.1	38.5	Seoul	Nowon-gu
121	Sinimun	신이문	Makes all stops	No service	No service	No service		Gyeongwon Line	1.4	39.9	Seoul	Dongdaemun-gu
122	Hankuk Univ. of Foreign Studies	외대앞	Makes all stops	No service	No service	No service		Gyeongwon Line	0.8	40.7	Seoul	Dongdaemun-gu
123	Hoegi	회기	Makes all stops	No service	No service	No service	Gyeongui–Jungang Line Gyeongchun Line	Gyeongwon Line	0.8	41.5	Seoul	Dongdaemun-gu
124	Cheongnyangni (University of Seoul)	청량리 (서울시립대입구)	Makes all stops	No service	Makes all stops	No service	Mugunghwa-ho, Nuriro, ITX-Saemaeul, A-Train, DMZ Train & ITX-Cheongchun services	Seoul Metro Line 1	1.4	42.9	Seoul	Dongdaemun-gu
125	Jegi-dong (Korea Association of Health Promotion)	제기동 (한국건강관리협회)	Makes all stops	No service	Makes all stops	No service		Seoul Metro Line 1	1.0	43.9	Seoul	Dongdaemun-gu
126	Sinseol-dong	신설동	Makes all stops	No service	Makes all stops	No service	(Seongsu Branch)	Seoul Metro Line 1	0.9	44.8	Seoul	Dongdaemun-gu
127	Dongmyo	동묘앞	Makes all stops	No service	Makes all stops	No service	Seoul Subway Line 6	Seoul Metro Line 1	0.7	45.5	Seoul	Jongno-gu
128	Dongdaemun	동대문	Makes all stops	No service	Makes all stops	No service	Seoul Subway Line 4	Seoul Metro Line 1	0.6	46.1	Seoul	Jongno-gu
129	Jongno 5(o)-ga (Samyang Group)	종로5가 (삼양그룹)	Makes all stops	No service	Makes all stops	No service		Seoul Metro Line 1	0.8	46.9	Seoul	Jongno-gu
130	Jongno 3(sam)-ga	종로3가	Makes all stops	No service	Makes all stops	No service	Seoul Subway Line 3 Seoul Subway Line 5	Seoul Metro Line 1	0.9	47.8	Seoul	Jongno-gu
131	Jonggak (Standard Chartered Bank Korea)	종각 (SC제일은행)	Makes all stops	No service	Makes all stops	No service		Seoul Metro Line 1	0.8	48.6	Seoul	Jongno-gu
132	City Hall	시청	Makes all stops	No service	Makes all stops	No service	Seoul Subway Line 2	Seoul Metro Line 1	1.0	49.6	Seoul	Jung-gu
133	Seoul Station	서울역	Makes all stops	No service	Makes all stops	●	(Seoul Station branch) Mugunghwa-ho, ITX-Saemaeul, S-Train & DMZ Train services	Seoul Metro Line 1	1.1	50.7	Seoul	Jung-gu
134	Namyeong	남영	Makes all stops	No service	Makes all stops	｜		Gyeongbu Line	1.7	52.4	Seoul	Yongsan-gu
135	Yongsan	용산	Makes all stops	●	Makes all stops	｜	Mugunghwa-ho, Saemaeul-ho, ITX-Saemaeul, ITX-Cheongchun & G-Train services	Gyeongbu Line	1.5	53.9	Seoul	Yongsan-gu
136	Noryangjin	노량진	Makes all stops	●	Makes all stops	｜	Seoul Subway Line 9	Gyeongbu Line	2.6	56.5	Seoul	Dongjak-gu
137	Daebang	대방	Makes all stops	●	Makes all stops	｜	Sillim Line	Gyeongbu Line	1.5	58.0	Seoul	Yeongdeungpo-gu
138	Singil	신길	Makes all stops	●	Makes all stops	｜	Seoul Subway Line 5	Gyeongbu Line	0.8	58.8	Seoul	Yeongdeungpo-gu
139	Yeongdeungpo	영등포	Makes all stops	●	Makes all stops	●↑	Mugunghwa-ho, Saemaeul-ho & ITX-Saemaeul services	Gyeongbu Line	1.0	59.8	Seoul	Yeongdeungpo-gu
140	Sindorim	신도림	Makes all stops	●	Makes all stops	｜	Seoul Subway Line 2	Gyeongbu Line	1.5	61.3	Seoul	Guro-gu
141	Guro	구로	Makes all stops	●	Makes all stops	｜	Seoul Subway Line 1	Gyeongbu Line	1.1	62.4	Seoul	Guro-gu
142	Guil (Dongyang Mirae Univ.)	구일 (동양미래대학)	Makes all stops	｜	No service			Gyeongin Line	1.4	63.8	Seoul	Guro-gu
143	Gaebong	개봉	Makes all stops	●	No service			Gyeongin Line	1.0	64.8	Seoul	Guro-gu
144	Oryu-dong	오류동	Makes all stops	｜	No service			Gyeongin Line	1.3	66.1	Seoul	Guro-gu
145	Onsu (Sungkonghoe Univ.)	온수 (성공회대입구)	Makes all stops	｜	No service		Seoul Subway Line 7	Gyeongin Line	1.9	68.0	Seoul	Guro-gu
146	Yeokgok (The Catholic Univ. of Korea)	역곡 (가톨릭대)	Makes all stops	●	No service			Gyeongin Line	1.3	69.3	Gyeonggi-do	Bucheon-si
147	Sosa (Seoul Theological Univ.)	소사 (서울신대)	Makes all stops	｜	No service		Seohae Line	Gyeongin Line	1.5	70.8	Gyeonggi-do	Bucheon-si
148	Bucheon (Bucheon Univ.)	부천 (부천대)	Makes all stops	●	No service			Gyeongin Line	1.1	71.9	Gyeonggi-do	Bucheon-si
149	Jung-dong	중동	Makes all stops	｜	No service			Gyeongin Line	1.7	73.6	Gyeonggi-do	Bucheon-si
150	Songnae	송내	Makes all stops	●	No service			Gyeongin Line	1.0	74.6	Gyeonggi-do	Bucheon-si
151	Bugae	부개	Makes all stops	｜	No service			Gyeongin Line	1.2	75.8	Incheon	Bupyeong-gu
152	Bupyeong (The Catholic Univ. of Korea Incheon St. Mary's Hospital)	부평 (가톨릭대 인천성모병원)	Makes all stops	●	No service		Incheon Subway Line 1	Gyeongin Line	1.5	77.3	Incheon	Bupyeong-gu
153	Baegun	백운	Makes all stops	｜	No service			Gyeongin Line	1.7	79.0	Incheon	Bupyeong-gu
154	Dongam	동암	Makes all stops	●	No service			Gyeongin Line	1.5	80.5	Incheon	Bupyeong-gu
155	Ganseok	간석	Makes all stops	｜	No service			Gyeongin Line	1.2	81.7	Incheon	Michuhol-gu
156	Juan	주안	Makes all stops	●	No service		Incheon Subway Line 2	Gyeongin Line	1.2	82.9	Incheon	Michuhol-gu
157	Dohwa	도화	Makes all stops	｜	No service			Gyeongin Line	1.0	83.9	Incheon	Michuhol-gu
158	Jemulpo (Incheon Univ. Jemulpo Campus)	제물포 (인천대학교 제물포캠퍼스)	Makes all stops	●	No service			Gyeongin Line	1.0	84.9	Incheon	Michuhol-gu
159	Dowon	도원	Makes all stops	｜	No service			Gyeongin Line	1.4	86.3	Incheon	Jemulpo-gu
160	Dongincheon	동인천	Makes all stops	●	No service			Gyeongin Line	1.2	87.5	Incheon	Jemulpo-gu
161	Incheon	인천	Makes all stops	No service	No service		Suin–Bundang Line	Gyeongin Line	1.9	89.4	Incheon	Jemulpo-gu
↑ Joins other services at Guro station ↑
141	Guro	구로	●	●	●	｜	Seoul Subway Line 1	Gyeongbu Line	---	62.4	Seoul	Guro-gu
P142	Gasan Digital Complex (Mario Outlet)	가산디지털단지 (마리오아울렛)	No service		●	｜	Seoul Subway Line 7	Gyeongbu Line	2.4	64.8	Seoul	Geumcheon-gu
P143	Doksan	독산	No service		｜	｜		Gyeongbu Line	2.0	66.8	Seoul	Geumcheon-gu
P144	Geumcheon-gu Office	금천구청	No service		○	●	Seoul Subway Line 1	Gyeongbu Line	1.2	68.0	Seoul	Geumcheon-gu
P145	Seoksu	석수	No service		｜	｜		Gyeongbu Line	2.3	70.3	Gyeonggi-do	Anyang-si
P146	Gwanak (Anyang Art Park)	관악 (안양예술공원)	No service		｜	｜		Gyeongbu Line	1.9	72.2	Gyeonggi-do	Anyang-si
P147	Anyang	안양	No service		●	●	Mugunghwa-ho (limited service)	Gyeongbu Line	2.4	74.6	Gyeonggi-do	Anyang-si
P148	Myeonghak (Sungkyul Univ.)	명학 (성결대)	No service		｜	｜		Gyeongbu Line	2.2	76.8	Gyeonggi-do	Anyang-si
P149	Geumjeong	금정	No service		●	｜	Seoul Subway Line 4	Gyeongbu Line	1.4	78.2	Gyeonggi-do	Gunpo-si
P150	Gunpo	군포	No service		｜	●		Gyeongbu Line	2.2	80.4	Gyeonggi-do	Gunpo-si
P151	Dangjeong (Hansei Univ.)	당정 (한세대)	No service		｜	｜		Gyeongbu Line	1.2	81.6	Gyeonggi-do	Gunpo-si
P152	Uiwang (Korea Nat'l Univ. of Transportation)	의왕 (한국교통대)	No service		○	●		Gyeongbu Line	3.0	84.6	Gyeonggi-do	Uiwang-si
P153	Sungkyunkwan Univ.	성균관대	No service		●	●		Gyeongbu Line	2.9	87.5	Gyeonggi-do	Suwon-si
P154	Hwaseo	화서	No service		｜	｜		Gyeongbu Line	2.6	90.1	Gyeonggi-do	Suwon-si
P155	Suwon	수원	No service		●	●	Mugunghwa-ho, Saemaeul-ho, ITX-Saemaeul, G-Train, & S-Train services	Gyeongbu Line	2.1	92.2	Gyeonggi-do	Suwon-si
P156	Seryu	세류	No service		｜	｜		Gyeongbu Line	2.9	95.1	Gyeonggi-do	Suwon-si
P157	Byeongjeom (Hanshin Univ.)	병점 (한신대)	No service		●	●	Seoul Subway Line 1	Gyeongbu Line	4.3	99.4	Gyeonggi-do	Hwaseong-si
P158	Sema	세마	No service		｜	｜		Gyeongbu Line	2.4	101.8	Gyeonggi-do	Osan-si
P159	Osan College	오산대	No service		｜	｜		Gyeongbu Line	2.7	104.5	Gyeonggi-do	Osan-si
P160	Osan	오산	No service		●	●	Mugunghwa-ho (limited service)	Gyeongbu Line	2.7	107.2	Gyeonggi-do	Osan-si
P161	Jinwi	진위	No service		｜	｜		Gyeongbu Line	4.0	111.2	Gyeonggi-do	Pyeongtaek-si
P162	Songtan	송탄	No service		｜	｜		Gyeongbu Line	3.8	115.0	Gyeonggi-do	Pyeongtaek-si
P163	Seojeong-ri (Kookje College)	서정리 (국제대학)	No service		●	●	Mugunghwa-ho (limited service)	Gyeongbu Line	2.2	117.2	Gyeonggi-do	Pyeongtaek-si
P164	PyeongtaekJije (Korea Nat'l Univ. of Welfare)	평택지제 (한국복지대학)	No service		｜	｜	KTX	Gyeongbu Line	4.8	122.0	Gyeonggi-do	Pyeongtaek-si
P165	Pyeongtaek	평택	No service		●	●	Mugunghwa-ho, Saemaeul-ho (limited service) & ITX-Saemaeul (limited service)	Gyeongbu Line	3.7	125.7	Gyeonggi-do	Pyeongtaek-si
P166	Seonghwan (Namseoul Univ.)	성환 (남서울대)	No service		●	●	Mugunghwa-ho (limited service)	Gyeongbu Line	9.4	135.1	Chungcheongnam-do	Cheonan-si
P167	Jiksan	직산	No service		｜	｜		Gyeongbu Line	5.4	140.5	Chungcheongnam-do	Cheonan-si
P168	Dujeong	두정	No service		●	●		Gyeongbu Line	3.8	144.3	Chungcheongnam-do	Cheonan-si
P169	Cheonan	천안	No service		●	●	Mugunghwa-ho, Saemaeul-ho, ITX-Saemaeul & S-Train services	Gyeongbu Line	3.0	147.3	Chungcheongnam-do	Cheonan-si
P170	Bongmyeong	봉명	No service		Makes all stops (limited service)			Janghang Line	1.3	148.6	Chungcheongnam-do	Cheonan-si
P171	Ssangyong (Korea Nazarene Univ.)	쌍용 (나사렛대)	No service		Makes all stops (limited service)			Janghang Line	1.6	150.2	Chungcheongnam-do	Cheonan-si
P172	Asan (Sun Moon Univ.)	아산 (선문대)	No service		Makes all stops (limited service)		Mugunghwa-ho, Saemaeul-ho & G-Train (at Cheonan-Asan station)	Janghang Line	1.6	151.8	Chungcheongnam-do	Asan-si
P173	Tangjeong	탕정	No service		Makes all stops (limited service)			Janghang Line	1.8	153.6	Chungcheongnam-do	Asan-si
P174	Baebang	배방	No service		Makes all stops (limited service)			Janghang Line	3.1	156.7	Chungcheongnam-do	Asan-si
P175	Punggi (2029)	풍기	No service		Makes all stops (limited service)			Janghang Line			Chungcheongnam-do	Asan-si
P176	Onyangoncheon	온양온천	No service		Makes all stops (limited service)		Mugunghwa-ho, Saemaeul-ho, & G-Train services	Janghang Line	4.9	161.6	Chungcheongnam-do	Asan-si
P177	Sinchang (Soonchunhyang Univ.)	신창 (순천향대)	No service		Makes all stops (limited service)			Janghang Line	5.1	166.7	Chungcheongnam-do	Asan-si

=== Yeongdeungpo–Gwangmyeong shuttle service ===
Station number	Station name English	Station name Hangul	Transfer	Line name	Distance in km	Total distance	Location	
↑ Same stops as all-stop Gyeongbu Line services until Yeongdeungpo ↑
P144	Geumcheon-gu Office	금천구청	(Main Lines)	Gyeongbu high-speed railway	---	68.0	Seoul	Geumcheon-gu
P144-1	Gwangmyeong	광명	KTX	Gyeongbu high-speed railway	4.7	72.7	Gyeonggi-do	Gwangmyeong-si

=== Byeongjeom Depot spur service ===
Station number	Station name English	Station name Hangul	Transfer	Distance in km	Total distance	Location	
↑ Joins other Gyeongbu Line services at Byeongjeom ↑
P157	Byeongjeom (Hanshin Univ.)	병점 (한신대)	Seoul Subway Line 1	---	99.4	Gyeonggi-do	Hwaseong-si
P157-1	Seodongtan	서동탄		2.2	101.6	Gyeonggi-do	Osan-si

== Historical timeline ==
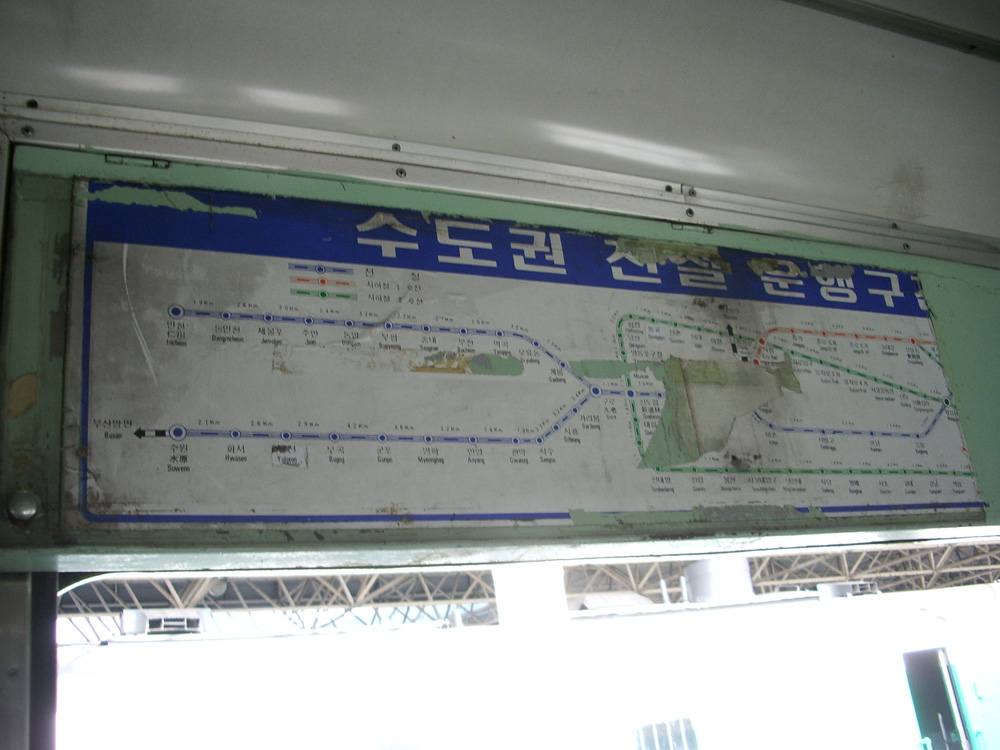
Fragment of a Seoul Subway map from the early 1980s, which shows the Korail-managed portions of Line 1 in blue and the Seoul Metro-managed underground portion as red

1974

August 15: Line 1 is officially opened with 9 stations from Seoul to Cheongnyangni (whose distance is 7.8 kilometers (4.8 mi)), creating a system of 28 stations (excluding the 9 metro stations) on national railroads from Seongbuk station (now: Kwangwoon University station, the then-northern terminus) to Incheon station and Suwon station. Korail is named Korean National Railroad, with Line 1 just referring to the Seoul-Cheongnyangni section.

1978

December 9: The Gyeongwon Line from Yongsan to Seongbuk opens as a new branch, with Ichon and Seongsu (now part of the Jungang Line).

1979

February 1: Yuljeon station is opened.

1980

January 5: Sinimun station is opened.
April 1: Seobinggo, Hannam and Hoegi (now part of the Jungang Line) are opened.
July 10: Seongsu is renamed Eungbong station

1982

August 2: Seoksu station is opened.
September 25: Gyeongbu Express was launched between Seoul and Suwon.

1984

January 1: Yuljeon station is renamed Seongdae-ap station.
May 22: Sindorim station is opened.
November 20: Baegun station is opened.

1985

January 14: Seokgye station is opened.
April 20: Chang-dong is opened as a northward extension.
August 22: Wolgye and Nokcheon are opened.
October 18: Oksu station (now part of the Jungang Line) is opened.

1986

September 2: 6 stations from Uijeongbu to Chang-dong are opened as a northward extension.

1987

October 5: Uijeongbu Bukbu station is opened.
December 31: Jung-dong station is opened.

1988

January 16: Onsu station is opened.
October 25: The Ansan Line is opened as a southward branch, from Geumjeong station to Ansan station.

1994

July 11: Ganseok and Dowon are opened.
December 1: Seongdae-ap station is renamed to Sungkyunkwan University.

1995

February 16: Guil station is opened.

1996

January 1: Hwigyeong station is renamed to Hankuk University of Foreign Studies station
March 28: Bugae station is opened.

1997

April 30: Sosa station is opened.

1998

January 7: Singil and Doksan are opened.

2000

Korea National Railroad and Line 1 are integrated as Seoul (Metropolitan) Subway Line 1.

2001

November 30: Dohwa station is opened.

2003

April 30: Seryu and Byeongjeom are opened as a southward extension. The Ansan Line service is replaced with an extended Seoul Subway Line 4.

2004

August 25: Bugok station is renamed Uiwang station.

2005

January 20: 8 stations from Byeongjeom to Cheonan are opened as another southward extension.
December 16: The Gyeongwon Line branch from Yongsan station to Hoegi station and the Jungang Line from Hoegi station to Deokso station open and are renamed to the separate Yongsan-Deokso Line. This service was the predecessor to the current Jungang Line.
December 21: Dongmyo station is opened.
December 27: Sema and Osan College stations are opened.

2006

June 30: Jinwi and Jije stations are opened.
July 1: Garibong station is renamed to Gasan Digital Complex.
December 15: 8 stations from Soyosan to Uijeongbu Bukbu are opened as a northward extension. A spur line to Gwangmyeong station is created. Uijeongbu Bukbu station is renamed to Ganeung.

2007

December 28: Deokgye station is opened.

2008

December 15: 6 stations from Cheonan to Sinchang are opened as another southward extension.
December 29: Siheung station is renamed to Geumcheon-gu Office.

2010

January 21: Dangjeong station is opened.
February 26: Seodongtan station is opened.

2015

February 3: Gyeongin Line express trains start stopping at Gaebong and Jemulpo stations.

2017

July 6: A new limited express service was launched between Yongsan and Dongincheon stations.

2019

December 30: All Gyeongbu Line express trains start stopping at Geumjeong and Sungkyunkwan University stations and are extended to Cheongnyangni. Gyeongbu Line express trains no longer stop at Gunpo station.

2021

October 30: Tangjeong station opened as an in-fill station between Asan and Baebang.

2023

December 16: Three stations from Soyosan station to Yeoncheon station on the Gyeongwon Line are opened as a northward extension of the line.

== Rolling stock ==
=== Current ===
- Seoul Metro 1000 series
  - Rheostat-controlled electric car (rebuilt cars) – since 1974
  - GTO-VVVF inverter-controlled electric car – since 1999 (Restricted to DC/AC neutral areas)
- Korail Class 311000
  - First generation – since 1996 (Currently in process of being retired)
  - Second generation – since 2003
  - Third generation – since 2005
  - Fourth generation – since 2019
  - Fifth generation – since 2024
- Korail Class 319000 (for Gwangmyeong Shuttle) – since 2006
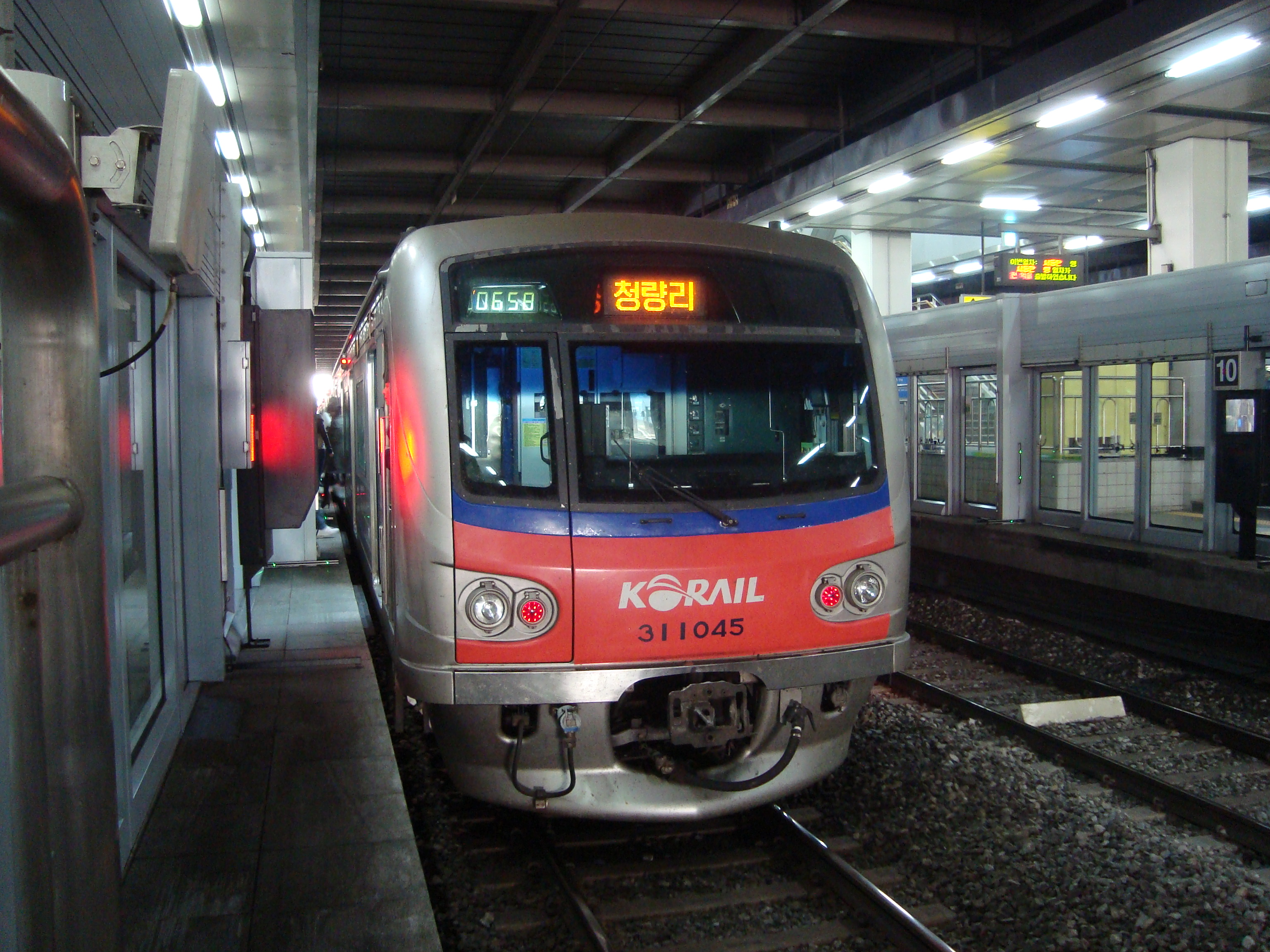
Korail Class 311000 (Second generation)

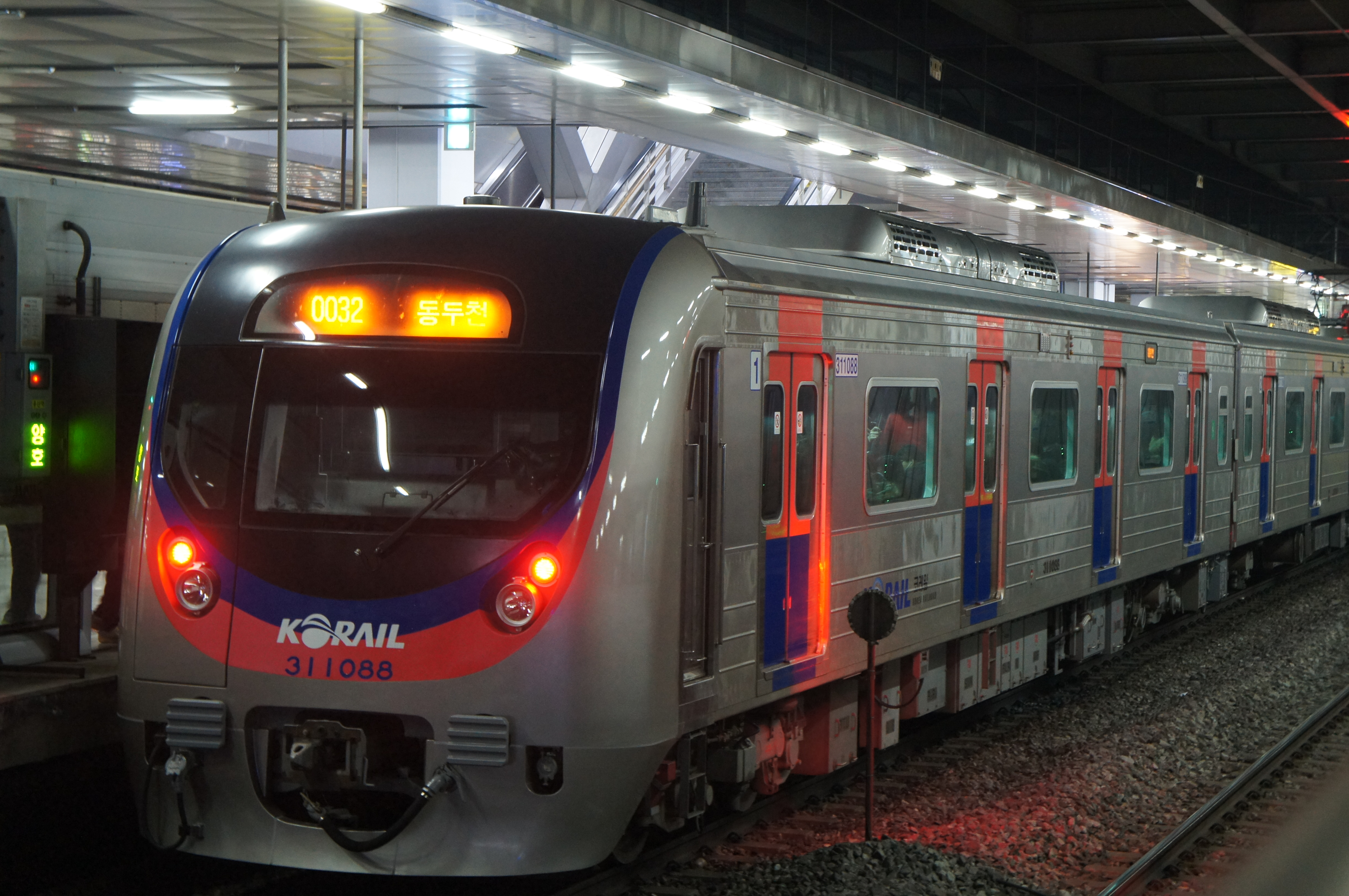
Korail Class 311000 (Third generation)

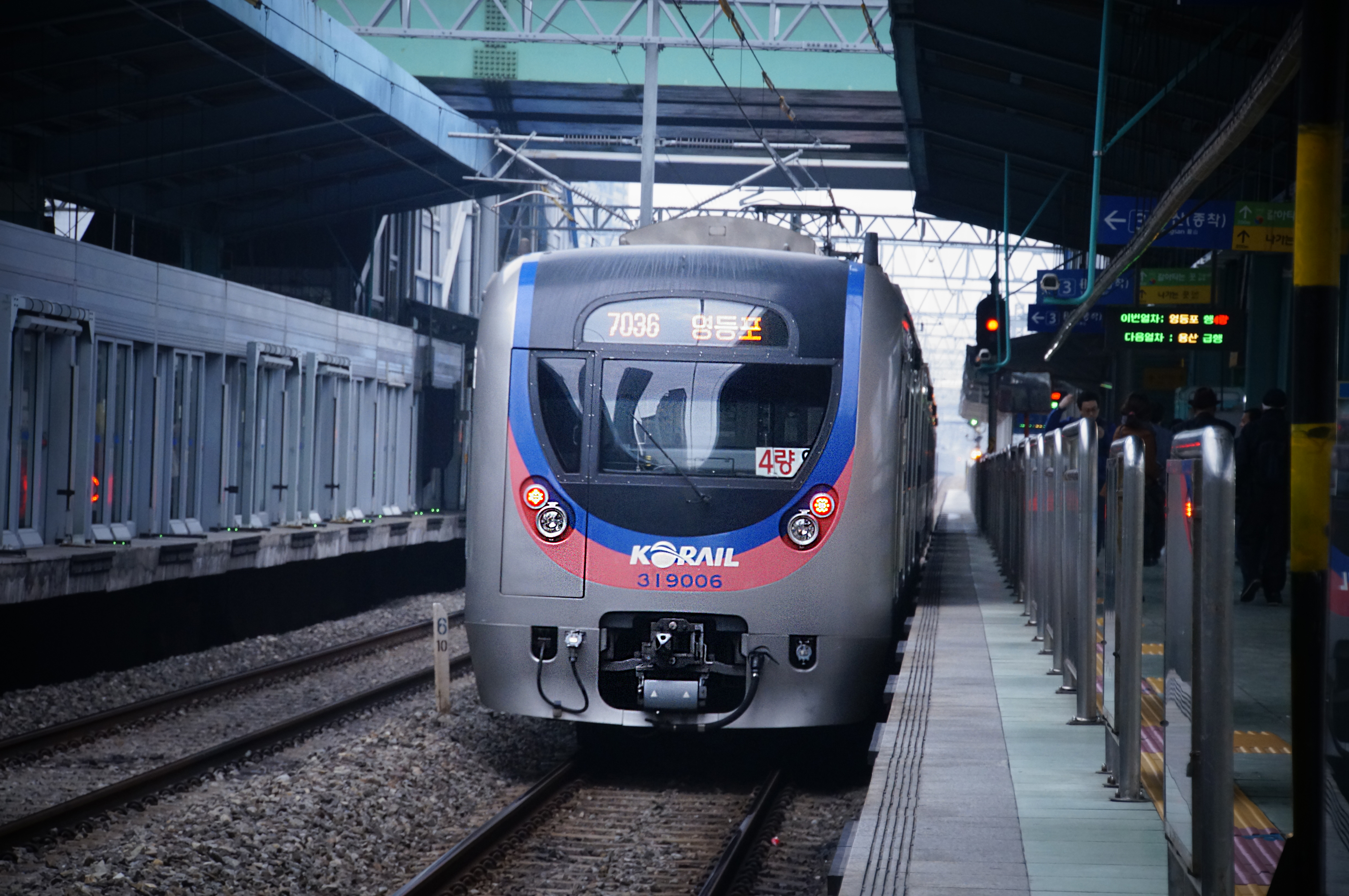
Korail Class 319000

=== Former ===
- Seoul Metro 1000 series
  - Rheostat-controlled electric car (1st batch, unrebuilt) – 1974-2004
- Korail Class 1000
  - First generation – 1974-2004 (some non-driving cars lasted until 2014)
  - Second generation – 1986-2017 (some non-driving cars lasted until 2019)
  - Third generation – 1994-2020
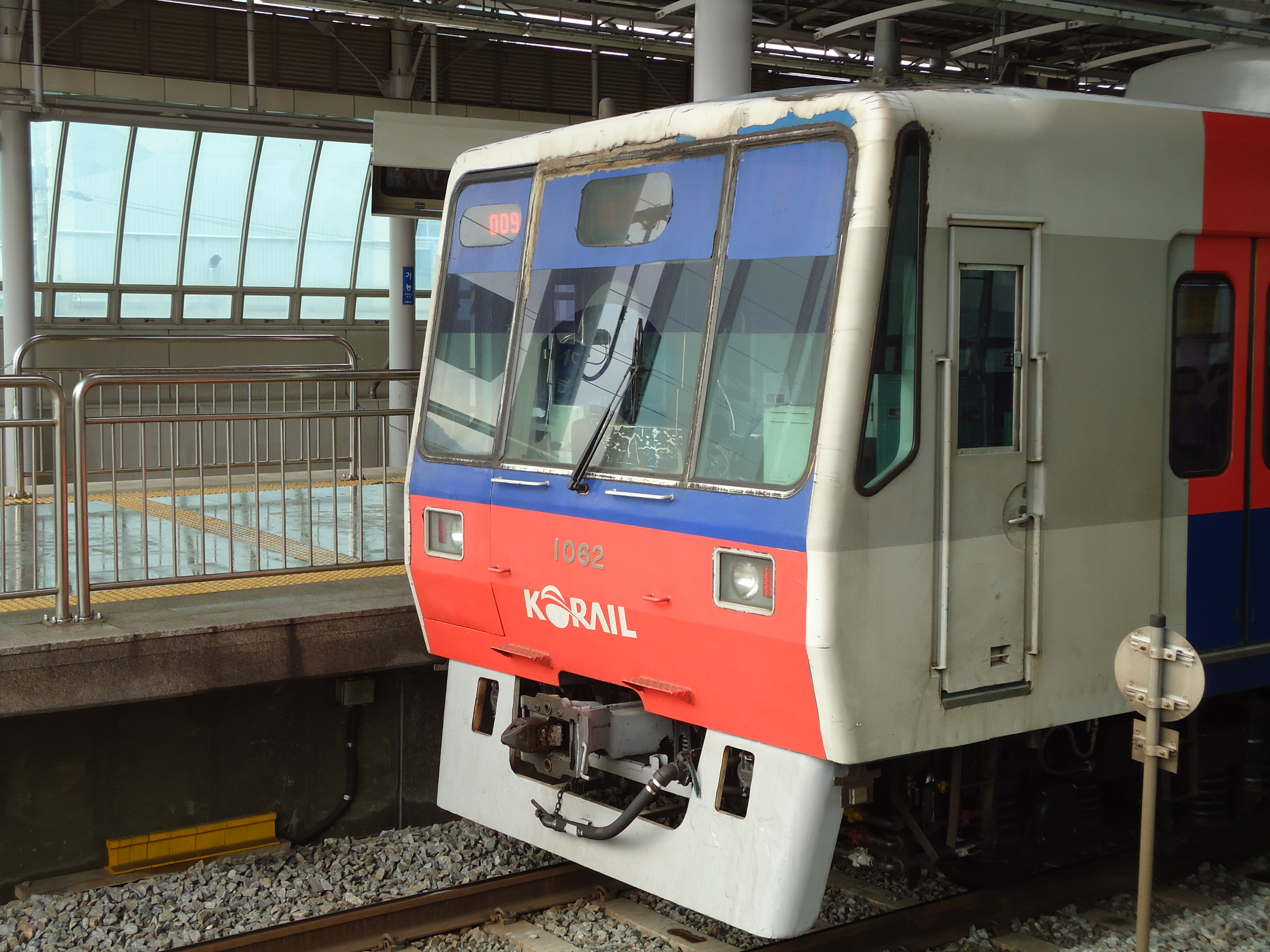
Korail Class 1000 (2nd batch)

== Depots and facilities ==
(from north to south)

- Majeon signal box between Deokye and Yangju stations
- Seongbuk Depot
- Imun Depot
- Guro Depot
- Siheung Depot (actually after Oido station on Line 4, also used for heavy maintenance of Line 1 trains owned by Korail, accessed by a crossover located after Geumjeong station)
- Byeongjeom Depot

== Ridership ==
Seoul Subway Line 1 Ridership (Note: The ridership is calculated based on boarding and transferring passengers (a+c). The data tallies between the two sources but the Seoul Metro source is more granular. The ridership data is derived from the 서울교통공사 수송실적 (Seoul Metro transport performance) data/report.)
Year	Ridership	Change (%)	Remarks
2026	81,406,815		Updated as of June 2026
2025	157,310,280	▲6	
2024	148,436,350	▲2.6	
2023	144,647,007	▲13	
2022	128,041,415	▲14.8	
2021	111,547,561	▼3.5	
2020	115,584,427	▼32.9	COVID-19 pandemic
2019	172,369,686	▲1.8	
2018	169,355,650	▼2.9	
2017	174,498,000	▼3.6	
2016	181,081,000	▲10.3	
2015	164,139,000	▼3.9	
2014	170,807,000	▲1.5	
2013	168,206,000	▲0.3	
2012	167,784,000	▼1.4	
2011	170,110,000	▲3.5	
2010	164,409,000	▲0.3	
2009	163,860,000	▼2.5	
2008	168,097,000	▼0.9	
2007	169,635,000	▼0.2	
2006	169,903,000	▼1.2	
2005	171,944,000	▼0.1	
2004	172,081,000	▲3.1	
2003	166,914,000	▼2.4	
2002	171,061,000	▼2.1	
2001	174,660,000	▼1.2	
2000	176,766,000	▲0.5	
1999	175,962,000	▼1.5	
1998	178,680,000	▼2.7	
1997	183,609,000	-	

== See also ==
- Subways in South Korea
- Seoul Metropolitan Subway
