= Uiwang station =

Station of the Seoul Metropolitan Subway

Coordinates: 37°19′16″N 126°56′54″E

의왕 (한국교통대학교); Uiwang (Korea Nat'l Univ. of Transportation)
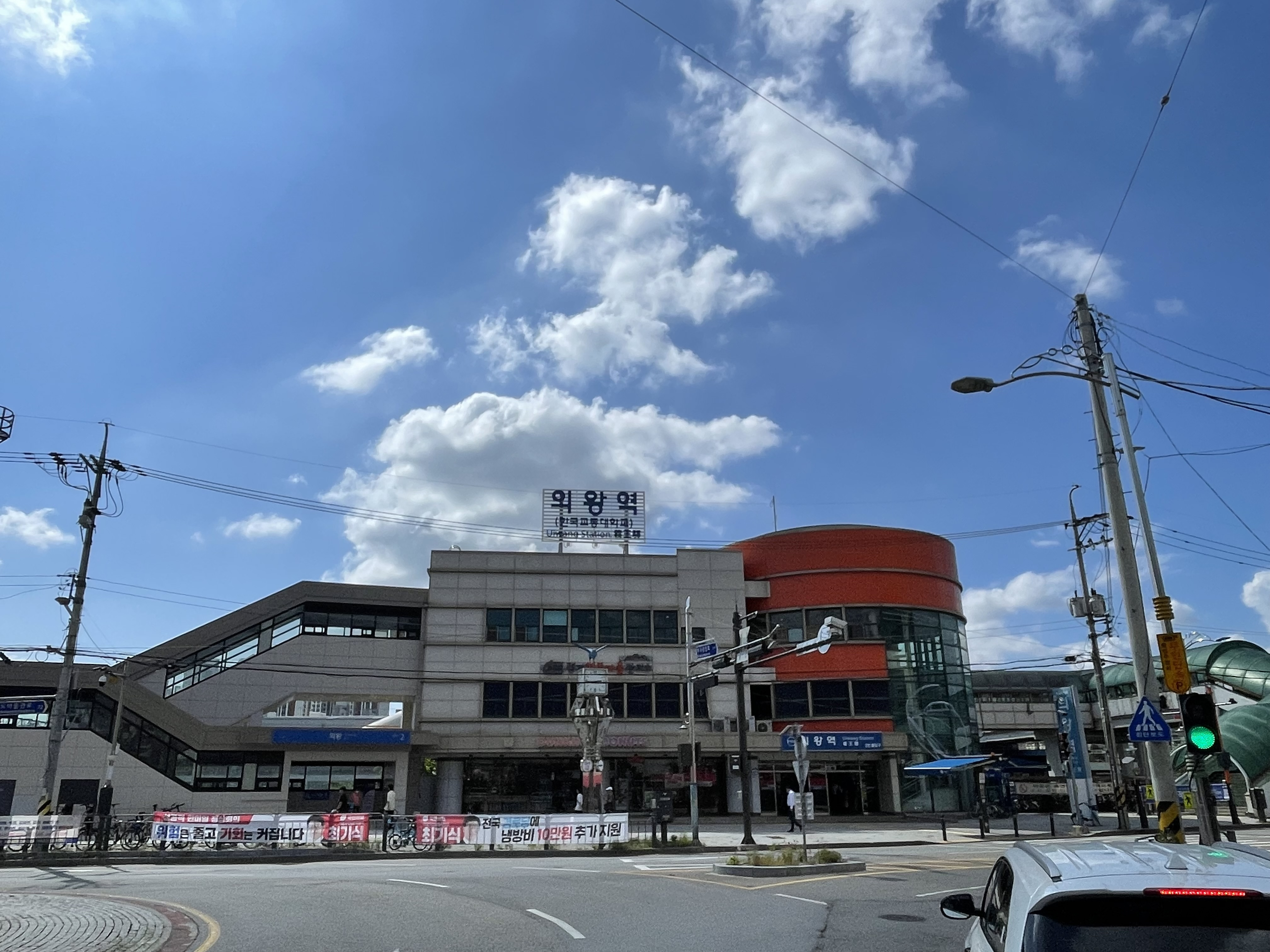
- Station Sign

Korean name
- Hangul: 의왕역
- Hanja: 義王驛
- RR: Uiwang-yeok
- MR: Ŭiwang-yŏk

General information
- Location: 191 Sam-dong, 66 Cheoldobangmulgwanno, Uiwang-si, Gyeonggi-do
- Operator: Korail
- Line: Line 1
- Platforms: 2
- Tracks: 4

Construction
- Structure type: Aboveground

History
- Opened: May 1, 1944

Key dates
- 15 August 1974: Line 1 opened

Passengers
- (Daily) Based on Jan-Dec of 2012. Line 1: 16,041
Location

Uiwang station (Korean: 의왕역) is a ground-level metro station on line 1 of the Seoul Subway in Uiwang, South Korea. The station's four exits offer access to the Korea National University of Transportation, the Korean Railroad Museum and the Bugok Dong area of Uiwang. Travel time from Uiwang Station to Seoul Station on Line 1 is 50 minutes.

== Disambiguation ==
"Uiwang station" is also the former name of what is now known as Obong Station. The two are separate entities.

== History ==
Uiwang station opened on May 1, 1944, under the name of Bugok station (부곡역/富谷驛), a name taken from the "dong" in which it is located. Trains on the Seoul Subway began calling at the station on August 15, 1974. The current station building was completed on February 17, 2002. On June 25, 2004, the station changed its name to Uiwang and almost three years later, on February 20, 2007, the hanja name changed from 儀旺驛 to 義王驛.

== Services ==
The first train of the day on weekdays (not including national holidays) is at 5.22 a.m. northbound and 5.29 a.m. southbound, while the last is at 12.01 a.m. northbound and 12.14 a.m. southbound. Northbound trains have various destinations. Some terminate at Guro, some at Dongmyo, others at Cheongnyangni, while some continue as far as Kwangwoon University. None, however, continue beyond Kwangwoon University, so if travelling beyond is required, it is necessary to change trains. Some southbound trains terminate at Byeongjeom or Seodongtan, while the remainder continue to Cheonan or further south-west to Sinchang.

Preceding station	Seoul Metropolitan Subway	Following station
Dangjeong towards Kwangwoon University	Line 1	Sungkyunkwan University towards Seodongtan or Sinchang
Geumjeong towards Cheongnyangni	Line 1 Gyeongbu Express	Sungkyunkwan University towards Sinchang
Gunpo towards Seoul	Line 1 Gyeongbu Express	Sungkyunkwan University towards Sinchang
