= Wolgye station =

Station of the Seoul Metropolitan Subway

월계; Wolgye
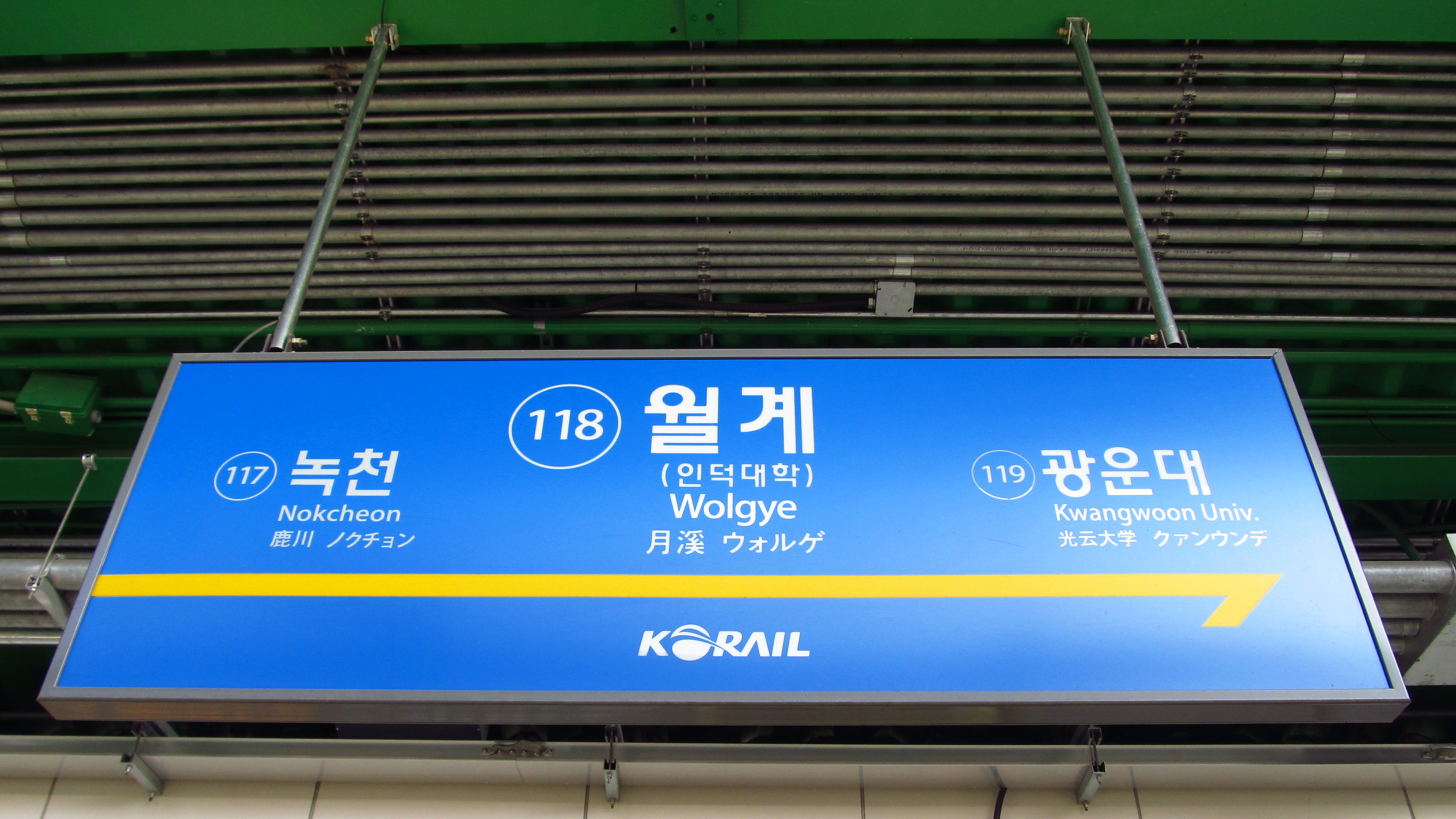

Korean name
- Hangul: 월계역
- Hanja: 月溪驛
- Revised Romanization: Wolgye-yeok
- McCune–Reischauer: Wŏlgye-yŏk

General information
- Location: 263-1 Wolgye 2-dong, 40 Wolgyero 53 gil, Nowon-gu, Seoul; South Korea
- Coordinates: 37°37′54″N 127°03′29″E
- Operator: Korail
- Line: Gyeongwon Line
- Platforms: 2
- Tracks: 2

Construction
- Structure type: Aboveground

History
- Opened: July 22, 1985

Passengers
- Based on Jan-Dec of 2012. Line 1: 11,926

Services
Preceding station	Seoul Metropolitan Subway	Following station
Nokcheon towards Yeoncheon	Line 1	Kwangwoon University towards Incheon
Location

Wolgye Station is a metro station on Seoul Subway Line 1. In the northern part of the city, it lies on the line connecting Seoul's city centre with the cities to the north in Gyeonggi-do.

== Gallery ==
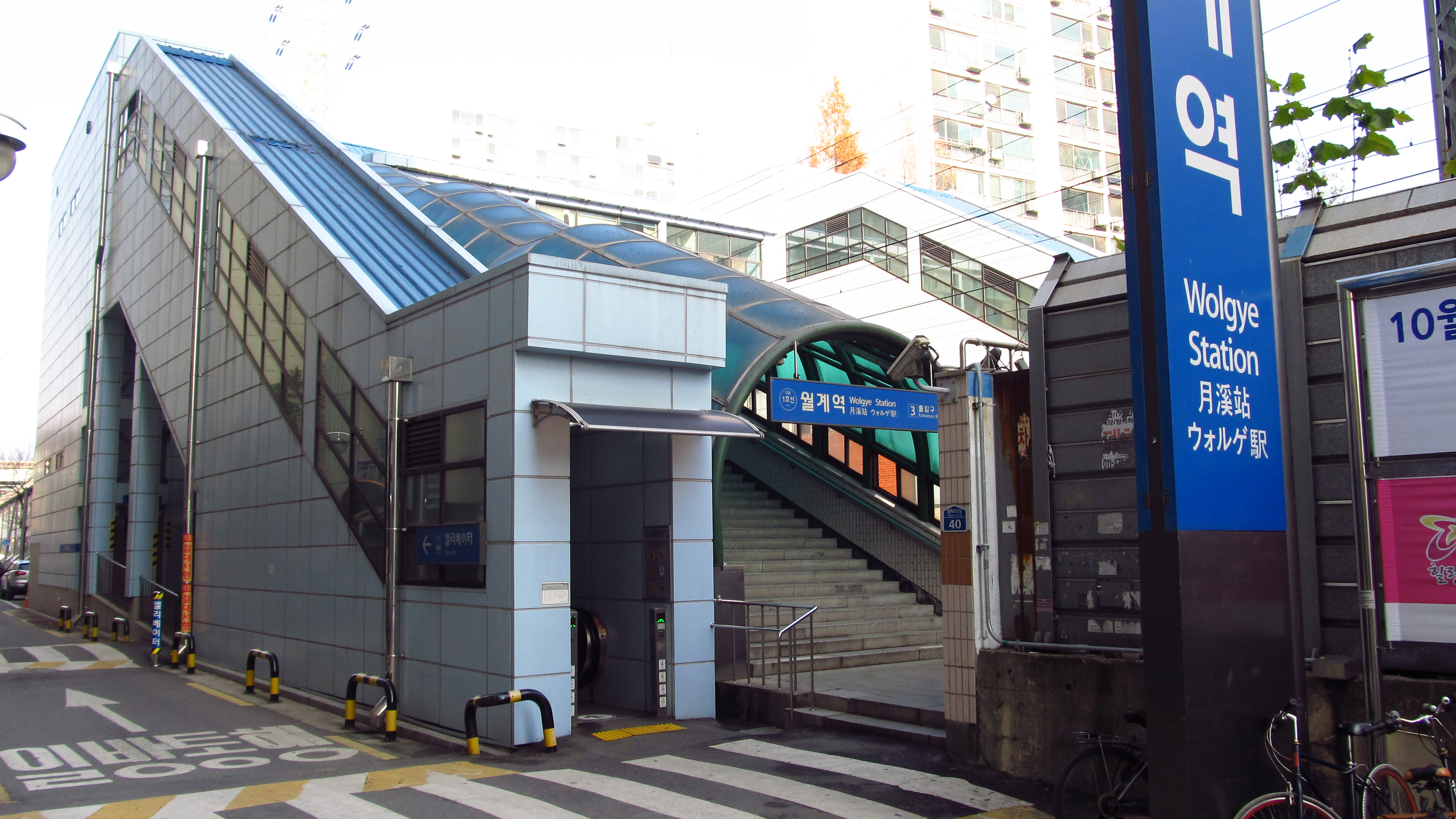
Exit 3

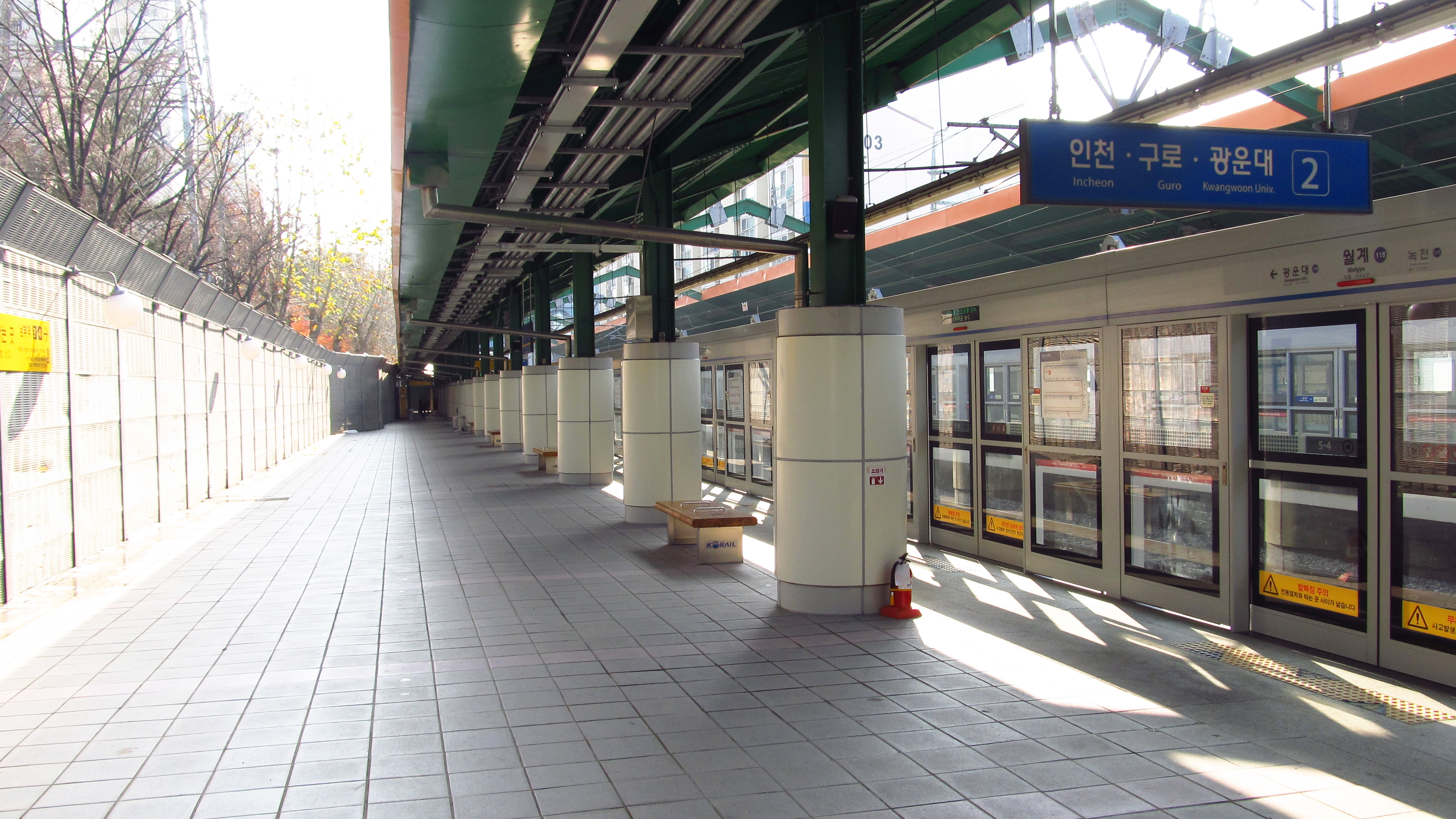
Station Platform
