= Dangjeong station =

Train station in South Korea

Coordinates: 37°20′40″N 126°56′54″E

| 당정 (한세대); Dangjeong (Hansei Univ.) |
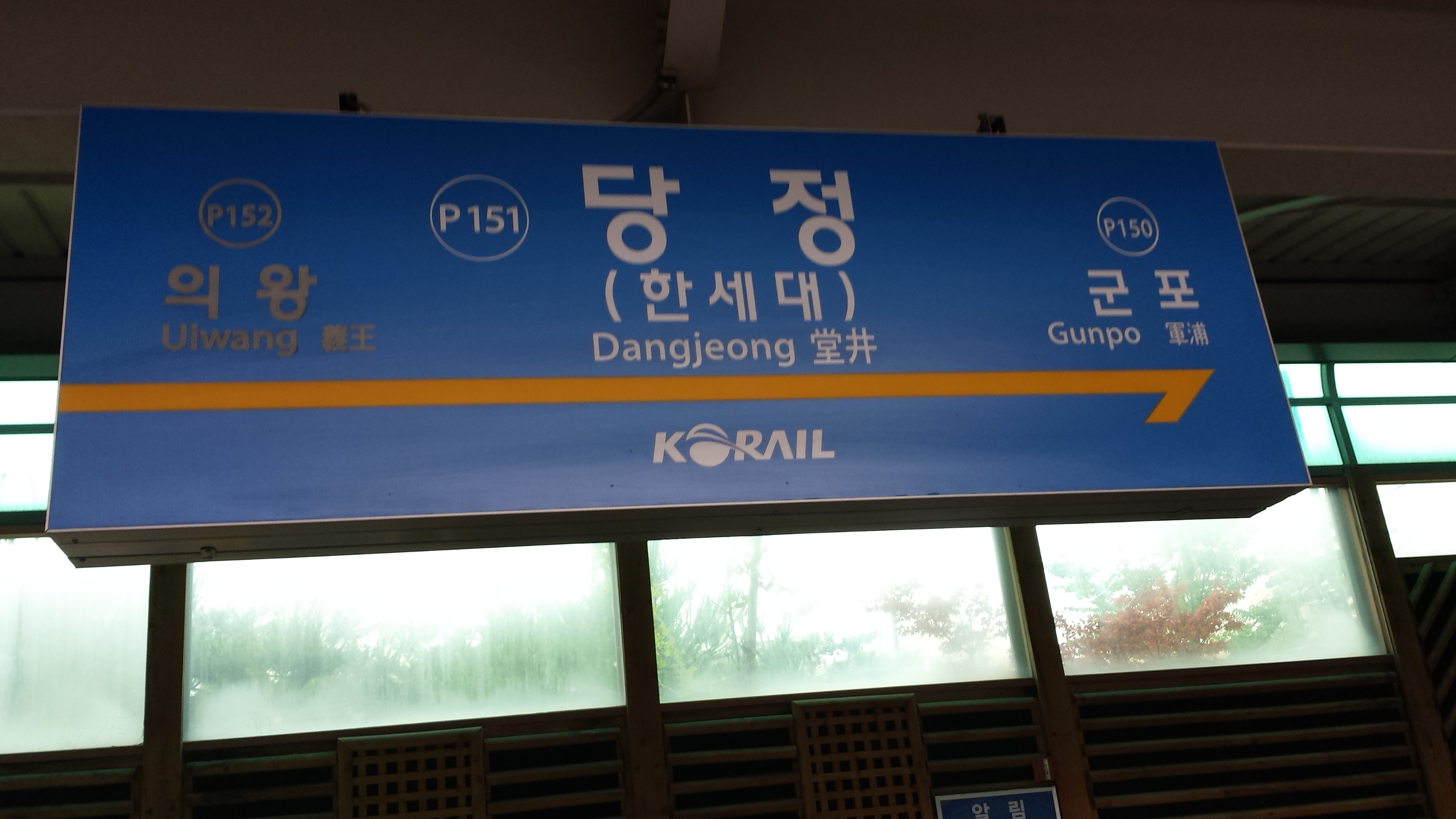

Korean name
- Hangul: 당정역
- Hanja: 堂井驛
- RR: Dangjeong-yeok
- MR: Tangjŏng-yŏk

General information
- Location: 91 Dangjeongyeongno, 938 Dangjeong-dong, Gunpo-si, Gyeonggi-do
- Operator: Korail
- Line: Line 1
- Platforms: 2
- Tracks: 4

Construction
- Structure type: Aboveground

Key dates
- January 21, 2010: Line 1 opened

Passengers
- (Daily) Based on Jan-Dec of 2012. Line 1: 13,206
Location

Dangjeong station (Korean: 당정역) is an infill station on the Seoul Metropolitan Subway Line 1. It serves the city of Gunpo in Gyeonggi Province, South Korea and is the subway station closest to Hansei University.

| Preceding station | Seoul Metropolitan Subway | Following station |
|---|---|---|
| Gunpo towards Kwangwoon University | Line 1 | Uiwang towards Seodongtan or Sinchang |
