= Dobongsan station =

Metro station in Seoul, South Korea

도봉산; Dobongsan
도봉산; Dobongsan
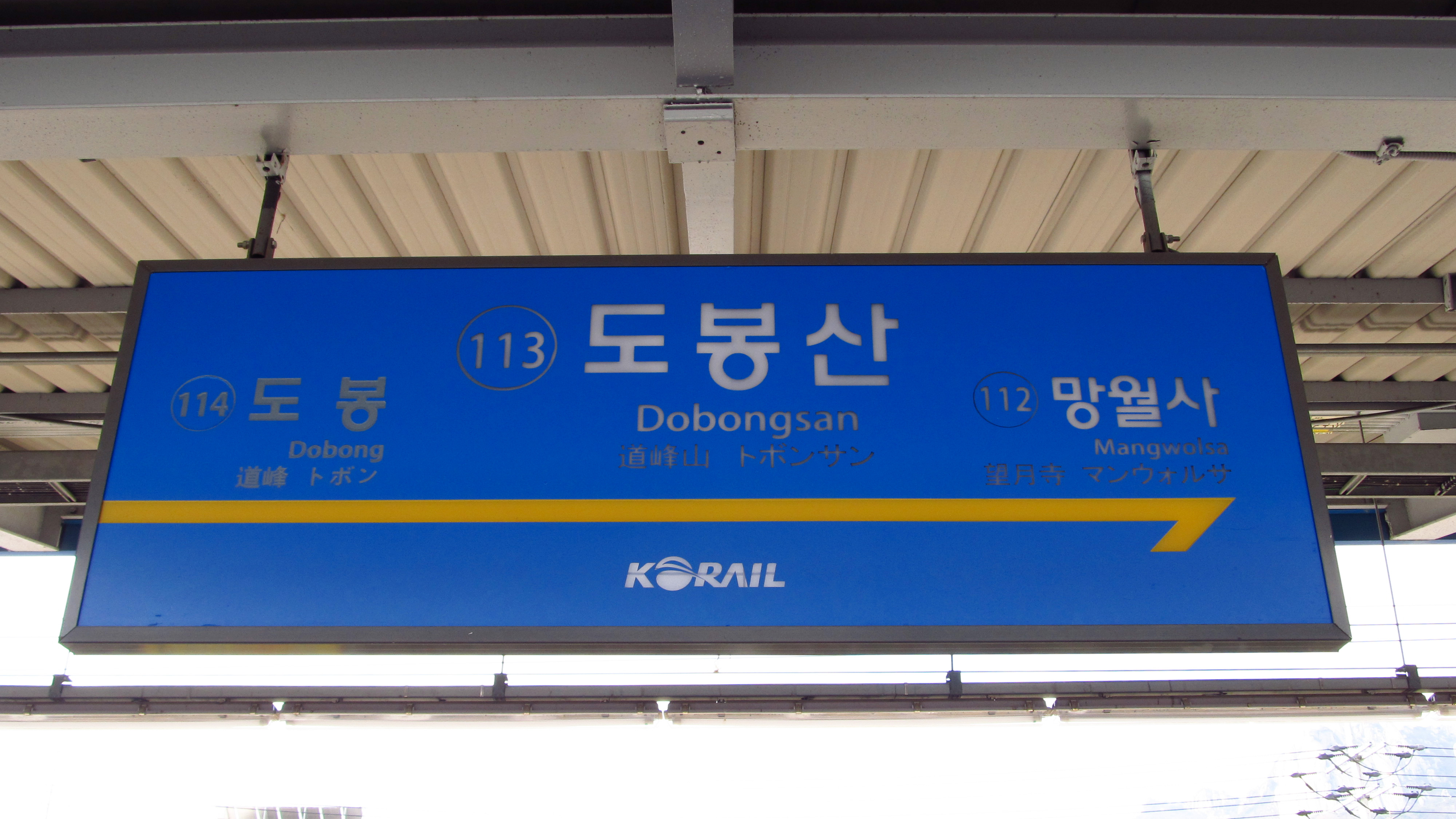
- Station nameplate (Line 1)

Korean name
- Hangul: 도봉산역
- Hanja: 道峰山驛
- Revised Romanization: Dobongsannyeok
- McCune–Reischauer: Tobongsannyŏk

General information
- Location: 363 Dobong 2-dong, 964-33 Dobong-ro, Dobong-gu, Seoul; South Korea
- Coordinates: 37°41′22″N 127°02′45″E
- Operator: Korail, Seoul Metro
- Platforms: 2
- Tracks: 4; 2

Construction
- Structure type: Aboveground

History
- Opened: September 2, 1986; October 11, 1996

Passengers
- Based on Jan–Dec of 2012. Line 1: 11,897; Line 7: 20,537
Services
Preceding station	Seoul Metropolitan Subway	Following station
Mangwolsa towards Yeoncheon	Line 1	Dobong towards Incheon
Hoeryong towards Dongducheon	Line 1 Gyeongwon Express	Chang-dong towards Incheon
Jangam Terminus	Line 7	Suraksan towards Seongnam
Location

Dobongsan Station is a subway station on the Seoul Subway Line 1 and Line 7. It is the closest station to Mt. Dobong, where its name also comes from.

This station is geographically the northernmost station in Seoul. In addition, the Line 7 station is a transfer station operated by Seoul Metro that is not underground.

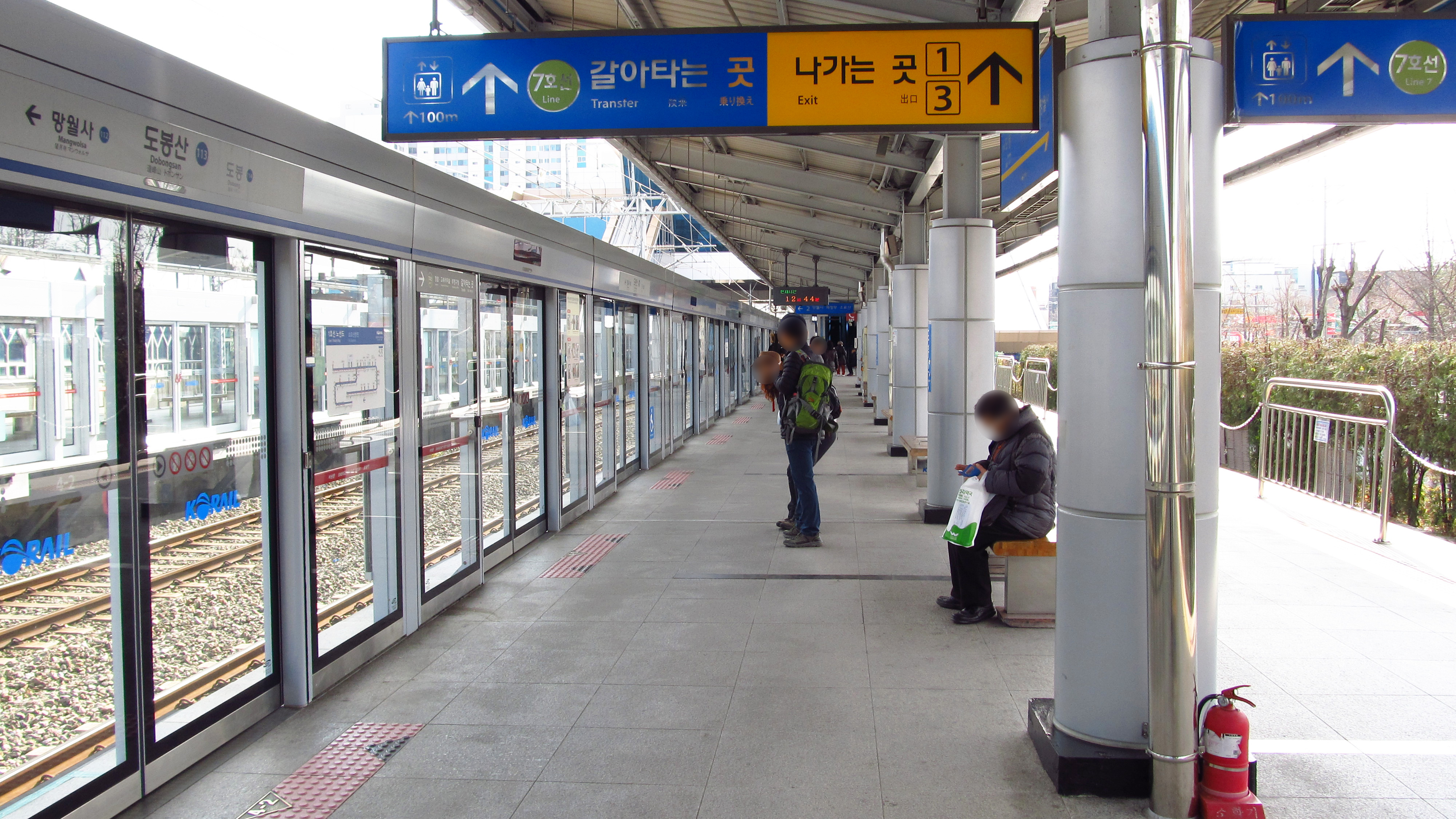
Line 1 platform

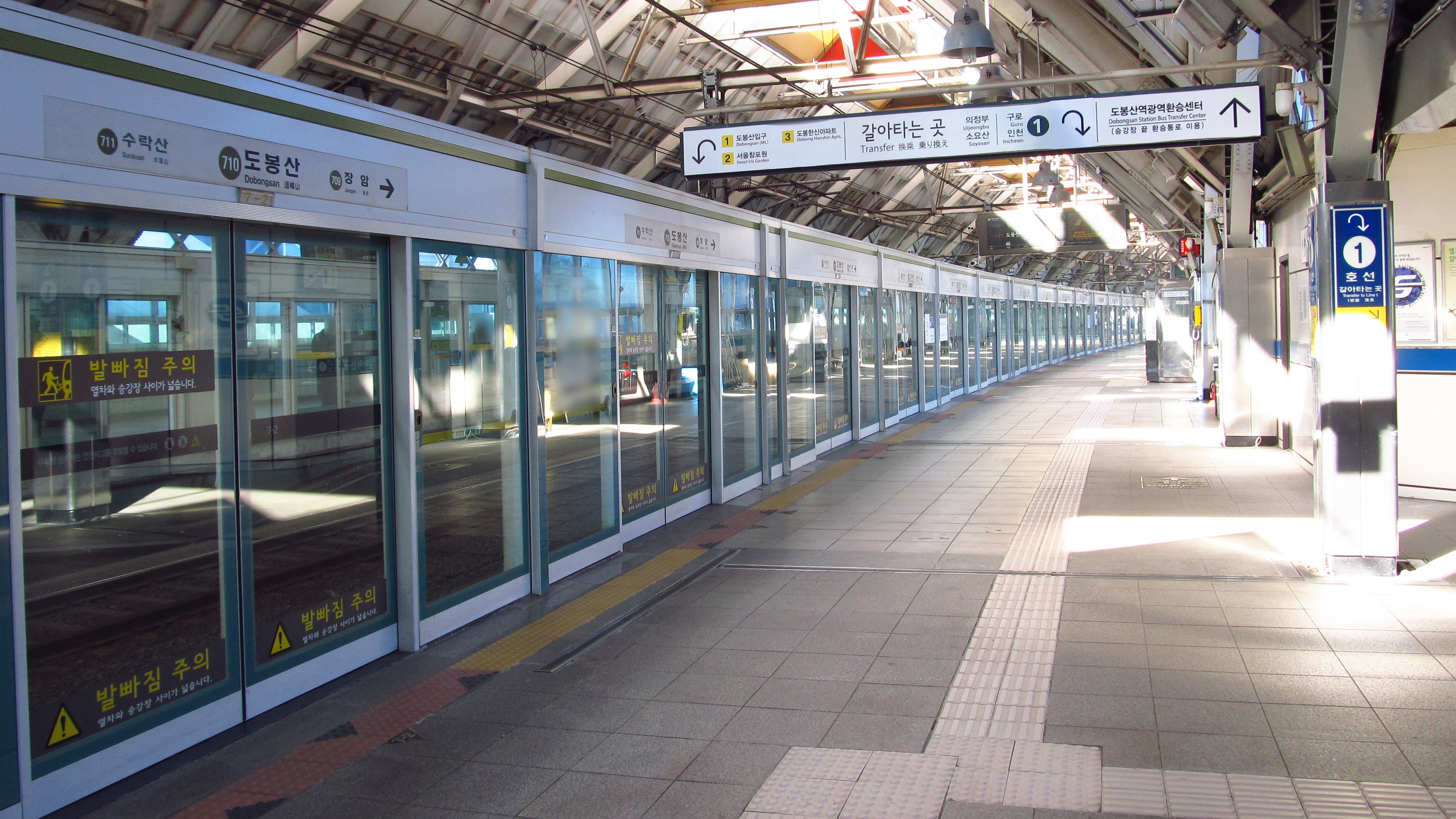
Line 7 platform
