= Gyeongin Railway =

1899–1903 Korean Empire company

Keijin Railway LP
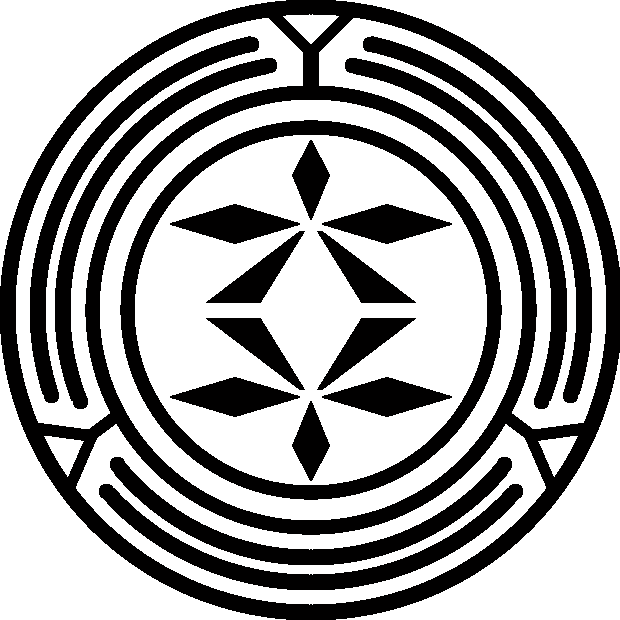
- Native name: 京仁鐵道合資會社 경인철도 합자회사
- Romanized name: Hepburn: Keijin Tetsudō gōshi gaisha RR: Gyeongin Cheoldo Habjahoesa
- Type: Gōshi gaisha (limited partnership)
- Industry: Land transport
- Founded: 15 May 1899
- Defunct: 1 November 1903
- Fate: Absorbed
- Successor: Gyeongbu Railway
- Headquarters: Gyeongseong, Korean Empire
- Area served: Korea (Seoul–Incheon)
- Key people: President: Shibusawa Eiichi
- Services: Passenger & freight railways

The Keijin Railway LP (Japanese: 京仁鐵道合資會社, Keijin Tetsudō gōshi gaisha; Korean: 경인철도 합자회사; RR: Gyeongin Cheoldo Habjahoesa), was a privately owned railway company in the Korean Empire.

It opened the first railway line on the Korean Peninsula, running from Noryangjin, on the shore of the Han River across from Gyeongseong, to Chukhyeon in Incheon, on 18 September 1899. Soon after, on 8 July 1900 the line was extended across the Han River to Gyeongseong.

== History ==
=== Background ===
Although the Korean government had realised the necessity of building a railway, the financial resources needed were lacking, as was the ability to undertake such a project. Although for centuries the Han River had been used to transport goods to and from Seoul, industrial development meant that a new system of mass transportation from the city to the port was needed. The nearest port to Seoul was Jemulpo opened in 1883, and so a railway between the two, referred to as the Gyeongin Railway, was conceived.

In February 1891, King Gojong negotiated a "Railway Construction Treaty" with the American entrepreneur James R. Morse, who had been trying to obtain the construction rights to the Seoul–Jemulpo railway project through Horace Newton Allen, who at the time was secretary of the American legation to Korea. However, in August 1894, under the terms of the "Korea-Japan Joint Interim Provisions", the Japanese government was given the right to build the railway, as the Korean government lacked the necessary funds. Due to the First Sino-Japanese War and the assassination of Empress Myeongseong, support in the Korean government shifted away the pro-Japanese faction to pro-Russian and pro-American figures, on 29 March 1896 the rights to build the Gyeongin Railway were sold to Morse. This was the first patent granted by the Korean government for the construction of a railway, and the first time that American interests received a transfer of rights from Korea. On 17 April Komura Jutarō, resident Japanese minister to Korea, filed a protest with the Korean government claiming that the sale of the railway rights to Morse constituted a violation of the Interim Joint Provisions.

=== Construction ===
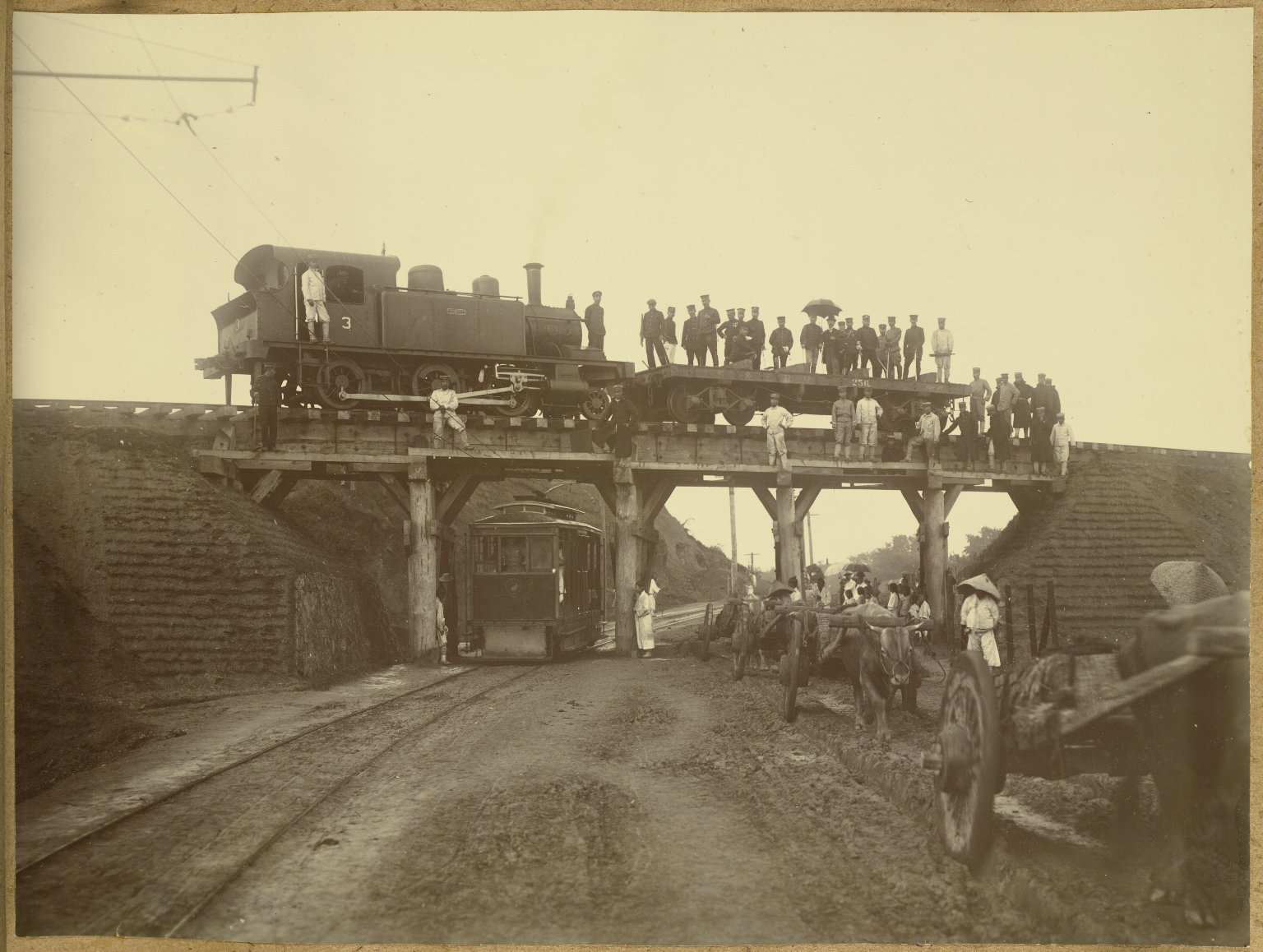
On the Gyeongin Railway in 1903.

The patent granted by the Korean government to Morse stipulated that ground be broken within twelve months of the date the patent application was made, and that construction of the railway be completed within three years. To fulfill the first part of this requirement, construction of the Seoul & Chemulpo Railroad was started on 22 March 1897 after a groundbreaking ceremony held at 9 am that day. In order to reacquire the construction rights, Japanese interests spread rumours about political instability in Korea, leading to the withdrawal of Morse's American investors. On 4 May, the Gyeongin Railway Underwriting Association was formed, and Morse, via Ōkawa Heizaburō (ja), offered to sell the project to Shibusawa Eiichi. Morse later made plans to sell the railway to a French syndicate for 3 million yen, but this deal fell through on 8 March 1898, and finally on 31 October of that year, he agreed to sell the Gyeongin Railway project to the Underwriting Association for 1.8 million yen. After meeting with Morse at the Yokohama Specie Bank, Shibusawa finalised the acquisition of the Gyeongin Railway, and on 15 May the Gyeongin Railway Co. Ltd. (京仁鉄道合資会社, Keijin Tetsudō Gōshigaisha, 경인철도 합자회사 Gyeongin Cheoldo Habjahoesa) was officially established, with Shibusawa as president. The 32.9 km (20.4 mi) line between Noryangjin and Incheon was finally opened on 18 September 1899.

On 1 November 1903, the Gyeongin Railway was acquired and absorbed by the Gyeongbu Railway, which continued operating its line as the Gyeongin Line.

== Network and operations ==
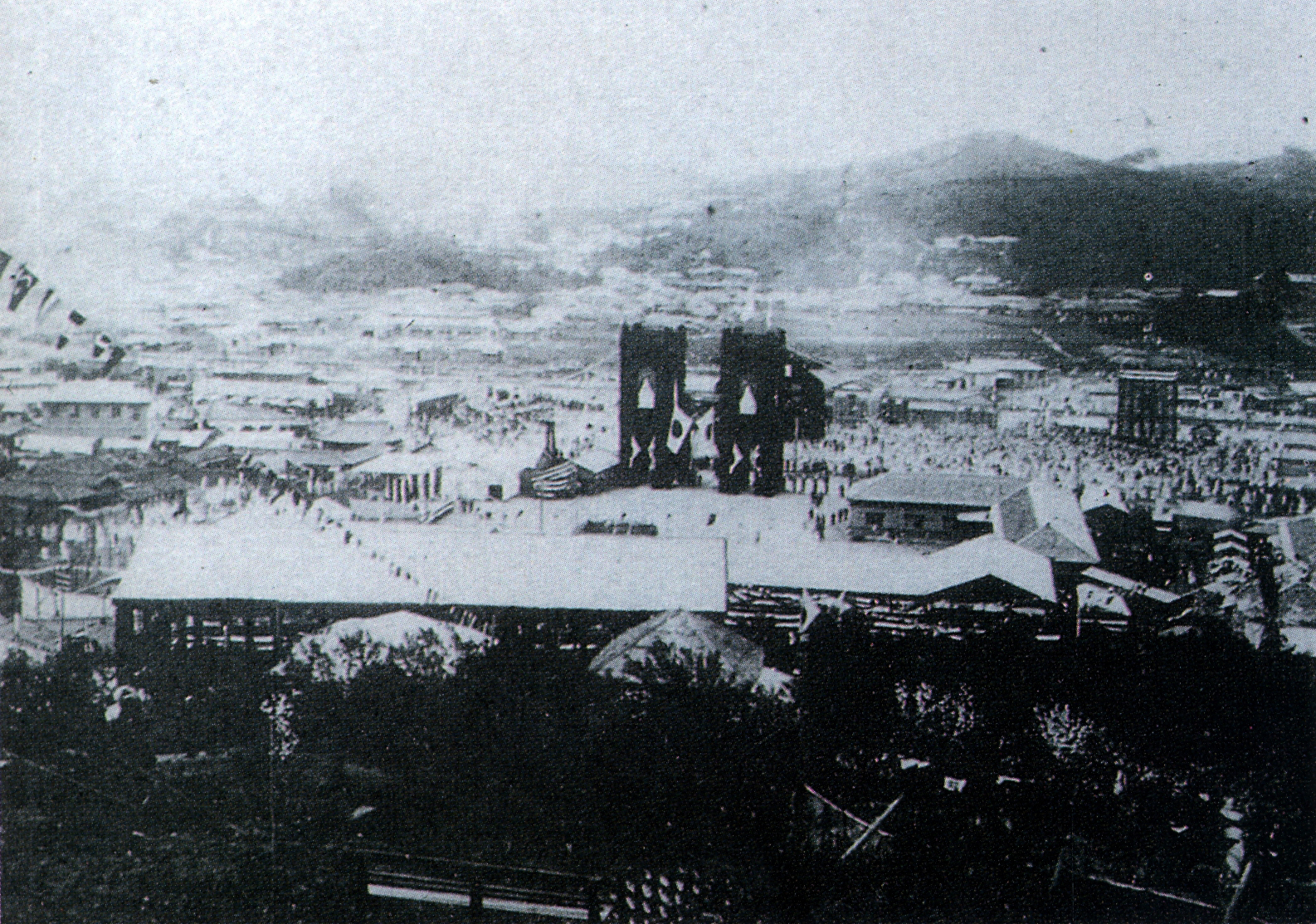
Gyeongin Railway opening ceremony, 18 September 1899.

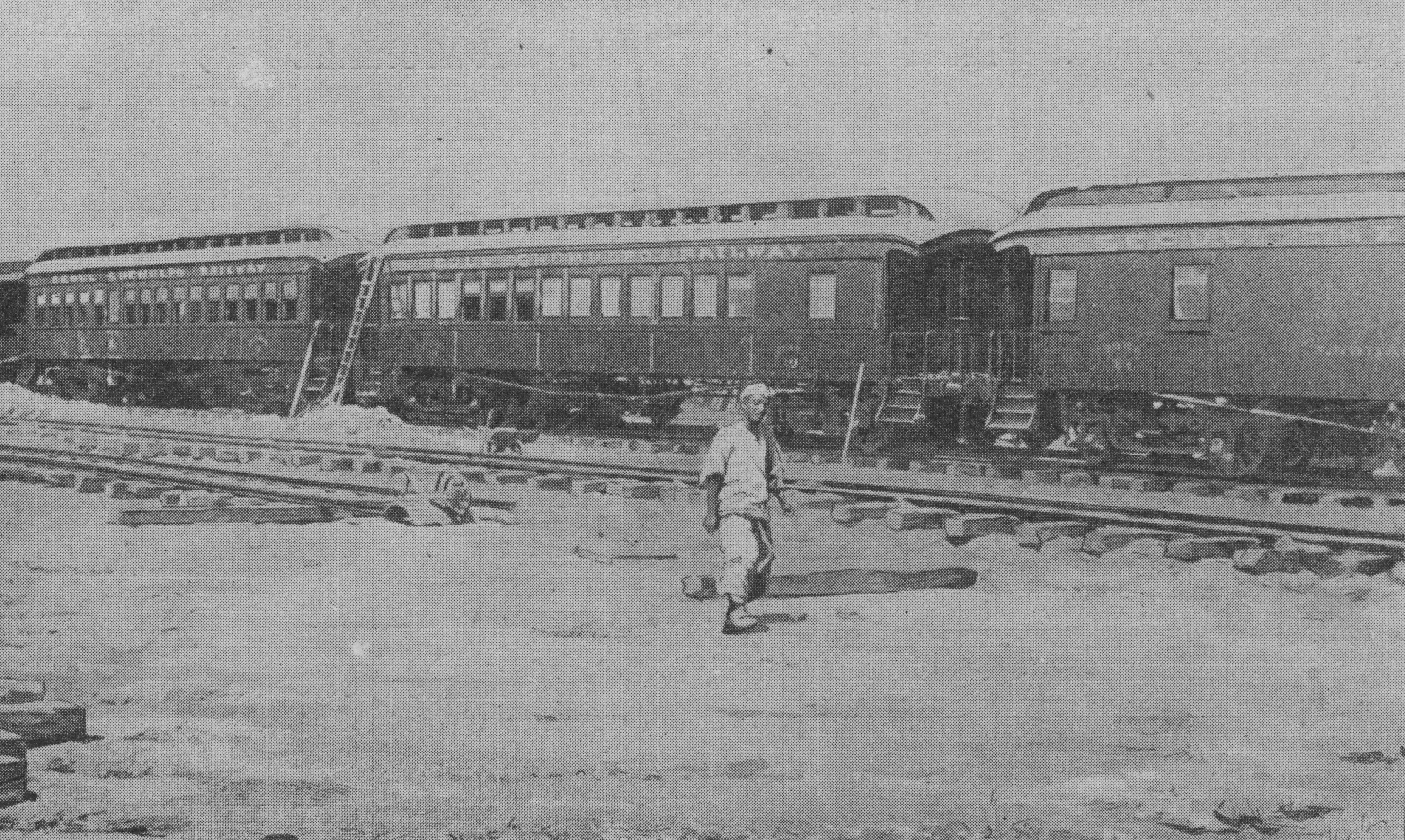
A passenger train of the Gyeongin Railway circa 1899. Note the "Seoul & Chemulpo Railway" lettering.

The Gyeongin Railway's network consisted of a single 38.7 km (24.0 mi) line from Gyeongseong (Seoul) to Incheon, with the first section, from Noryangjin to Incheon, being opened on 18 September 1899, with stations at Incheon, Chukhyeon, Ugakdong, Bupyeong, Sosa, Oryudong, and Noryangjin. On 8 July 1900, a 5.8 km (3.6 mi) extension from Noryangjin to Gyeongseong was opened, and on 12 November of that year, a ceremony commemorating the opening of the complete line was held. The new extension had two new stations, Gyeongseong and Yongsan, and a new station at Yeongdeungpo was added at the same time, between the existing stations of Noryangjin and Oryudong; Yeongdeungpo became the junction point when the Gyeongbu Railway was opened in 1902.

The trip between Noryangjin and Incheon took 1 hour 40 minutes when service began in 1899, and two round trips were operated each day:

Read down ↓		Korean	↑ Read up	
7:00	13:00	Incheon	10:40	16:40
7:06	13:06	Chukhyeon	10:35	16:35
7:11	13:11	Ugakdong	10:30	16:30
7:36	13:36	Bupyeong	10:05	16:05
7:50	13:50	Sosa	9:51	15:51
8:15	14:15	Oryudong	9:33	15:33
8:40	14:40	Noryangjin	9:00	15:00

When the line was opened, the Ministry of Agriculture and Rural Affairs issued the "Gyeongin Railway Regulations", which was the first Korean law regarding railway operations.

== Rolling stock ==
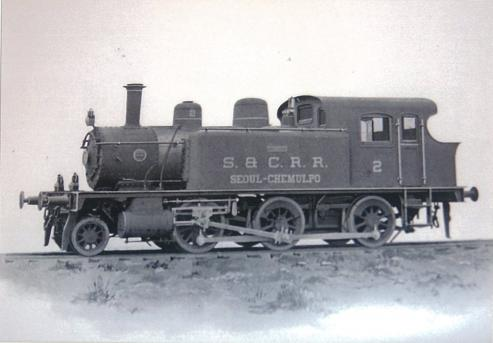
Gyeongin Railway locomotive number 2 as built in 1899 by Brooks. Note the "S. & C. R.R. Seoul–Chemulpo" lettering, which was removed soon after delivery.

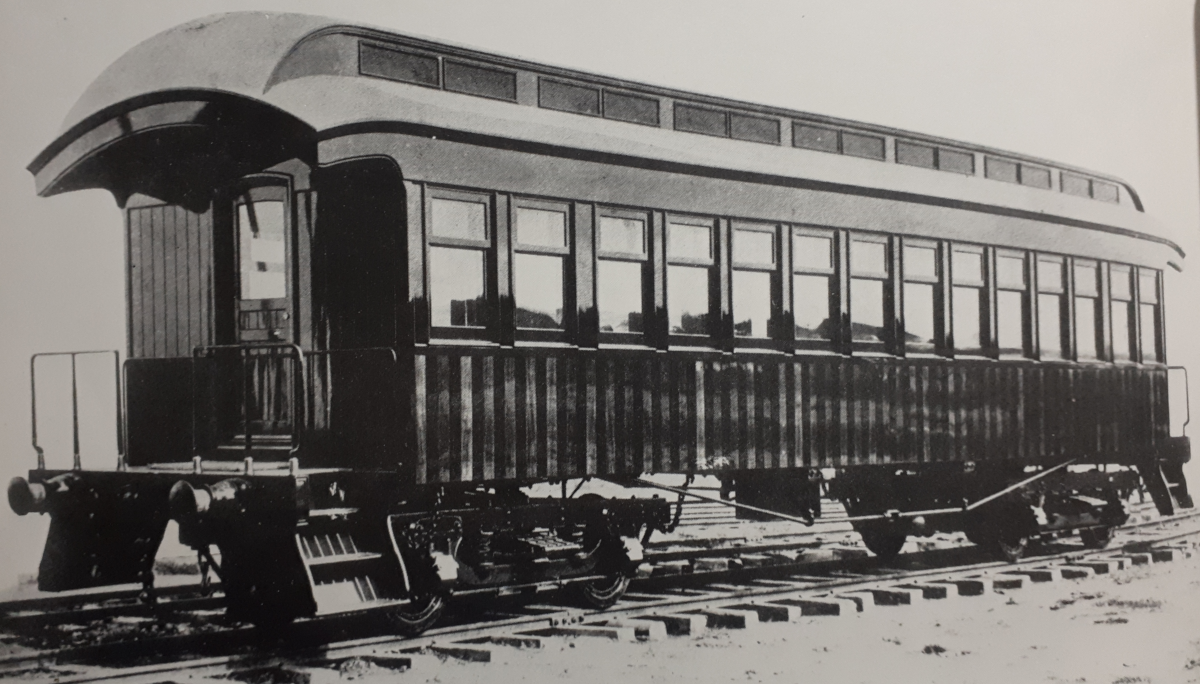
Special carriage for the Emperor of Korea

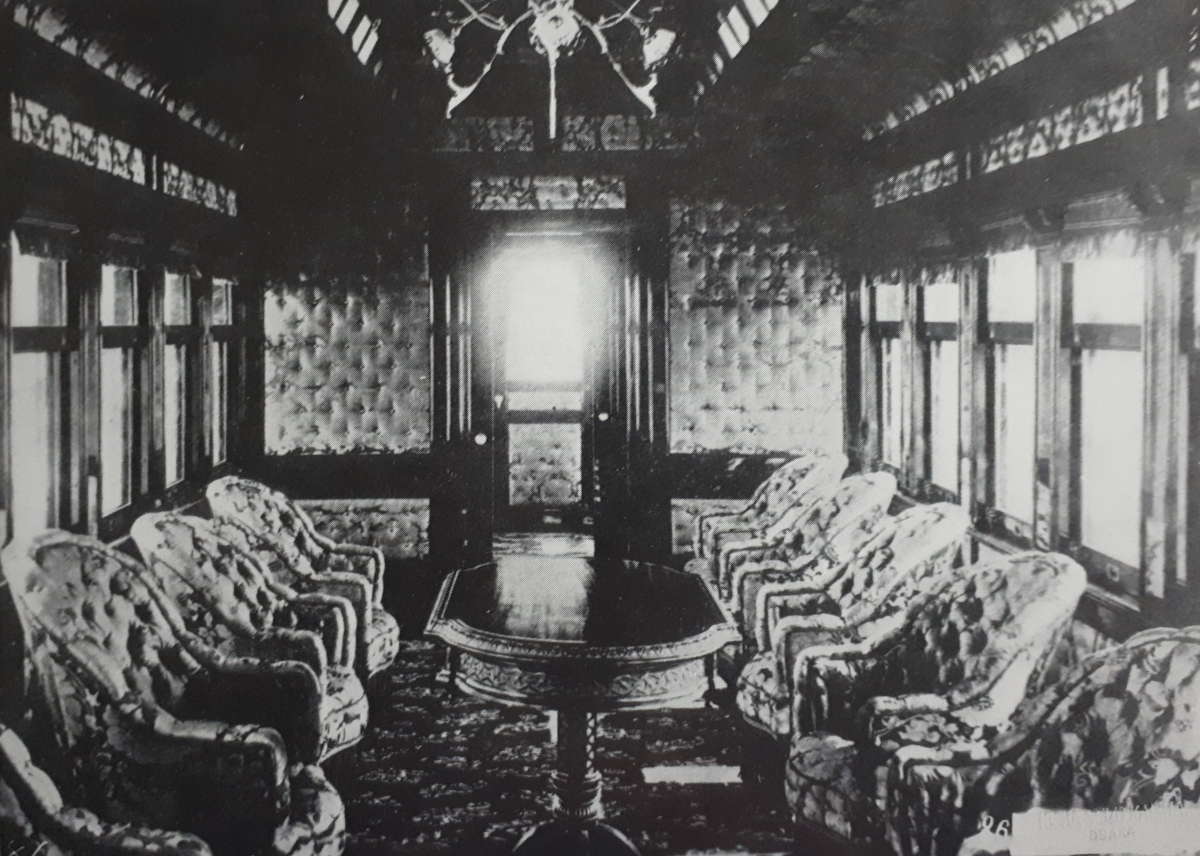
Interior of the imperial carriage

The Gyeongin Railway operated four 2-6-0T steam tank locomotives built by the Brooks Locomotive Works of the United States in 1899. They were delivered in knockdown form on 17 June 1899 and assembled at Incheon. Numbered 1–4, they eventually became the Chosen Government Railway's Mogai-class locomotives.

Passenger and freight cars were likewise purchased from the United States. In 1900, Kisha Seizō of Japan built a special carriage for the Emperor of Korea.
