= Dongam station =

Metro station in Incheon, South Korea

동암; Dongam
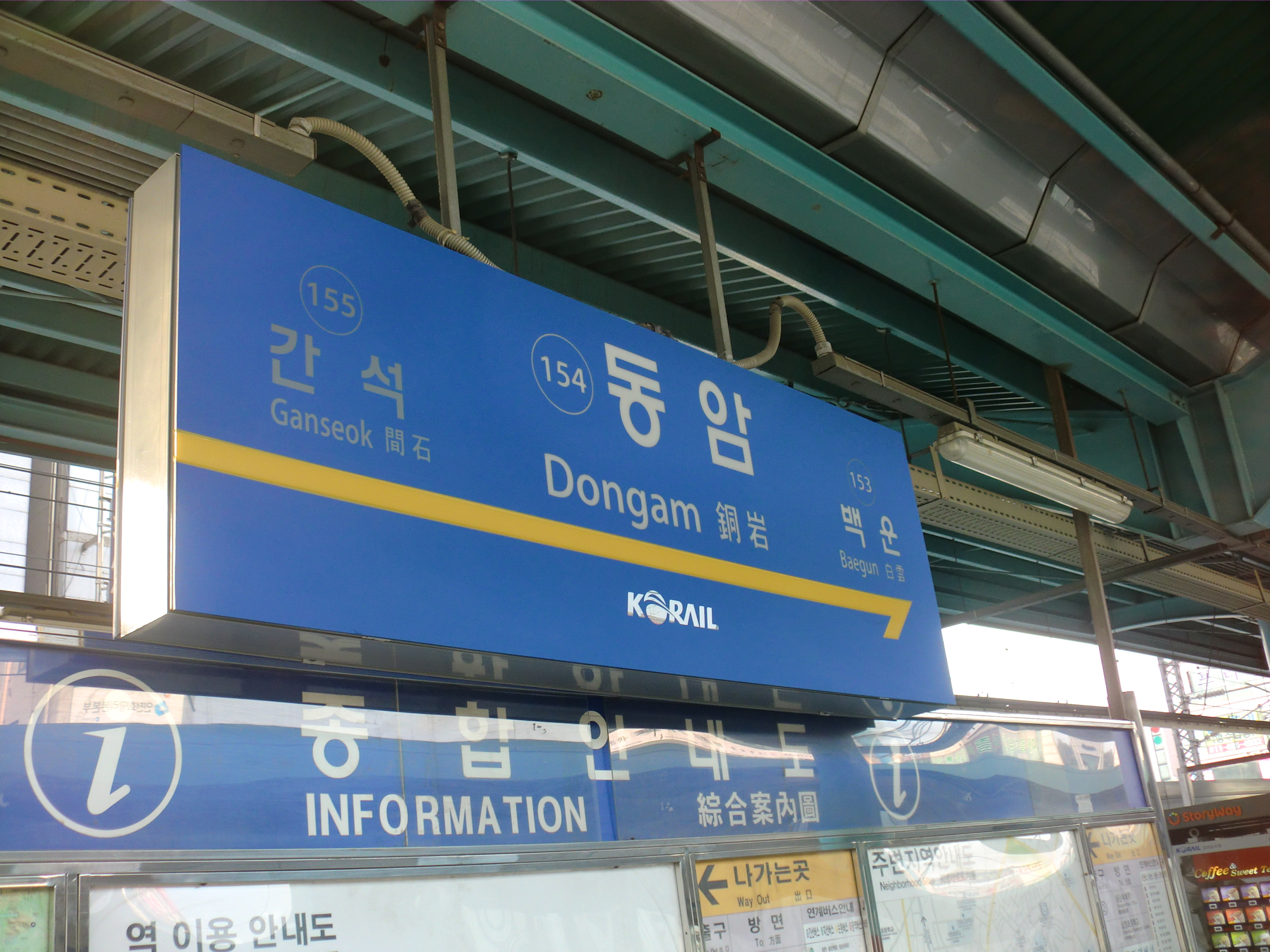

Korean name
- Hangul: 동암역
- Hanja: 銅岩驛
- Revised Romanization: Dongam-yeok
- McCune–Reischauer: Tongam-yŏk

General information
- Location: 474-1 Sipjeong 2-dong, 10 Dongamgwangjangno, Bupyeong-gu, Incheon
- Coordinates: 37°28′18″N 126°42′12″E
- Operator: Korail
- Line: Line 1
- Platforms: 2
- Tracks: 4

Construction
- Structure type: Aboveground

Key dates
- August 15, 1974: Line 1 opened

Passengers
- (Daily) Based on Jan–Dec of 2012. Line 1: 57,302
Location

Dongam Station (Korean: 동암역; Hanja: 銅岩驛; RR: Dongam-yeok) is a station on Seoul Metropolitan Subway Line 1 and Gyeongin Line.

Preceding station	Seoul Metropolitan Subway	Following station
Baegun towards Yeoncheon	Line 1	Ganseok towards Incheon
Baegun towards Dongducheon	Line 1 Gyeongwon Express	Ganseok towards Incheon
Bupyeong towards Yongsan	Line 1 Gyeongin Express	Juan towards Dongincheon
