= Incheon Queer Culture Festival =

Korean LGBT festival

- Hangul: 인천퀴어문화축제
- Hanja: 仁川퀴어文化祝祭
- RR: Incheon kwieo munhwa chukje
- MR: Inch'ŏn k'wiŏ munhwa ch'ukche
- IPA: [intɕʰʌn kʰy.ʌ munɸa tɕʰuk̚t͈ɕe]

Incheon Queer Culture Festival is a sexual minority festival and cultural festival in South Korea. It started on September 8, 2018 in Jung-gu, Incheon Metropolitan City. The second festival was held on August 31, 2019 at Bupyeong Station Bukbu Square. It is also called Inqui for short.

== 1st Festival ==
Although the Dong-gu Office did not permit the location, the police reported the gathering, and there was friction with residents who opposed it and tried to block it. Due to the clash with the opposing side, they were unable to set up booths, and the opposing side also obstructed the setting up of stalls. However, some of the participating groups temporarily set up stalls in the plaza and held the event. The march did not march the entire originally planned route, but only marched a part of it at a slow pace.

=== Progress ===
The organizing committee completed the rally report, planning to hold the Incheon Queer Culture Festival at the Dong Incheon Station North Square and the parade to march around Dong Incheon Station, but the Incheon Metropolitan City Dong-gu Office notified that the event would not be permitted at the Dong Incheon Station Square due to the lack of safety personnel and parking. In response, the organizing committee filed an administrative appeal against the Dong-gu Office's action.

The organizing committee was unable to proceed with the event at the Dong Incheon Station plaza, which was not permitted to be used, and A separate street parade was planned to be held, but the Pride parade, which started from Dong Incheon Station and returned to it, was canceled due to obstruction by those opposing the event, and some participants and equipment were unable to enter the venue. At that time, some members of certain religious groups and believers engaged in physical violence and verbal abuse. Some of those who participated in the protest against the march were booked on charges of obstructing a legally reported assembly.

=== Actions by some Christian groups ===
The Incheon Christian Federation and conservative civic groups, who opposed the festival, scuffled with the police as they tried to enter the venue while wearing black T-shirts that said, "Oppose the Legalization of Homosexuality." They claimed, "If the Queer Festival is held in Incheon this time, it will continue to be held in the future," and "We must block the event." Some church and Christian figures stated that if this sexual minority event is left alone, it will continue to be held, and explained their opposition. However, they did not receive permission to attend the rally.

Some of the protesters stormed the festival site and lay down on the ground as if they were doing a sit-in, blocking the event from proceeding. Some of the organizers and civic activists also scuffled with them. A Queer Culture Festival organizer who participated in the event expressed his opinion, saying, "In the history of the Korean sexual minority movement, this is the first time we have seen such a violent crime scene that was tantamount to lynching." Amid concerns and criticisms of “collective lynching” and “unilateral terrorism” against sexual minorities, the festival organizing committee held an emergency press conference at 2:30 PM on the 10th with 16 solidarity groups and the Rainbow Action Against Discrimination Against Sexual Minorities, and claimed that “the police have consistently been passive and have assisted hate crimes.”

== 2nd Festival ==
It was held on August 31, 2019 at the Northern Plaza of Bupyeong Station. Unlike the first year, the event proceeded without major disruption and participants included even embassies and other institutions.

== See also ==
- Lee Dong-hwan (pastor), whose participation in the festival resulted in his excommunication
- LGBTQ rights in South Korea
