= Baegun station =

Metro station in Incheon, South Korea

Coordinates: 37.48356°N 126.70763°E

백운; Baegun
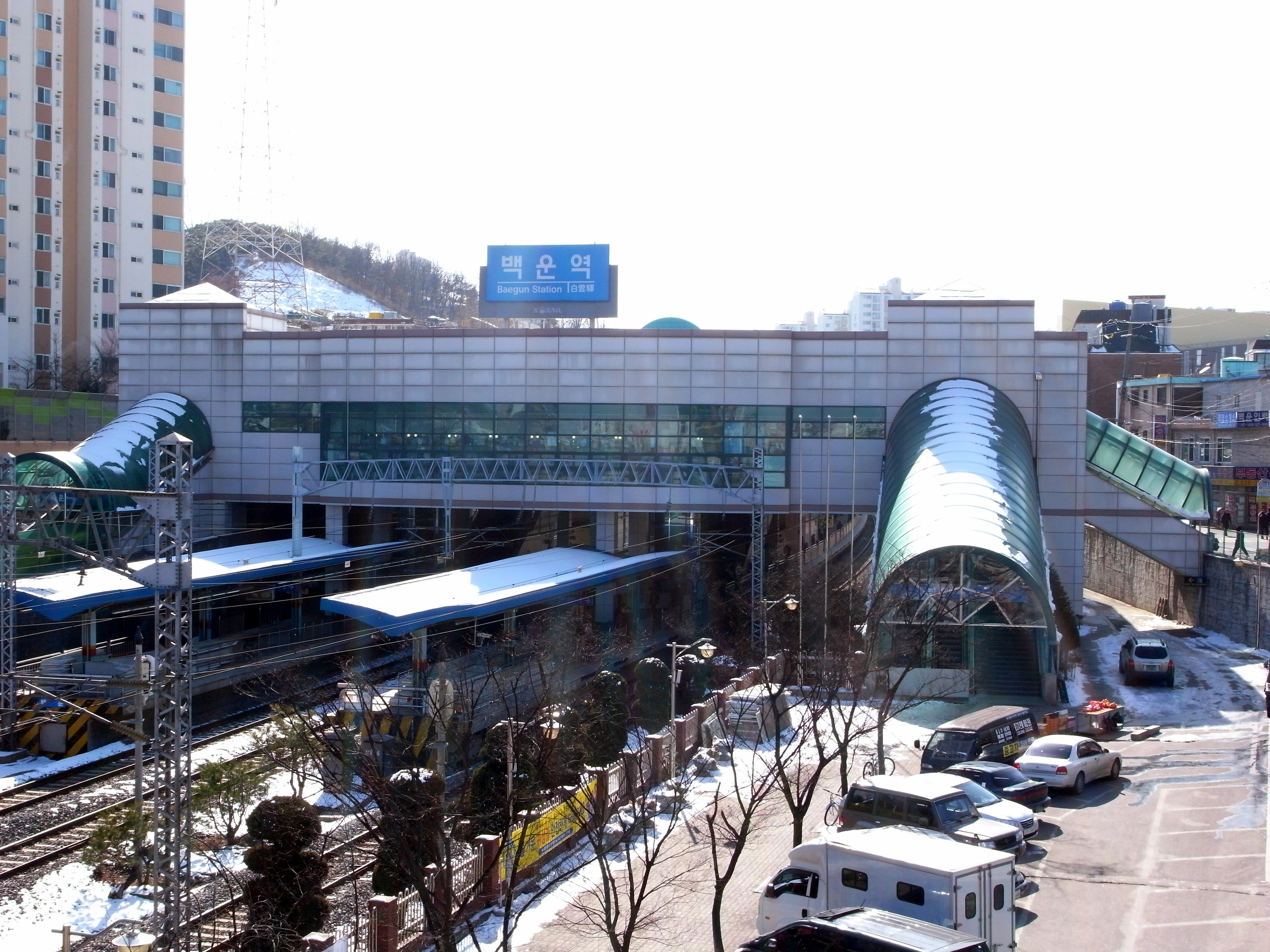

Korean name
- Hangul: 백운역
- Hanja: 白雲驛
- RR: Baegun-yeok
- MR: Paegun-yŏk

General information
- Location: 539 Sipjeong-dong, 14 Majangno 55 Bongil, Bupyeong-gu, Incheon
- Operator: Korail
- Line: Line 1
- Platforms: 2
- Tracks: 4

Construction
- Structure type: Aboveground

Key dates
- November 20, 1984: Line 1 opened

Passengers
- Daily passengers based on Jan–Dec of 2012; Line 1: 19,937
Location

Baegun station (Korean: 백운역; Hanja: 白雲驛; RR: Baegun-yeok) is a subway station on the Seoul Subway Line 1 and the Gyeongin Line.

== Vicinity ==
- Exit 1: Daeju Parkville APT
- Exit 2: Bupyeong Library
- Exit 3: Sinchon Elementary School

Preceding station	Seoul Metropolitan Subway	Following station
Bupyeong towards Soyosan	Line 1	Dongam towards Incheon
Bupyeong towards Dongducheon	Line 1 Gyeongwon Express	Dongam towards Incheon
