= Gimpo Line =

Former freight railway line

- Hangul: 김포선
- Hanja: 金浦線
- RR: Gimposeon
- MR: Kimp'osŏn

The Gimpo Line is a former freight railway line operated by Korean National Railroad that served Gimpo International Airport, southwest of Seoul. The line was a 9.2 km spur line that terminated near the airport and connected to the Gyeongin Line (Seoul Subway Line 1) at Bucheon Station. The line was opened on August 20, 1951 primarily to transport US military materiel, fuel and munitions and closed on August 10, 1980 due to competition by road freight transport.

== Stations ==
Bucheon - Yakdae - Gimpo (not to be confused with Gimpo International Airport Station)

== See also ==
- Transportation in South Korea
- Seohae Line
