= Sentetsu Mogai-class locomotive =

Class of 4 Korean 2-6-0T locomotives

Chosen Government Railway Mogai class (モガイ) Gyeongin Railway 1–4 Gyeongbu Railway 100 series Korean National Railroad Moga1 class (모가1) Korean State Railway Mogaha class (모가하)
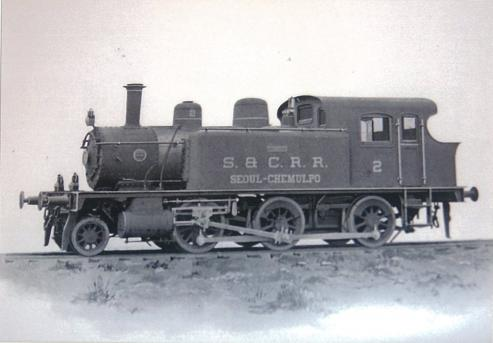
- Gyeongin Railway number 2 as built in 1899 by Brooks. Note the "S. & C. R.R. Seoul–Chemulpo" lettering, which was removed soon after delivery.
Type and origin
- Power type: Steam
- Builder: Brooks Locomotive Works
- Build date: 1899
- Total produced: 4
Specifications
- Configuration
  - Whyte: 2-6-0
- Gauge: 1,435 mm (4 ft 8 1/2 in)
- Driver dia.: 1,070 mm (42 in)
- Length: 9,132 mm (359.5 in)
- Width: 2,642 mm (104.0 in)
- Height: 3,405 mm (134.1 in)
- Axle load: est. 5 t (4.9 long tons)
- Adhesive weight: 29.45 t (28.98 long tons)
- Loco weight: 34.3 t (33.8 long tons)
- Fuel type: Coal
- Fuel capacity: 1.36 t (1.34 long tons)
- Water cap.: 3.63 m^{3} (960 US gal)
- Firebox
  - Grate area: 1.21 m^{2} (13.0 sq ft)
- Boiler
  - Small tubes: 122 x 51 mm (2.0 in)
- Boiler pressure: 10.0 kgf/cm^{2} (142 psi)
- Heating surface
  - Firebox: 6.6 m^{2} (71 sq ft)
  - Tubes: 52.6 m^{2} (566 sq ft)
  - Total surface: 59.2 m^{2} (637 sq ft)
- Cylinders: 2
- Cylinder size: 350 mm × 560 mm (14 in × 22 in)
- Valve gear: Stephenson
Performance figures
- Maximum speed: 55 km/h (34 mph)
- Tractive effort: 53.4 kN (12,000 lb_{f})
Career
- Operators: Gyeongin Railway (1899–1903); Gyeongbu Railway (1903–1906); Chosen Government Railway (1906–1945); Korean National Railroad (1945–); Korean State Railway (1945–)
- Class: Sentetsu: モガイ; KNR: 모가1; KSR: 모가하
- Number in class: 4
- Numbers: Gyeongin/Gyeongbu: 1–4; Sentetsu: モガイ1–モガイ4
- Delivered: 17 June 1899
- Withdrawn: 1930s?

The Mogai class (モガイ) was a class of steam tank locomotives of the Chosen Government Railway (Sentetsu) with 2-6-0 wheel arrangement. The "Moga" name came from the American naming system for steam locomotives, under which locomotives with 2-6-0 wheel arrangement were called "Mogul". The Moga class was the first type of steam locomotive in Korea, introduced by the Gyeongin Railway in 1899 for use on the Incheon—Noryangjin line.

== Description ==
The Mogai-class locomotives were tank locomotives with one leading axle and three powered axles, carrying water and coal without a tender. The axle load is estimated to have been around 5 tons per axle. It was quickly found insufficient, and no further locomotives of the same wheel arrangement were introduced.

Four 2-6-0T tank locomotives were built for the Seoul & Chemulpo Railway - the English name of the Gyeongin Railway - by the Brooks Locomotive Works in the United States, and were shipped to Korea disassembled and assembled at Incheon on 17 June 1899. Numbered 1–4, they were originally built with buffers-and-chain couplers, but these were replaced with Janney couplers around 1904–1905. The Gyeongin Railway was acquired by the Gyeongbu Railway in 1903, which renumbered them 101–104; they were later transferred to Sentetsu after the nationalisation of the Gyeongbu Railway in 1906, and were used as general purpose locomotives until eventually being replaced by the Sentetsu Pure class locomotives. In 1918 they were designated モガ (Moga) class by Sentetsu, retaining their Gyeongbu Railway numbers as モガ101 – モガ194, and Sentetsu's 1938 reclassification became モガイ (Mogai) class モガイ1 through モガイ4.

Although said to have been retired in the 1930s, they were nevertheless accounted for in the 1947 division of Sentetsu assets between North and South Korea, with three going to the Korean National Railroad in the South and one to the Korean State Railway in the North.

== Gallery ==
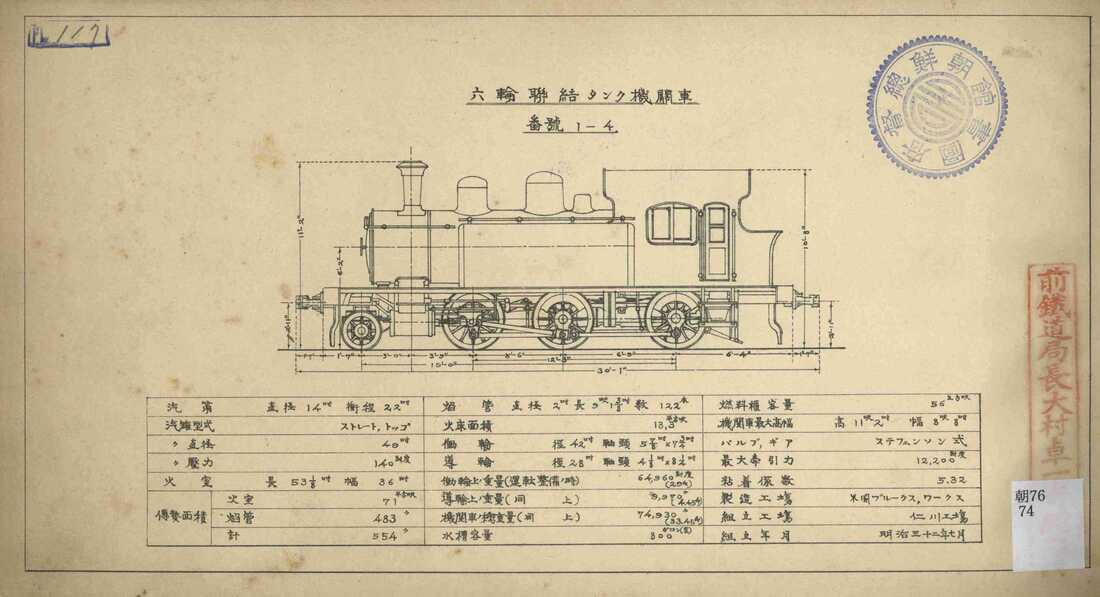
Blueprint of the Mogai class locomotive

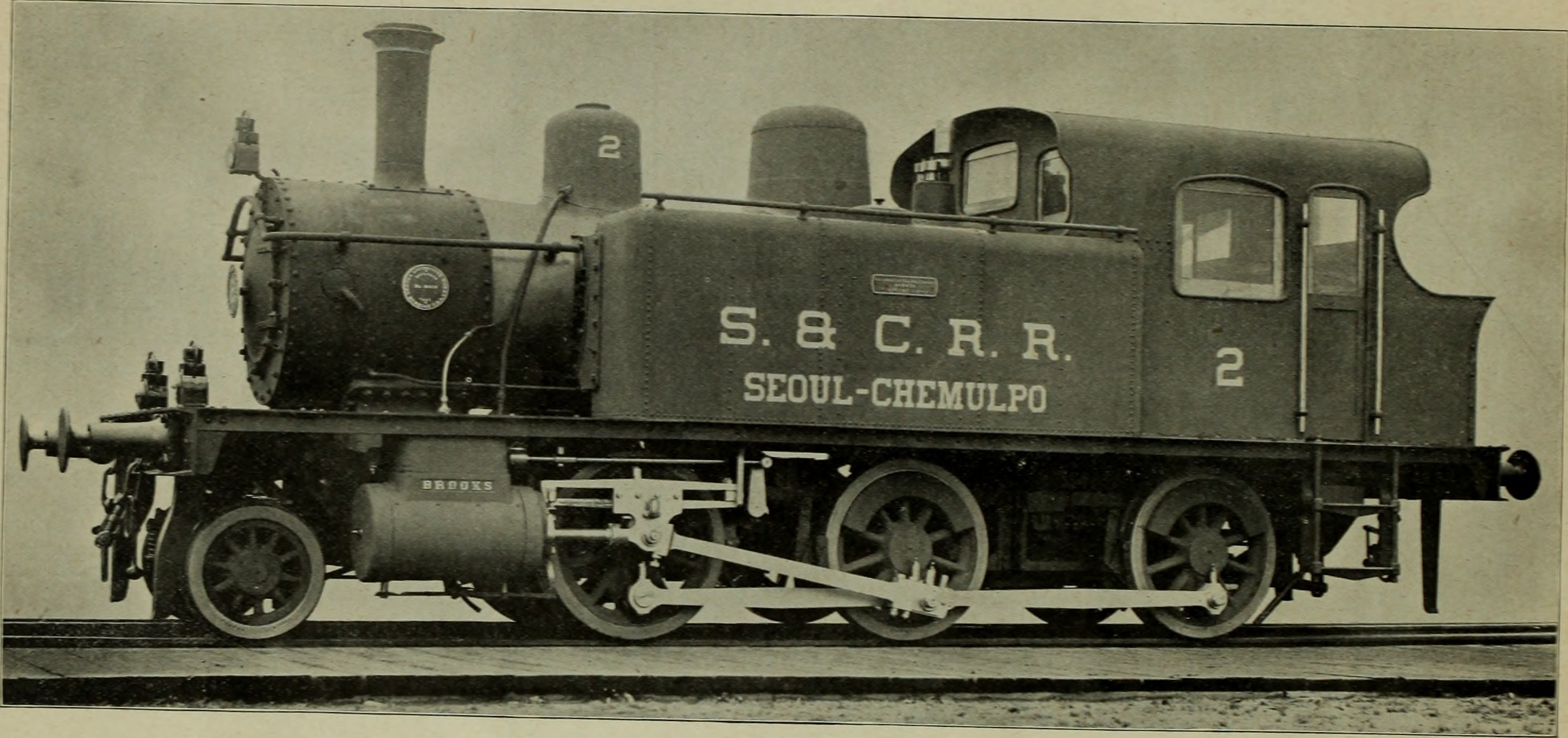
Gyeongin Railway number 2 (better quality)

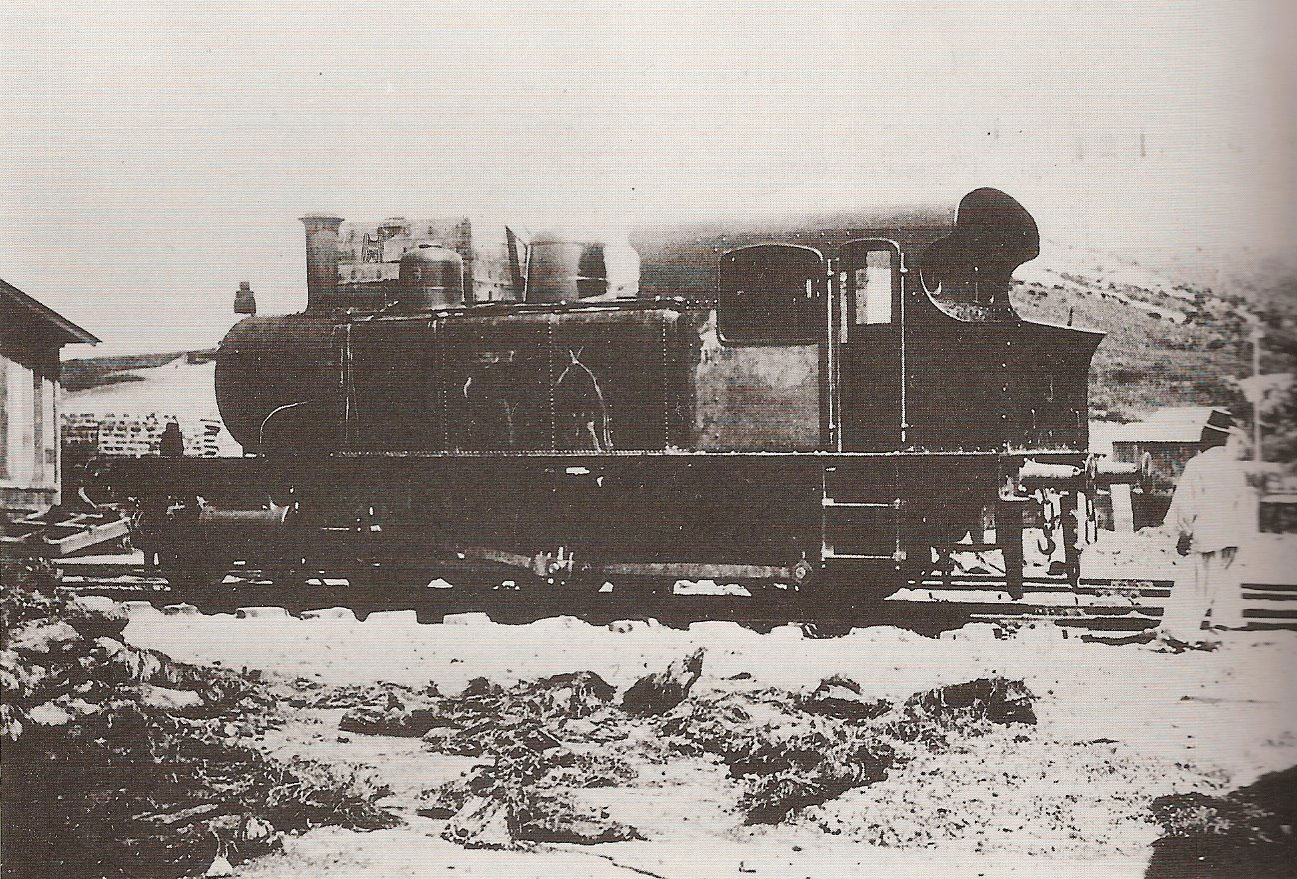
Mogai class locomotive in Korea in 1906. Note the buffers-and-chain coupler.

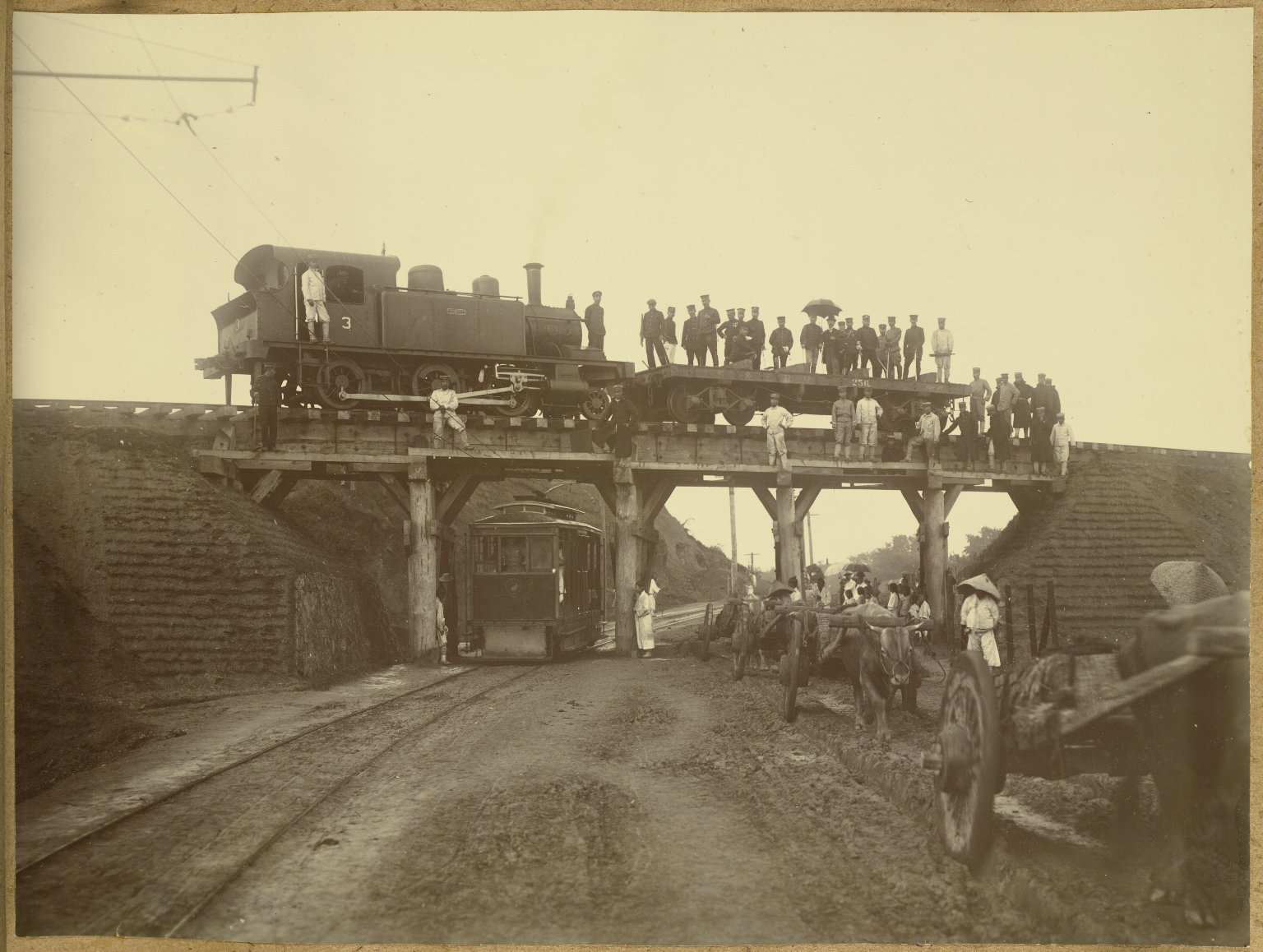
The picture shows the modernized old Korea. King 'Kojong' believed that the new western technology such as electricity, streetcars, gold mining, and railroads could made the nation wealthy and strong. The location is probably at the outskirts of Seoul, where the new tramcar was installed in 1899.

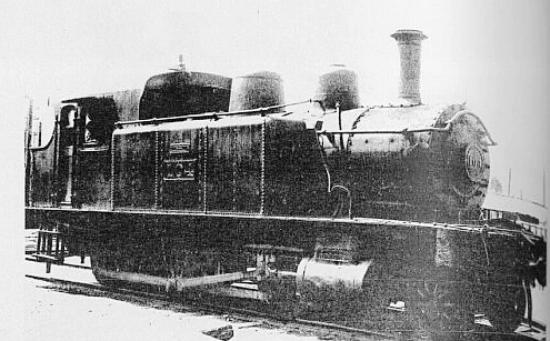
Moga class locomotive number 104 of the Chosen Government Railway around 1906.
