= Bucheon station =

Metro station in Bucheon, South Korea

Coordinates: 37.48396°N 126.78266°E

| 부천 (부천대학교); Bucheon (Bucheon Univ.) |
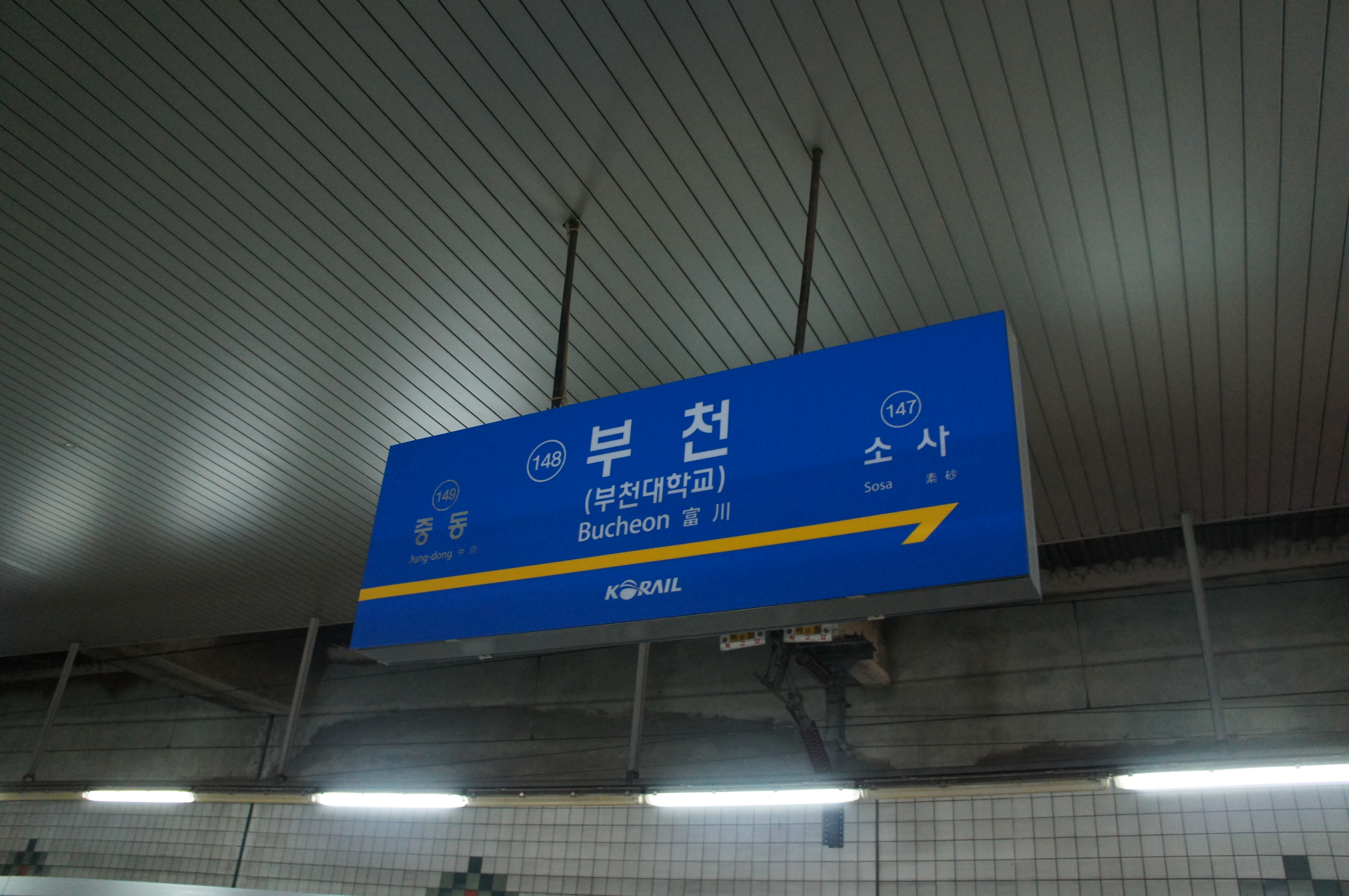
- Station Sign

Korean name
- Hangul: 부천역
- Hanja: 富川驛
- Revised Romanization: Bucheon-yeok
- McCune–Reischauer: Puch'ŏn-yŏk

General information
- Location: 316-2 Simgokbon-dong, 1 Bucheonno, Sosa-gu, Bucheon-si, Gyeonggi-do
- Operator: Korail
- Line: Gyeongin Line
- Platforms: 2
- Tracks: 4

Construction
- Structure type: Aboveground

History
- Opened: September 18, 1899; August 15, 1974

Passengers
- (Daily) Based on Jan-Dec of 2012. Line 1: 105,399
Services
| Preceding station | Seoul Metropolitan Subway | Following station |
|---|---|---|
| Sosa towards Soyosan | Line 1 | Jung-dong towards Incheon |
| Sosa towards Dongducheon | Line 1 Gyeongwon Express | Jung-dong towards Incheon |
| Yeokgok towards Yongsan | Line 1 Gyeongin Express | Songnae towards Dongincheon |
Location

Bucheon station (Korean: 부천 (부천대); RR: Bucheon-yeok) is a ground level metro station located in Bucheon, South Korea. This station is on Seoul Subway Line 1. It was also once the southern terminus of the Gimpo Line, until its abandonment in 1980.

An E-Mart is located in the station itself. On the north side of the station there is a plethora of restaurants, bars, and pojang-macha (street food) stalls. To the south of the station there are bus stops for buses departing to Siheung.
