= Songnae station =

Metro station in Bucheon, South Korea

송내; Songnae
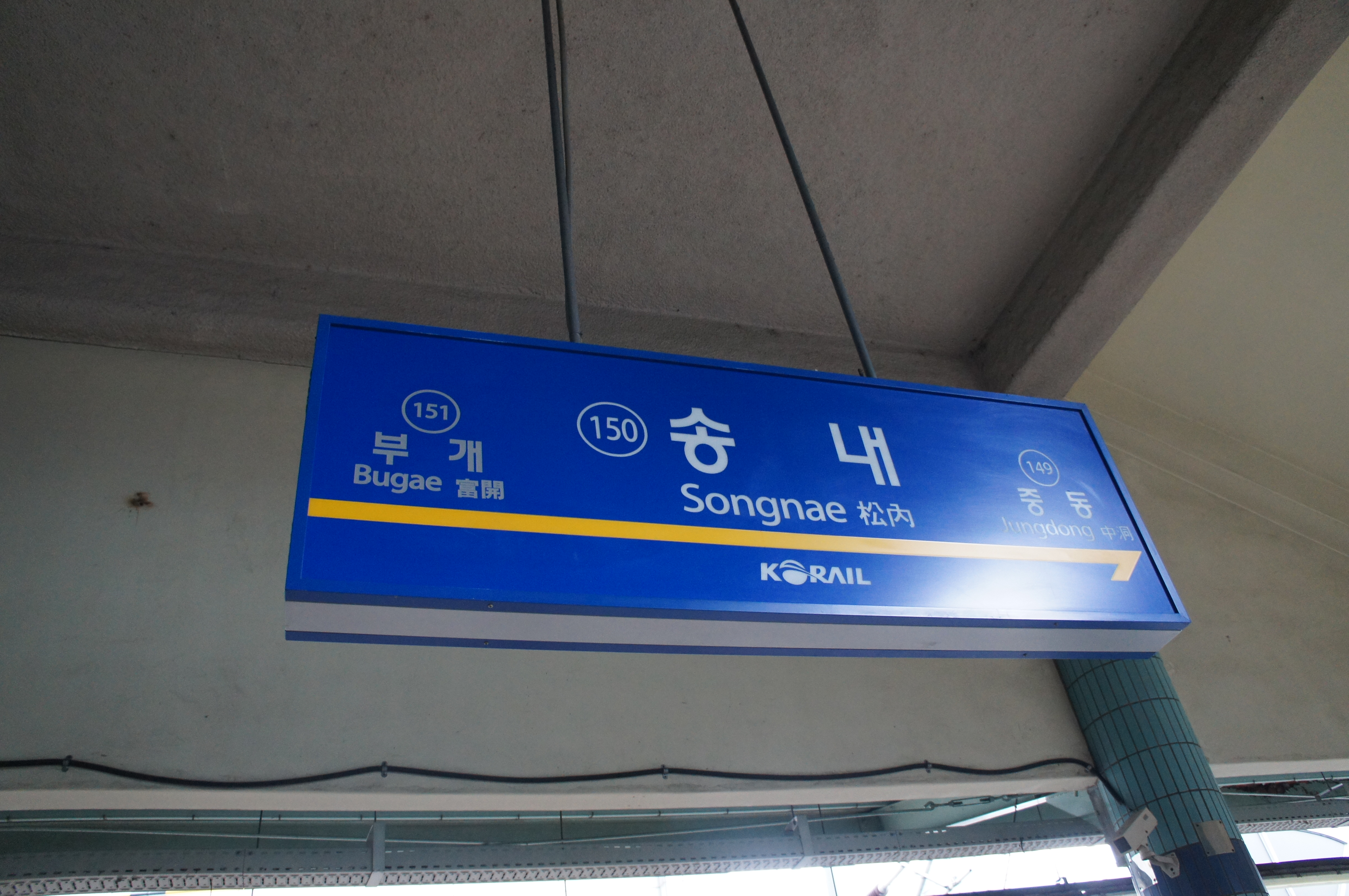

Korean name
- Hangul: 송내역
- Hanja: 松內驛
- Revised Romanization: Songnae-yeok
- McCune–Reischauer: Songnae-yŏk

General information
- Location: 632-4 Songnae-dong, 43 Songnaedaero, Sosa-gu, Bucheon-si, Gyeonggi-do
- Coordinates: 37°29′15″N 126°45′10″E
- Operated by: Korail
- Line(s): Line 1
- Platforms: 2
- Tracks: 4

Construction
- Structure type: Aboveground

Key dates
- August 15, 1974: Line 1 opened

Passengers
- (Daily) Based on Jan-Dec of 2012. Line 1: 94,963

Songnae Station (Korean: 송내역; Hanja: 松內驛; RR: Songnae-yeok) is a station on Seoul Subway Line 1. It is an above-ground station located in the city of Bucheon, South Korea. It provides access to many restaurants and other services, including the Toona Shopping Center.

Preceding station	Seoul Metropolitan Subway	Following station
Jung-dong towards Soyosan	Line 1	Bugae towards Incheon
Jung-dong towards Dongducheon	Line 1 Gyeongwon Express	Bugae towards Incheon
Bucheon towards Yongsan	Line 1 Gyeongin Express	Bupyeong towards Dongincheon
