= Ganseok station =

Metro station in Incheon, South Korea

Coordinates: 37.46469°N 126.69407°E

간석; Ganseok
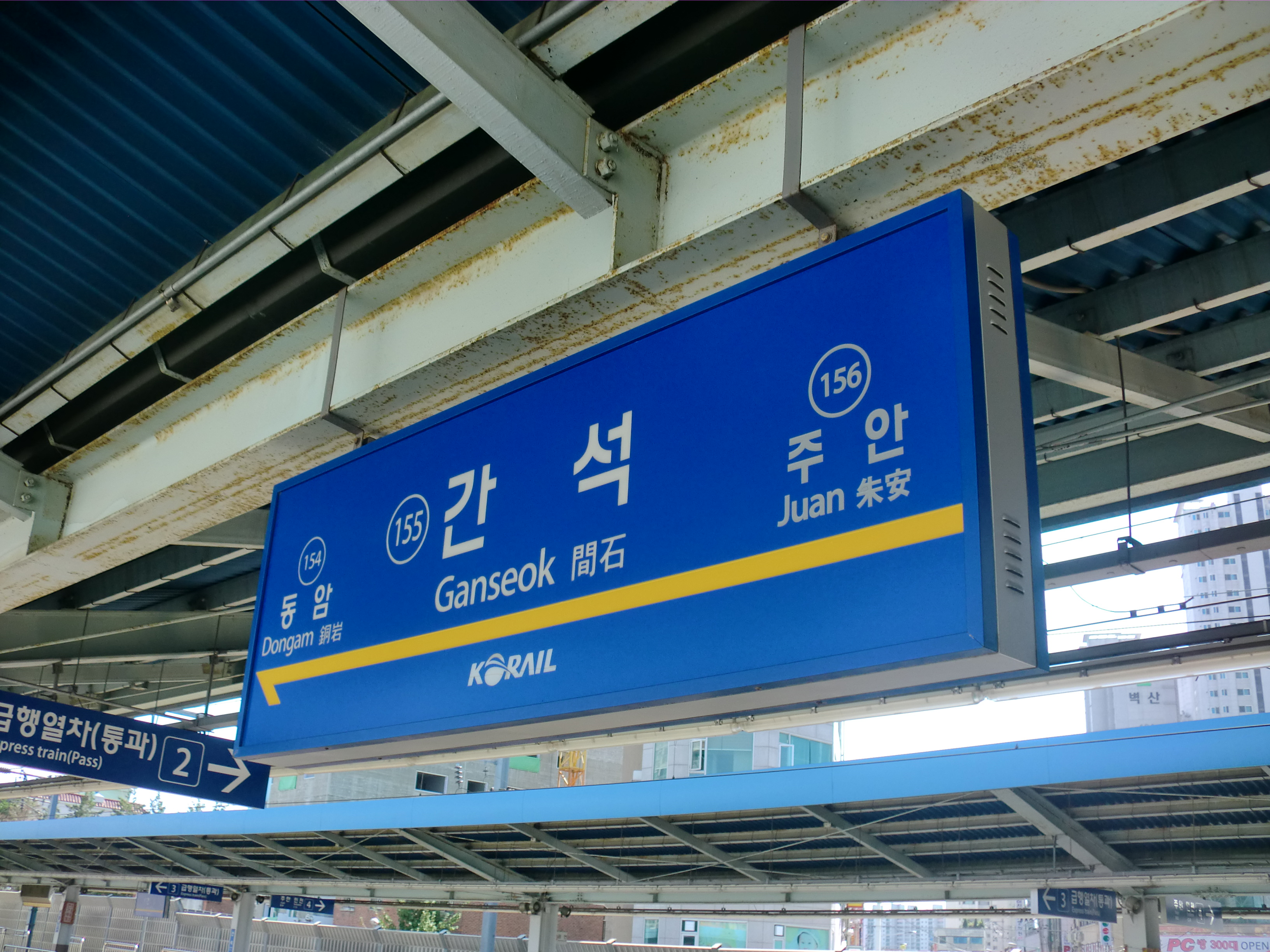

Korean name
- Hangul: 간석역
- Hanja: 間石驛
- Revised Romanization: Ganseok-yeok
- McCune–Reischauer: Kansŏk-yŏk

General information
- Location: 762-25 Ganseok 4-dong, 522-14 Seokjeongno, Namdong-gu, Incheon
- Operator: Korail
- Line: Line 1
- Platforms: 2
- Tracks: 4

Construction
- Structure type: Aboveground

Key dates
- July 11, 1994: Line 1 opened

Passengers
- (Daily) Based on Jan-Dec of 2012. Line 1: 13,830
Location

Ganseok Station (Korean: 간석역; Hanja: 間石驛; RR: Ganseok-yeok) is a station on Seoul Metropolitan Subway Line 1 and Gyeongin Line.

Preceding station	Seoul Metropolitan Subway	Following station
Dongam towards Soyosan	Line 1	Juan towards Incheon
Dongam towards Dongducheon	Line 1 Gyeongwon Express	Juan towards Incheon
