= Jung-dong station =

Jung-dong station (Korean: 중동역; Hanja: 中洞驛) is a railroad station in South Korea.

- Jung-dong station (Bucheon)
- Jung-dong station (Busan Metro)
