= Bugae station =

Metro station in Incheon, South Korea

Coordinates: 37.48858°N 126.74061°E

부개; Bugae
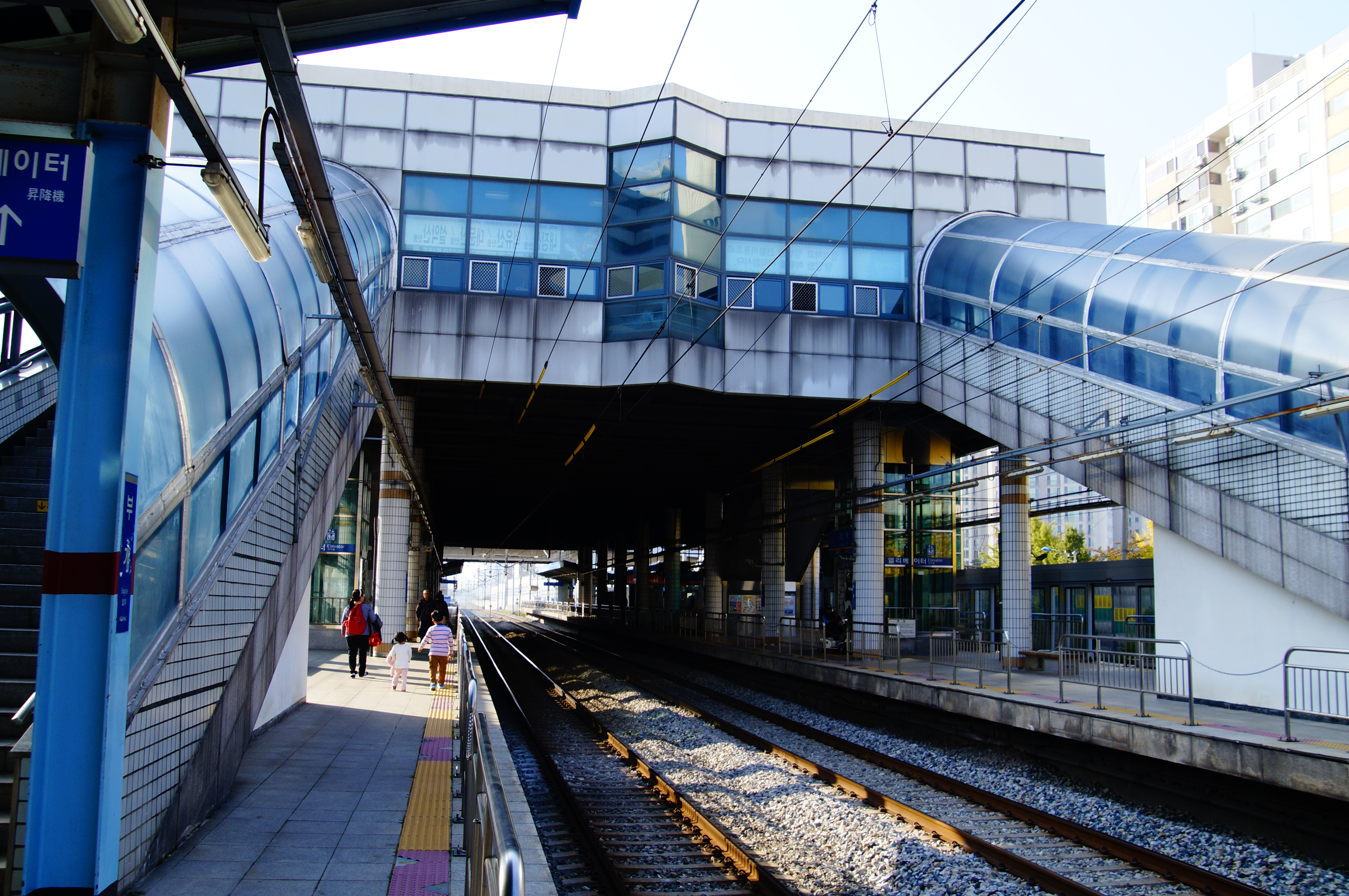
- Station platforms

Korean name
- Hangul: 부개역
- Hanja: 富開驛
- Revised Romanization: Bugae-yeok
- McCune–Reischauer: Pugae-yŏk

General information
- Location: 468 Bugae-dong, 22 Subyeonno, Bupyeong-gu, Incheon
- Operator: Korail
- Line: Line 1
- Platforms: 2
- Tracks: 4

Construction
- Structure type: Aboveground

Key dates
- March 25, 1996: Line 1 opened

Passengers
- (Daily) Based on Jan-Dec of 2012. Line 1: 25,720
Location

Bugae Station (Korean: 부개역; Hanja: 富開驛; RR: Bugae-yeok) is a subway station located in Bupyeong District, Incheon, South Korea. This station is on the Seoul Subway Line 1.

== Vicinity ==
- Exit 1: Bugae Elementary School
- Exit 2: Bugae High School

Preceding station	Seoul Metropolitan Subway	Following station
Songnae towards Soyosan	Line 1	Bupyeong towards Incheon
Songnae towards Dongducheon	Line 1 Gyeongwon Express	Bupyeong towards Incheon
