= Jung-dong station (Bucheon) =

Metro station in Bucheon, South Korea

중동; Jung-dong
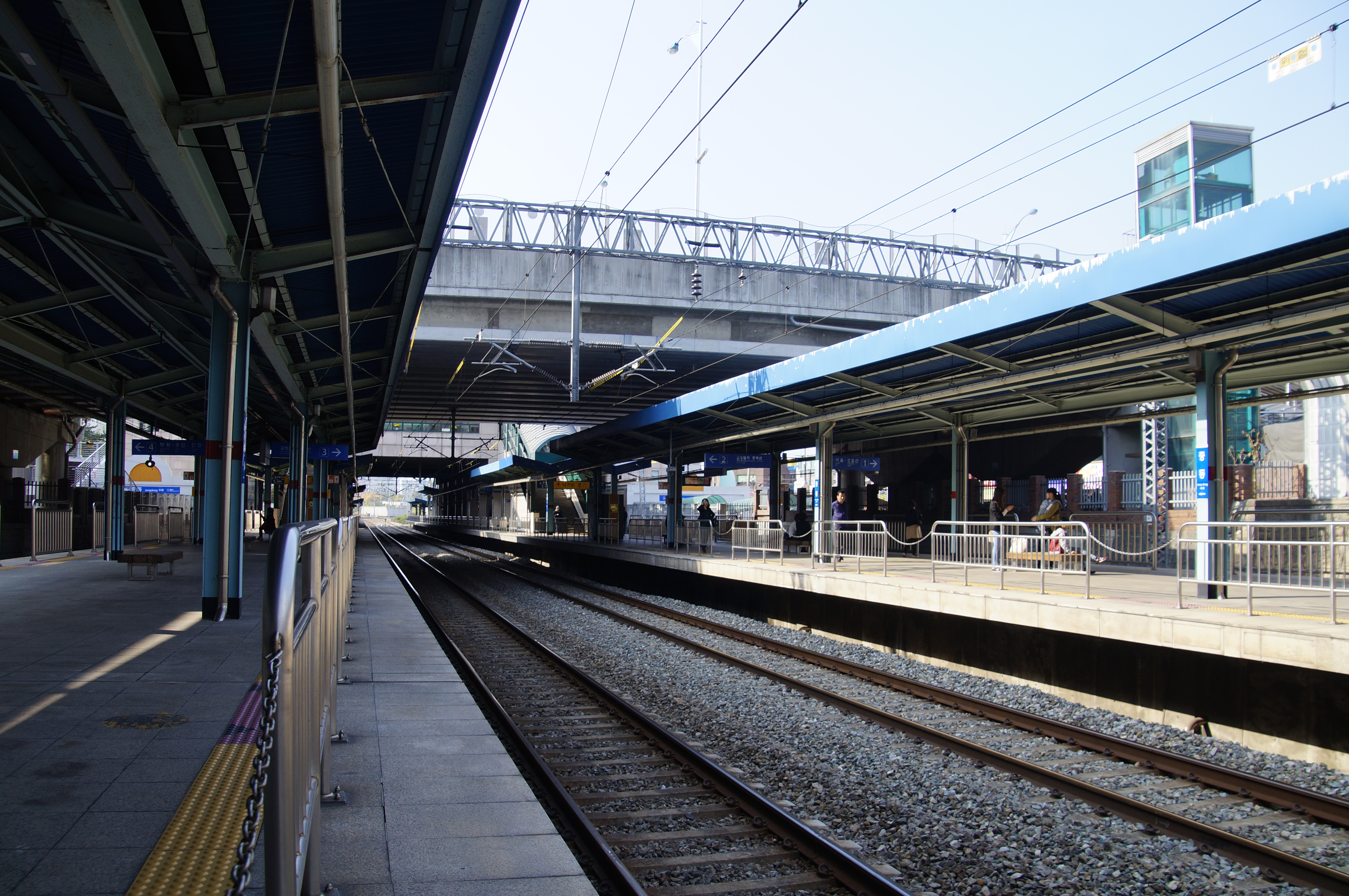
- Station platforms

Korean name
- Hangul: 중동역
- Hanja: 中洞驛
- Revised Romanization: Jungdong-yeok
- McCune–Reischauer: Chungdong-yŏk

General information
- Location: 632 Songnae 2-dong, 73 Jungdongno, Sosa-gu, Bucheon-si, Gyeonggi Province
- Coordinates: 37°29′12″N 126°45′52″E
- Operated by: Korail
- Line(s): Gyeongin Line
- Platforms: 2
- Tracks: 4

Construction
- Structure type: Aboveground

History
- Opened: December 31, 1987

Passengers
- (Daily) Based on Jan-Dec of 2012. Line 1: 22,325

Services
Preceding station	Seoul Metropolitan Subway	Following station
Bucheon towards Soyosan	Line 1	Songnae towards Incheon
Bucheon towards Dongducheon	Line 1 Gyeongwon Express	Songnae towards Incheon

Jung-dong station (Korean: 중동역; Hanja: 中洞驛; RR: Jungdong-yeok) is a station on Seoul Subway Line 1 and the Gyeongin Line.

== Vicinity ==
- Exit 1 : Bucheon High & Girls' Middle Schools
- Exit 2 : Jungdong APT, Bucheon Middle & Girls' High Schools
