= Dowon station =

Metro station in Incheon, South Korea

Coordinates: 37°28′7.23″N 126°38′32.33″E

도원; Dowon
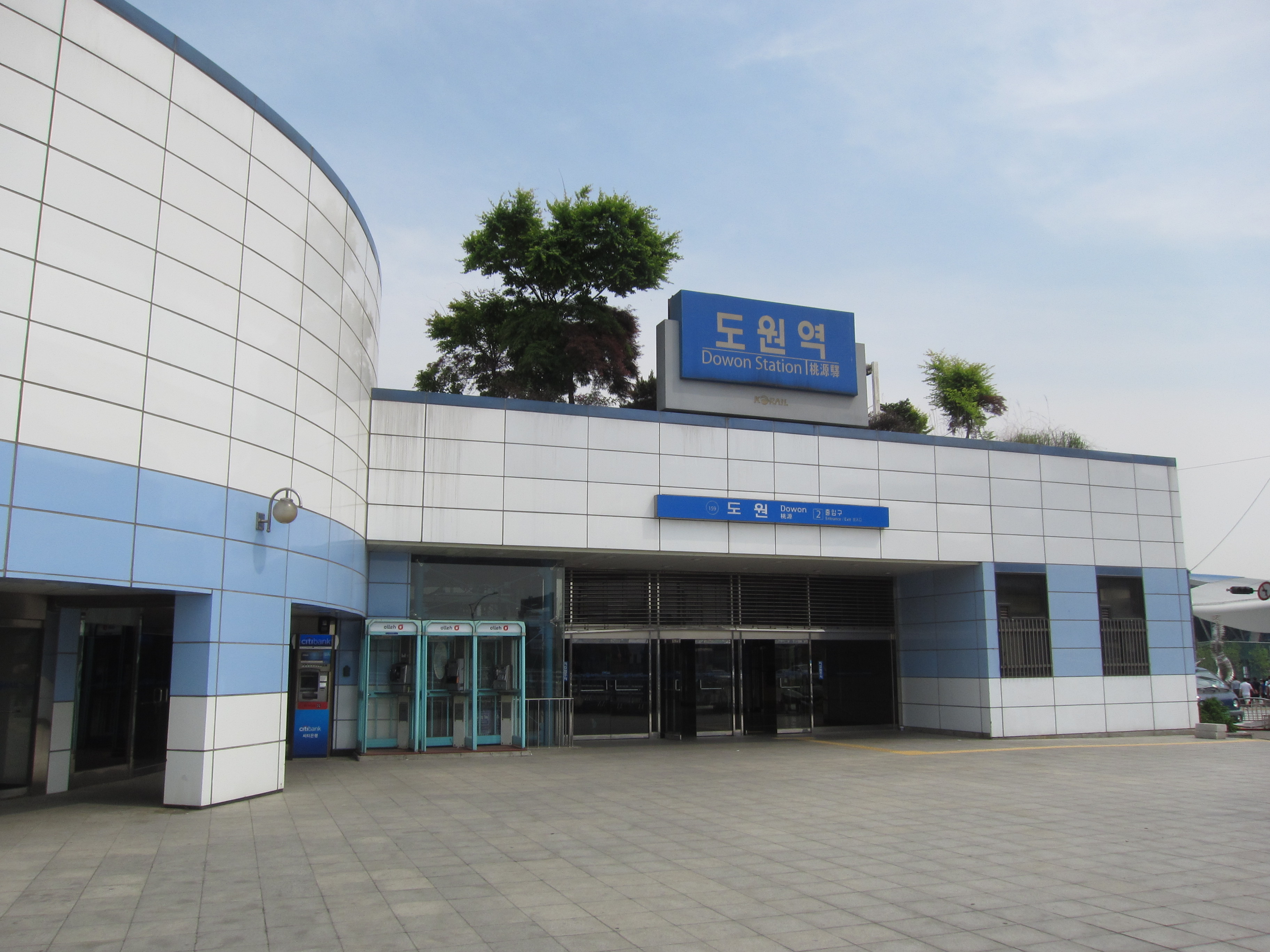

Korean name
- Hangul: 도원역
- Hanja: 桃源驛
- Revised Romanization: Dowonnyeok
- McCune–Reischauer: Towŏnnyŏk

General information
- Location: 179-1 Changyeong-dong, 245 Chamoejeonno, Jemulpo-gu, Incheon
- Operator: Korail
- Line: Line 1
- Platforms: 2
- Tracks: 4

Construction
- Structure type: Aboveground

Key dates
- July 11, 1994: Line 1 opened

Passengers
- (Daily) Based on Jan-Dec of 2012. Line 1: 8,423
Location

Dowon Station (Korean: 도원역; Hanja: 桃源驛; RR: Dowon-yeok) is a station on Seoul Subway Line 1. It is on Gyeongin Line. It was opened in 1899 as Ugakdong Station, which was terminated from service in 1906. The station was reopened in 1994.

== Vicinity ==
- Exit 1: Incheon Football Stadium
- Exit 2:

The JEI University is nearby.

Preceding station	Seoul Metropolitan Subway	Following station
Jemulpo towards Yeoncheon	Line 1	Dongincheon towards Incheon
Jemulpo towards Dongducheon	Line 1 Gyeongwon Express	Dongincheon towards Incheon
