= Jemulpo station =

Subway station in Incheon, South Korea

Coordinates: 37°28′0.42″N 126°39′24.48″E

제물포 (인천대학교 제물포캠퍼스); Jemulpo (Incheon Univ. Jemulpo Campus)
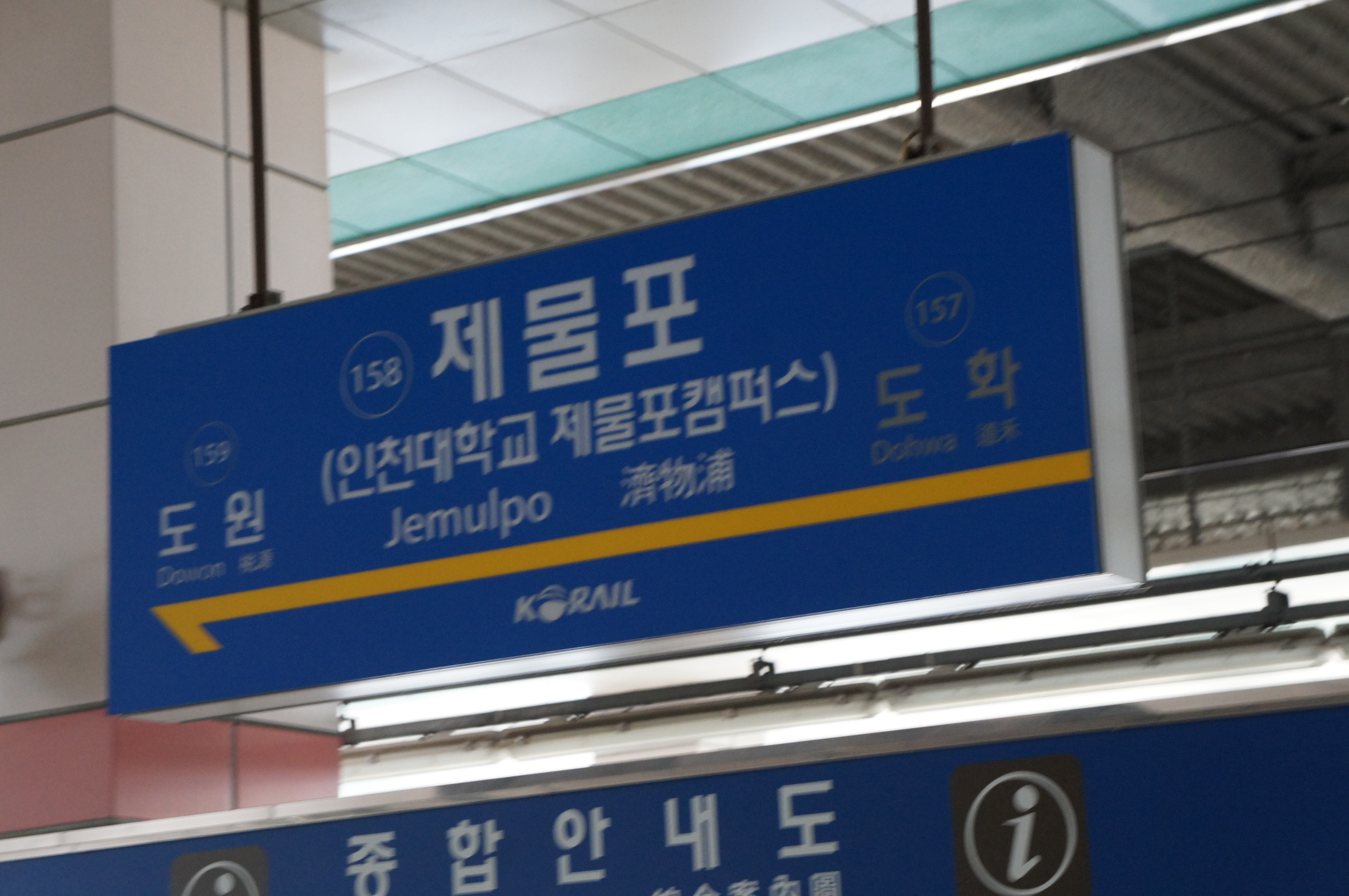
- Station Sign

Korean name
- Hangul: 제물포역
- Hanja: 濟物浦驛
- Revised Romanization: Jemulpo-yeok
- McCune–Reischauer: Chemulp'o-yŏk

General information
- Location: 649-9 Dohwa 1-dong, 129 Gyeonginno, Michuhol-gu, Incheon
- Operator: Korail
- Line: Line 1
- Platforms: 2
- Tracks: 4

Construction
- Structure type: Aboveground

History
- Opened: July 1, 1959

Key dates
- August 15, 1974: Line 1 opened

Passengers
- (Daily) Based on Jan-Dec of 2012. Line 1: 16,475
Location

Jemulpo Station (Korean: 제물포역; Hanja: 濟物浦驛; RR: Jemulpo-yeok) is a railway station of Seoul Subway Line 1 operated by Korail in Incheon, South Korea.

== History ==
- 1957: Station was firstly introduced under the name of Sungui station (숭의역)
- July 1959: Changed name to Jemulpo.
- In 2007, the plan to rebuild the station was announced.

== Vicinity ==
- Exit 1: Sunin High School
- Exit 2: Sung'ui Elementary School

The Jemulpo Campus of the University of Incheon is nearby.

The JEI University is nearby.

Preceding station	Seoul Metropolitan Subway	Following station
Dohwa towards Yeoncheon	Line 1	Dowon towards Incheon
Dohwa towards Dongducheon	Line 1 Gyeongwon Express	Dowon towards Incheon
Juan towards Yongsan	Line 1 Gyeongin Express	Dongincheon Terminus
