= Lee Dong-hwan (pastor) =

South Korean pastor (born 1980/1981)

Lee Dong-hwan (Korean: 이동환; born 1980 or 1981) is a South Korean Methodist pastor who was excommunicated by the Korean Methodist Church for his support of LGBT rights. Lee was an ordained minister at a Korean Methodist Church in Suwon from 2013 until 2020, after he was reported to church authorities for leading a prayer, blessing same-sex couples, and throwing flower petals at the 2019 Incheon Queer Culture Festival. He was suspended in 2020 for two years after the church found that his actions violated their rules preventing church members or pastors from supporting the LGBT rights movement. Lee continued to attend pride events within South Korea and formed an LGBT rights group to advocate for change within South Korean churches. As a result, he was excommunicated by the church in December 2023. The Suwon District Court granted an injunction suspending the excommunication on July 19, 2024, after Lee filed a lawsuit against the church.

In 2022, Lee was recognized by the Korean branch of Amnesty International for his activism.

== Career ==
=== Career and initial suspension ===
Lee became a minister at Glory Jeil, a Korean Methodist Church in Suwon, in 2013. Early in his life, he described himself as having negative preconceptions towards LGBT individuals. However, after a member of his church came out to him in 2015, he began to question his views on queer people. He eventually came to the conclusion that "If Jesus were alive today...[he] would be with the LGBTQ community". He recognized that his beliefs contradicted official Korean Methodist Church doctrine, which disapproves of same-sex relationships and prohibits LGBT rights advocacy by church members.

In 2019, Lee was invited to attend the Incheon Queer Culture Festival. At the event, he blessed a same-sex couple and led a prayer for LGBT people on the main stage. He threw flower petals into the audience, and added a rainbow-patterned stole to his minster's robes. According to Lee, he thought his actions might cause "issues" within the church, but that he believed that by performing the blessings he was acting in accordance with "God's will". A few days after the festival, he was called to a meeting with local church leaders and reported to the Gyeonggi Annual Conference. Lee was told that he was "humiliating the Methodist Church" and instructed to promise "never carry out such a blessing again". After an internal judicial hearing in October 2020, the church suspended Lee for two years. Lee criticized the hearing's fairness, as one of the judges had also been responsible for investigating him. He filed an appeal on October 15. It was dismissed two years later, on October 20, 2022, after the original suspension was due to expire.

The suspension itself was criticized by religious groups inside and outside Korea and by South Korean LGBT rights groups. A protest was held outside the Korean Methodist Church's headquarters in Seoul. The National Council of Churches in Korea said that in performing the blessing "Rev. Lee Dong-hwan only did his job", and the United Church of Canada termed his suspension "exceedingly unfair". Over 100 pastors from various Korean churches signed a letter supporting him, and individuals donated a total of ₩8,000,000(US$7,200) to cover the costs of his appeal. However, other netizens and pastors felt that the church had not been strict enough, and rather that suspend Lee, he ought to have been removed from his position or the church entirely. Some accused him of being gay, and, according to Lee, some senior pastors attempted to pressure him into dropping his appeal or recant his earlier statements in order to keep his job.

=== Excommunication and lawsuits ===
After his appeal was dismissed by the church, Lee filed a lawsuit in 2023 with the Seoul Central District Court to have his suspension overturned. The court dismissed the lawsuit in August, 2024. Throughout his suspension, Lee performed several additional blessings for LGBT individuals and couples and criticized the church's stance on LGBT issues. In response, the church excommunicated Lee in December 2023. The excommunication was criticized by several organizations. The National Council of Churches in Korea described it as "hate in the name of religion" and defended Lee, calling him "a faithful Christian". A representative of the LGBT rights group Rainbow Action said they hoped that the church would someday "apologize and repent of its wrongdoing" towards Lee, and the South Korean Coalition for Anti-Discrimination Legislation and Rainbow Jesus announced they would fundraise to help cover Lee's legal fees should he appeal.

In response to the excommunication, Lee lodged an appeal within the church. His lawyers also argued that, since there had been no complaint made against Lee to base the reindictment on, the ecclesiastical court had not followed proper procedures. The Korean Methodist Church heard the appeal in a tribunal, where they upheld the excommunication. According to the tribunal, when Lee performed the blessing and threw flower petals, he had violated their rules prohibiting "advocating or sympathizing with homosexuality" and thus the excommunication was warranted. They conceded that there had been an "error" in their procedures, but denied that it had negatively impacted Lee. They also found Lee liable for the costs of the appeal, announcing later that month that he owed them ₩28,642,532(US$21,800). The amount was described by The Hankyoreh as "excessively high compared to the denomination's normal trial costs" given that church's normal appeals typically cost only around ₩7,000,000. Lee was billed for the cost of the trials themselves, but also the costs of the conciliation process, the examination committee process, and a delay caused by the church when they assigned an ecclesiastical prosecutor with an external connection to a complainant. The church confirmed the excommunication in March 2024. Lee filed a lawsuit within the Suwon District court, which granted an injunction to temporarily suspend the excommunication on July 19, 2024. The courts dismissed his appeal in April 2025.

== Activism ==
In 2021 Lee was recognized by the Korean branch of Amnesty International for his activism, and in 2022, he founded a Christian LGBT activist group called Q&A. which stands for "Queer and Allies". The organisation is designed to tell the stories of queer Christians and advocate for their acceptance within churches. He has attended several pride festivals, and ran a stand at the 2021 and 2022 Seoul Queer Culture Festival.

In December 2023, Lee held a prayer at a disability rights protest at Hyehwa station. The protestors were removed from the station due to lack of advanced permission, and so held a prayer outside instead.

== Personal life ==
Lee Dong-hwan was raised in a religious family, although he did not view himself as particularly devout until he chose to attend a theological college as a teenager. In 2020 he stated that he was married and that he suffered from facial nerve paralysis brought on by the stress he experienced as a result of his suspension.
