= Bupyeong station =

Metro station in Incheon, South Korea

Coordinates: 37°29′22.39″N 126°43′26.66″E

부평 (가톨릭대 인천성모병원); Bupyeong (The Catholic Univ. of Korea Incheon St. Mary's Hospital)
I120
부평 (부평힘찬병원)
Bupyeong
(Bupyeong Himchan Hospital)
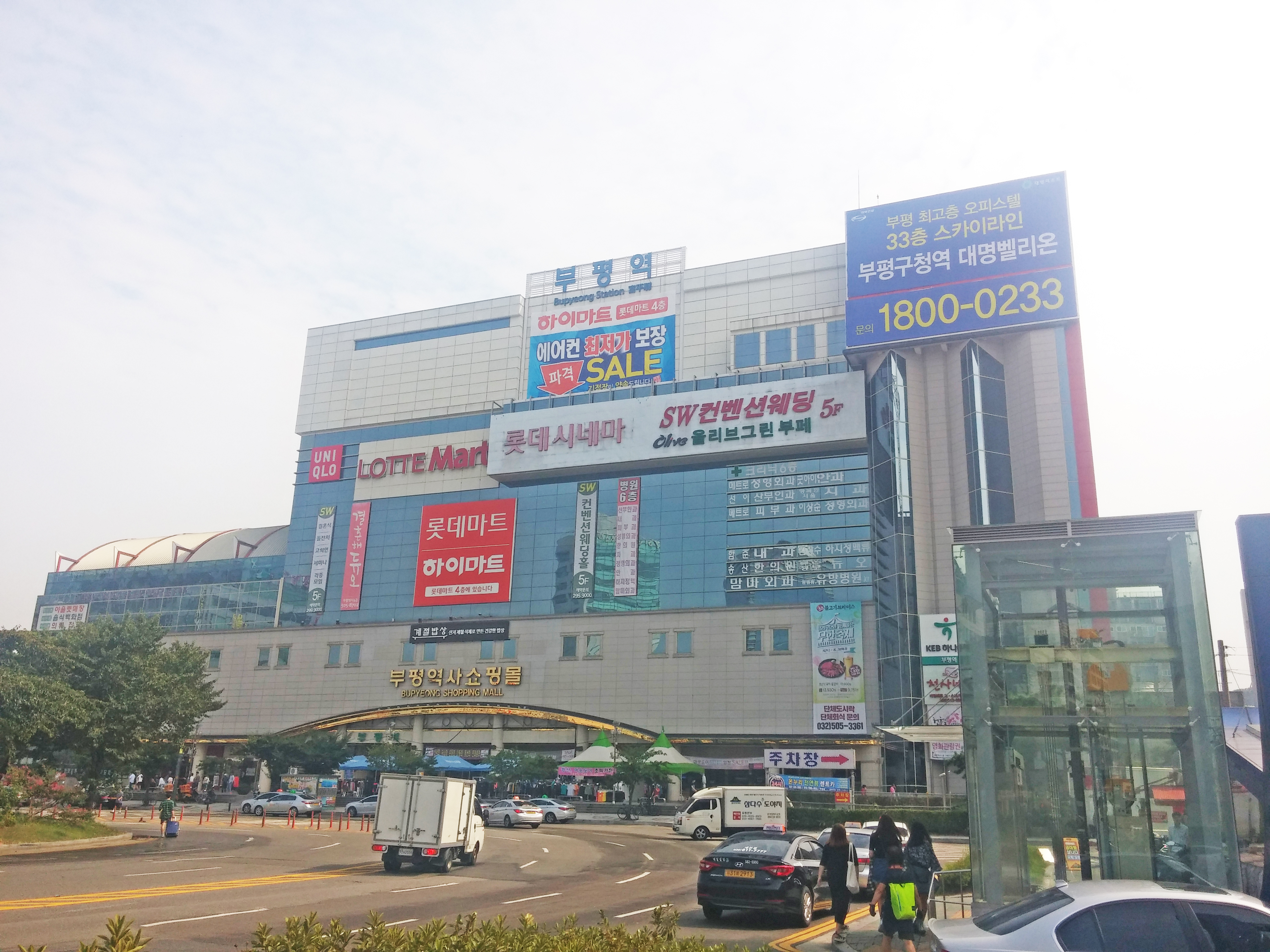
- Korail station

Korean name
- Hangul: 부평역
- Hanja: 富平驛
- Revised Romanization: Bupyeong-nyeok
- McCune–Reischauer: Pup'yŏng-nyŏk

The Catholic University of Korea Incheon St Mary's Hospital
- Hangul: 가톨릭대 인천성모병원
- Hanja: 가톨릭大 仁川聖母病院
- Revised Romanization: Gatollik-dae Incheon-seongmo-byeongwon
- McCune–Reischauer: Kat'ollik-tae Inch'ŏn-sŏngmo-pyŏngwŏn

Bupyeong Himchan Hospital
- Hangul: 부평힘찬병원
- Hanja: 富平힘찬病院
- Revised Romanization: Bupyeong-Himchan-byeongwon
- McCune–Reischauer: Pup'yŏng-Himch'an-pyŏngwŏn

General information
- Other names: The Catholic University of Korea Incheon St Mary's Hospital (Seoul Metro Line 1); Bupyeong Himchan Hospital (Incheon Subway Line 1)
- Location: 738-21 Bupyeong 1-dong, 16 Gwangjangno, Bupyeong-gu, Incheon
- Operator: Korail; Incheon Transit Corporation
- Lines: Gyeongin Line; Incheon Line 1
- Platforms: 4
- Tracks: 6

Construction
- Structure type: Aboveground (Line 1); Underground (Incheon Line 1)

Other information
- Station code: 152 (Korail); I120 (Incheon Subway)

History
- Opened: September 18, 1899; 127 years ago August 15, 1974; 52 years ago October 6, 1999; 27 years ago

Passengers
- (Daily) Based on Jan-Dec of 2012. Seoul Line 1: 90,620; Incheon Line 1: 12,474
Services
Preceding station	Seoul Metropolitan Subway	Following station
Bugae towards Yeoncheon	Line 1	Baegun towards Incheon
Songnae towards Yongsan	Line 1 Gyeongin Express	Dongam towards Dongincheon
Bugae towards Dongducheon	Line 1 Gyeongwon Express	Baegun towards Incheon
Preceding station	Incheon Subway	Following station
Bupyeong Market towards Geomdan Lake Park	Incheon Line 1	Dongsu towards Songdo Moonlight Festival Park
Location

Bupyeong station (Korean: 부평역; Hanja: 富平驛; RR: Bupyeong-yeok) is a subway station located in Bupyeong District, Incheon, South Korea. This station is on the Seoul Subway Line 1 and Incheon Subway Line 1. It is one of the busiest stations on the Incheon line because of its central location and its connection to the Seoul line.

== Entrance ==
- Exit 1: Bupyeong 6-dong Office, Yerim School, Bupyeong Catholic Medical Center
- Exit 2: Bupyeong Elementary School, Buil Girls' Middle School, Bupyeong 2-dong Office
- Exit 3: Police branch office at Bupyeong Station

== Underground market ==
The station is connected with an underground passage, consisting of small shops that sell various types of goods, including clothes, accessories, electronic devices and books. Many of these goods can be purchased cheaper than standard retail establishments. In addition, the station building has a Uniqlo store, food court, retail shops, various restaurants and a large Lotte Mart store.

== Passengers ==
According to data, the number of passengers traveling via this station has greatly decreased over the past few years. This is believed to be caused by the deployment of Metropolitan City buses.

Station	Figure												
Station	2000	2001	2002	2003	2004	2005	2006	2007	2008	2009	2010	2011	2012
Line 1	42675	50606	55855	56145	36980	36338	36018	35349	35739	35152	36651	44377	-
Incheon Subway Line 1	-	-	-	6174	5501	5200	6064	5768	5639	5478	5629	5934	6457

== In popular culture ==
The station has appeared several times in the widely popular South Korean film My Sassy Girl.

== Gallery ==
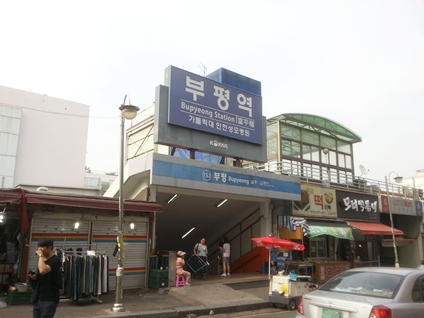
Exits in Bupyoeng Station

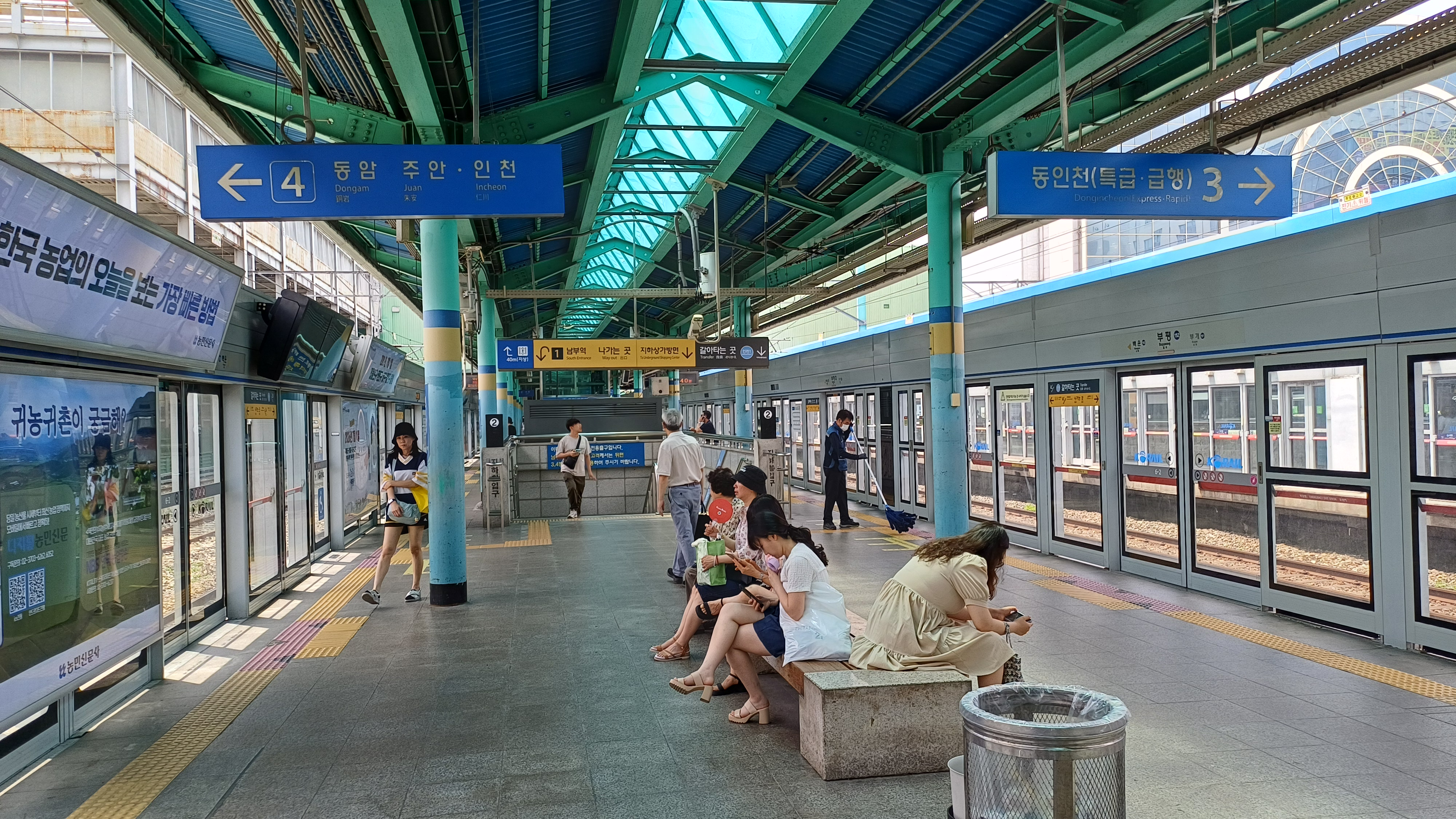
The platforms of Seoul subway Line 1 and the staircase leading to the Incheon subway transit passage

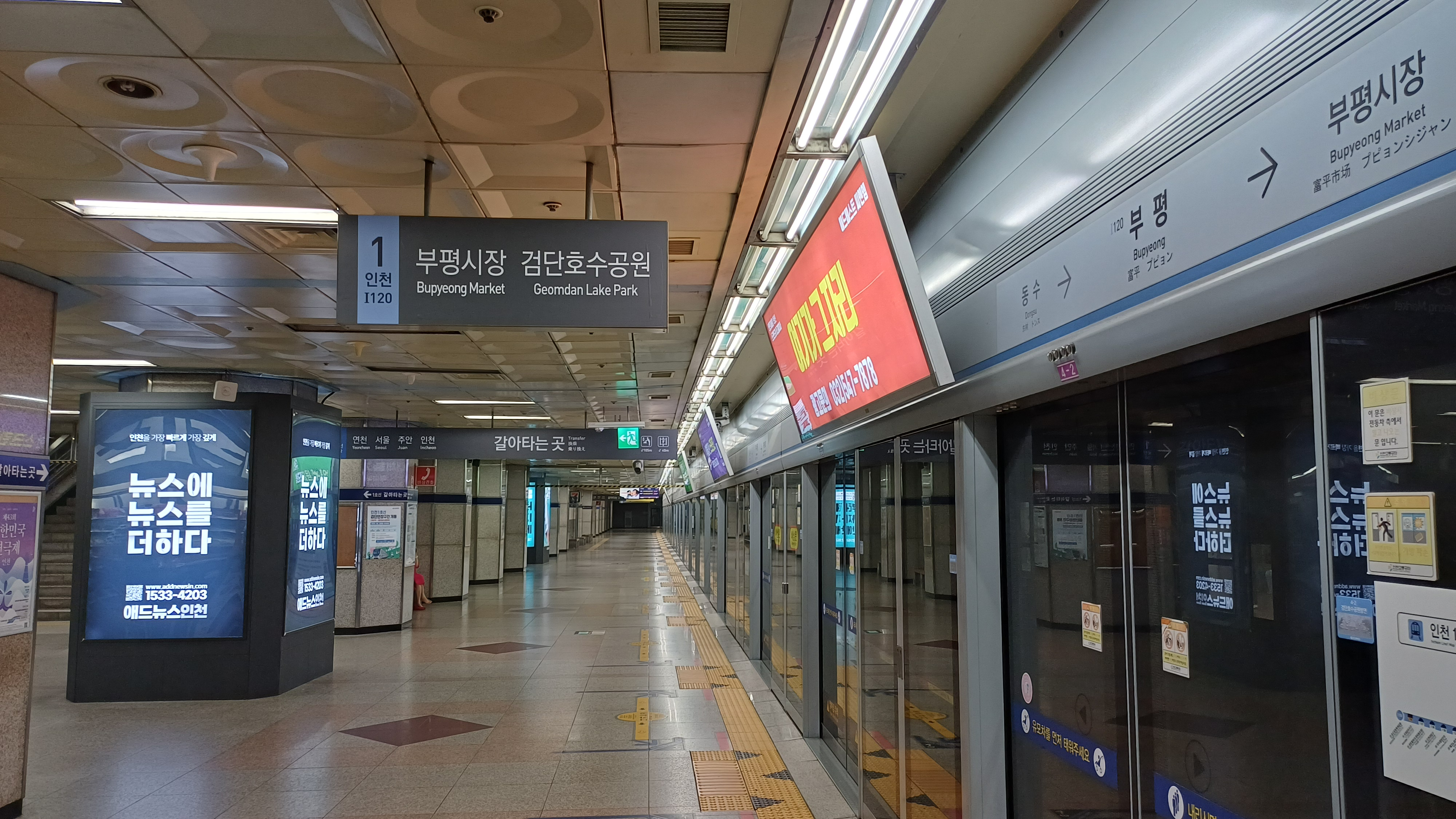
The platforms of Incheon Subway Line 1

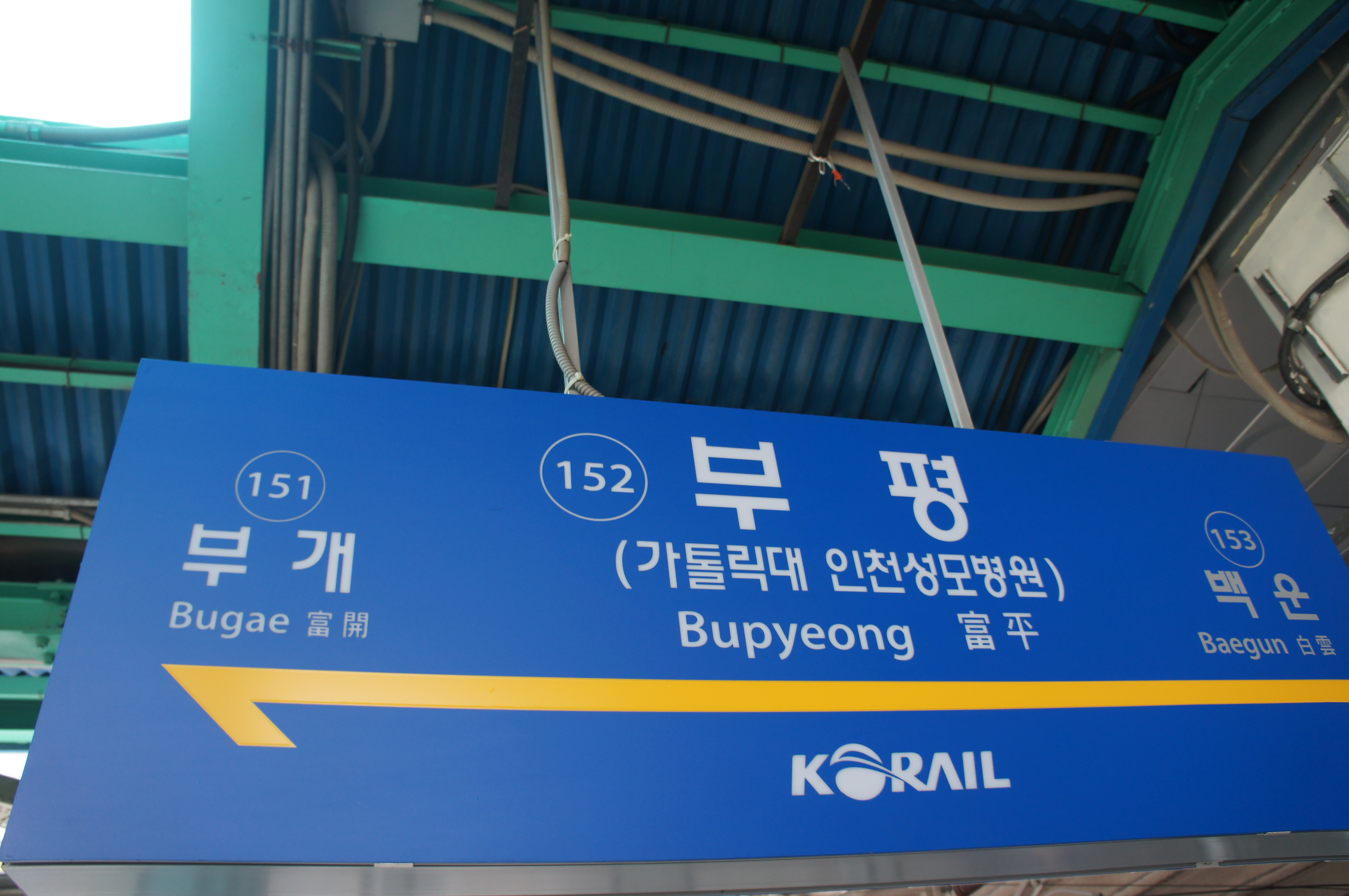
Seoul subway Line 1 station nameplate

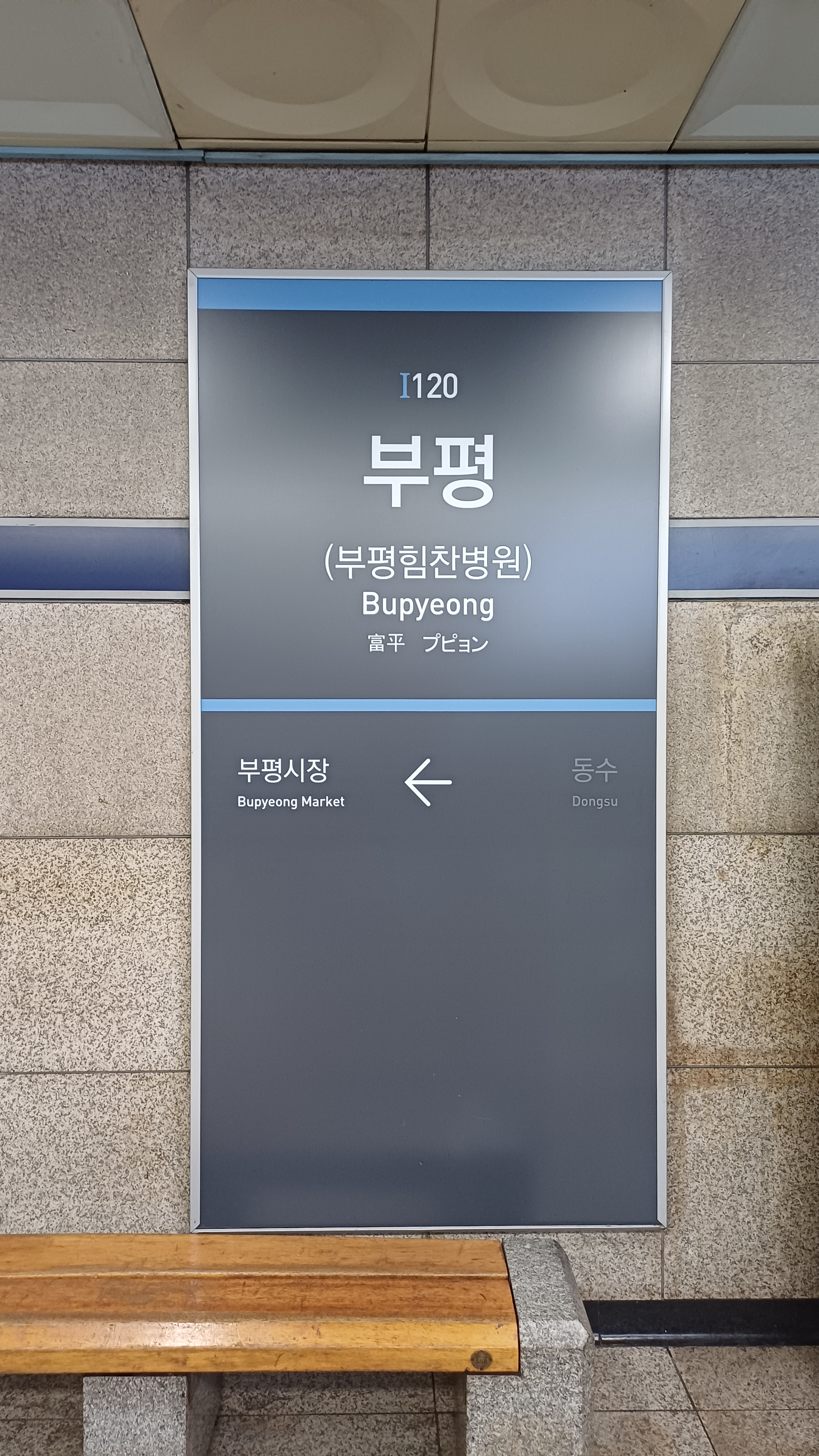
Incheon subway Line 1 station nameplate
