= Dongincheon station =

Metro station in Incheon, South Korea

Coordinates: 37°28′30.55″N 126°37′58.31″E

동인천; Dongincheon
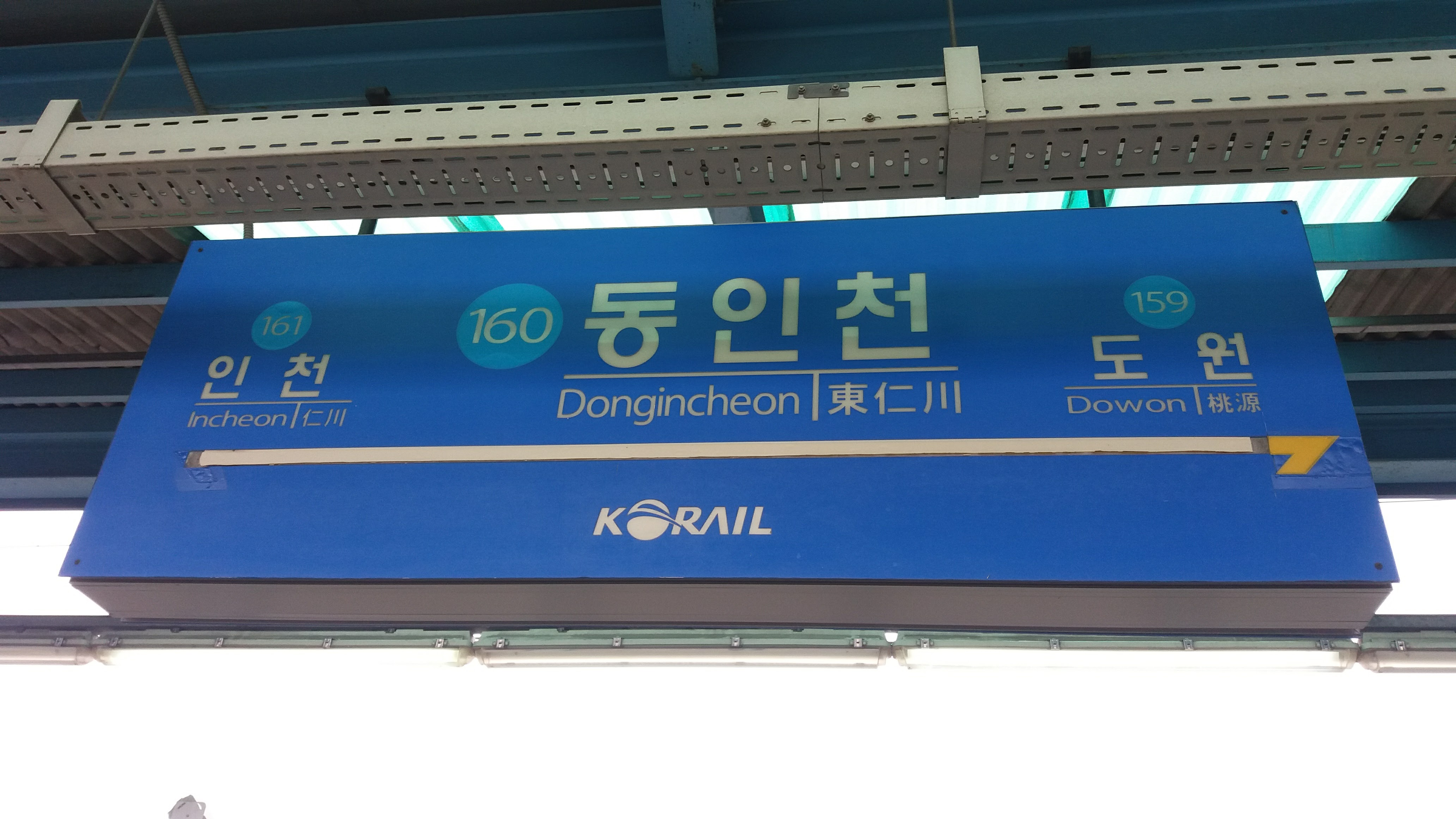
- Station Sign

Korean name
- Hangul: 동인천역
- Hanja: 東仁川驛
- Revised Romanization: Dongincheon-yeok
- McCune–Reischauer: Tonginch'ŏn-yŏk

General information
- Other names: East Incheon
- Location: 1-1 Inhyeon-dong, 121 Chamoejeonno, Jemulpo-gu, Incheon
- Operator: Korail
- Line: Line 1
- Platforms: 2
- Tracks: 4

Construction
- Structure type: Aboveground

History
- Opened: September 18, 1899; August 15, 1974
- Former names: Chukhyeon; Sangincheon

Passengers
- (Daily) Based on Jan-Dec of 2012. Line 1: 40,752
Services
Preceding station	Seoul Metropolitan Subway	Following station
Dowon towards Soyosan	Line 1	Incheon Terminus
Dowon towards Dongducheon	Line 1 Gyeongwon Express	Incheon Terminus
Jemulpo towards Yongsan	Line 1 Gyeongin Express	Terminus
Location

Dongincheon Station (Korean: 동인천역; Hanja: 東仁川驛; RR: Dongincheon-yeok) is a railway station on Seoul Metropolitan Subway Line 1 and Gyeongin Line located in Inhyeon-dong, Jemulpo District, Incheon. Upon its opening in 1899, the station was known as "Chukhyeon Station", and in 1955, received its current name (literally East Incheon). The subway service started in 1974.

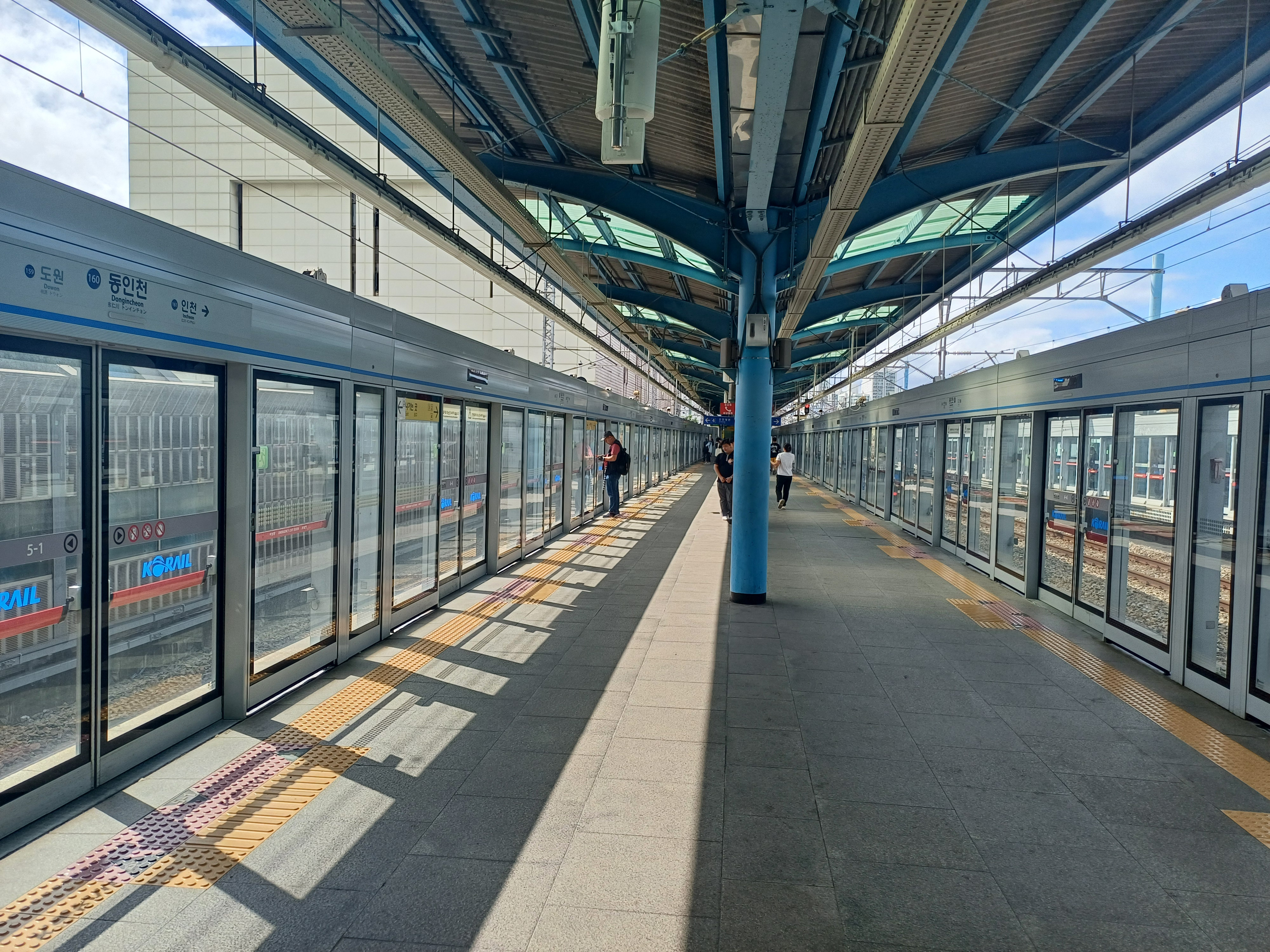
Station platform

== History ==
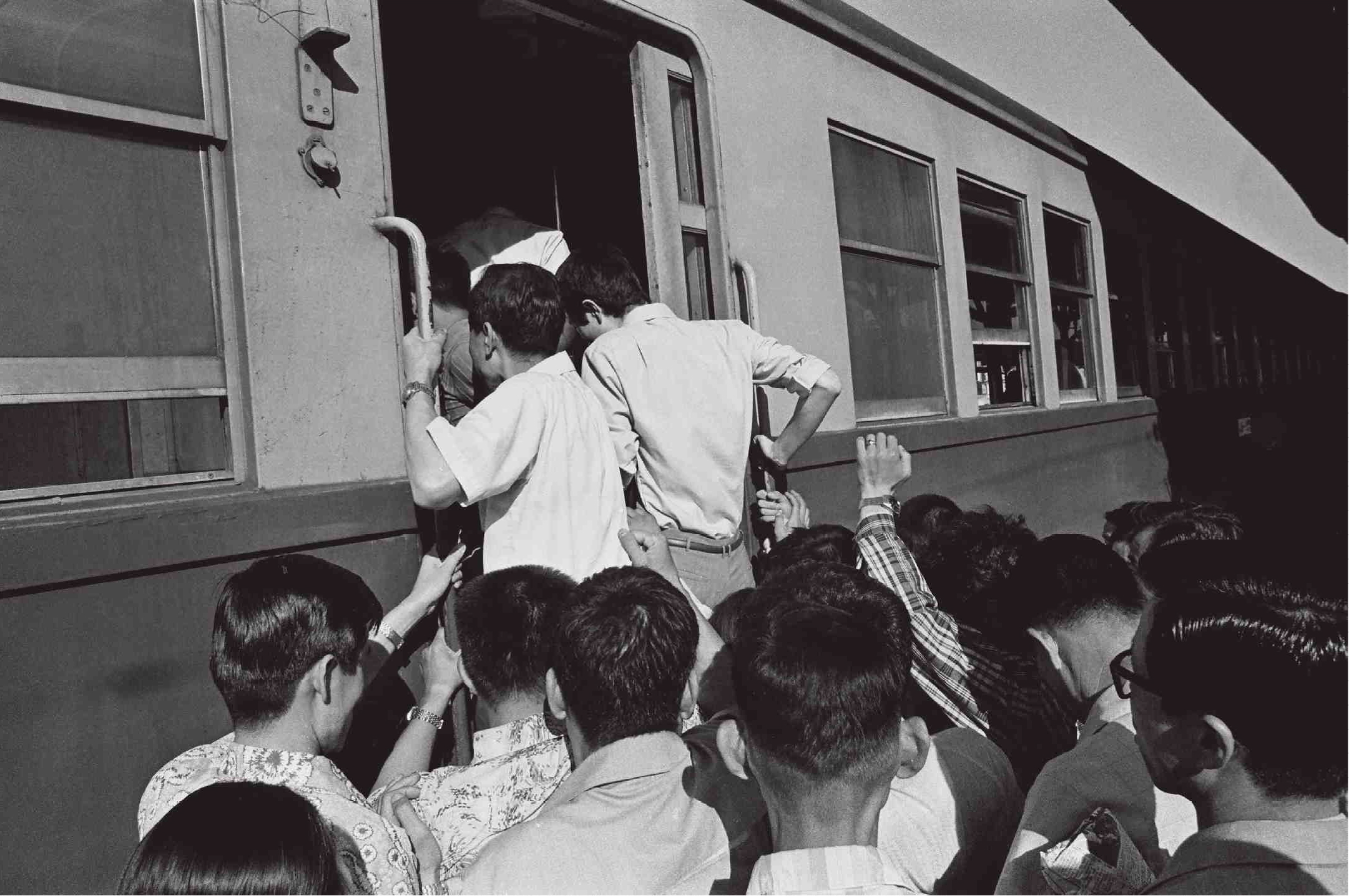
Gyeongin Line train at Dongincheon station (1972)

On September 18, 1899, the station began operations as Chuckhyeon Station. On April 25, 1926, the name was changed to Sangincheon Station. On August 7, 1955, the name was changed again to Dongincheon Station. On August 15, 1974, the station opened for Seoul Metropolitan Subway.
