= Doksan station =

Station on Line 1 of the Seoul Subway

Coordinates: 37°27′56″N 126°53′23″E

독산; Doksan
- Line 1 platforms

Korean name
- Hangul: 독산역
- Hanja: 禿山驛
- RR: Doksan-yeok
- MR: Toksan-yŏk

General information
- Location: 115 Beotggonno, Geumcheon-gu, Seoul
- Operator: Korail
- Line: Line 1
- Platforms: 2
- Tracks: 2

Construction
- Structure type: Aboveground

Key dates
- January 7, 1998: Line 1 opened

Passengers
- (Daily) Based on Jan-Dec of 2012. Line 1: 30,889
Location

Doksan station (Korean: 독산역) is a station on Line 1 of the Seoul Subway. It is an above-ground station located in southwestern Seoul, with service between Kwangwoon University and Seodongtan / Sinchang.

It is a relatively new addition to this section of Line 1, having been opened 1998 in response to growing demand from the adjacent Doksan and Gasan neighborhoods, as well as the Ha'an area in the nearby suburban city of Gwangmyeong. The station is also equipped with an elevator.

It is a two-sided, two-way platform with a screen door. In the middle, there is a Gyeongbu 1-line passage line used by general trains and Seoul-Cheonan express trains. There are two exits, and an elevator was established in 2015.

== Vicinity ==
- Exit 1: Dusan Elementary School, Gasan Middle School
- Exit 2: Geumcheon Bridge

Preceding station	Seoul Metropolitan Subway	Following station
Gasan Digital Complex towards Kwangwoon University	Line 1	Geumcheon-gu Office towards Seodongtan or Sinchang
Gasan Digital Complex towards Yeongdeungpo	Line 1 Gwangmyeong Shuttle Service	Geumcheon-gu Office towards Gwangmyeong
