= Class 1000 =

Class 1000 or 1000 class may refer to:

- Class 1000 Shinkansen, a class of Japanese trains built in the 1960s
- NS Class 1000, a class of Dutch electric locomotives built in the 1940s
- Korail Class 1000, a class of South Korean trains built from 1974 to 1996
- Midland Railway 1000 Class, a class of British steam locomotives first built in 1902
- GWR 1000 Class, a British steam locomotive built in the 1940s
- LRTA 1000 class, 1980s light rail vehicles operated by the Light Rail Manila Corporation
- SS 1000 class, a Dutch East Indies steam locomotive built from 1918 to 1922
- Class 1000 (standard), a cleanroom standard for air purity
