= Korail Class 1000 =

South Korean train

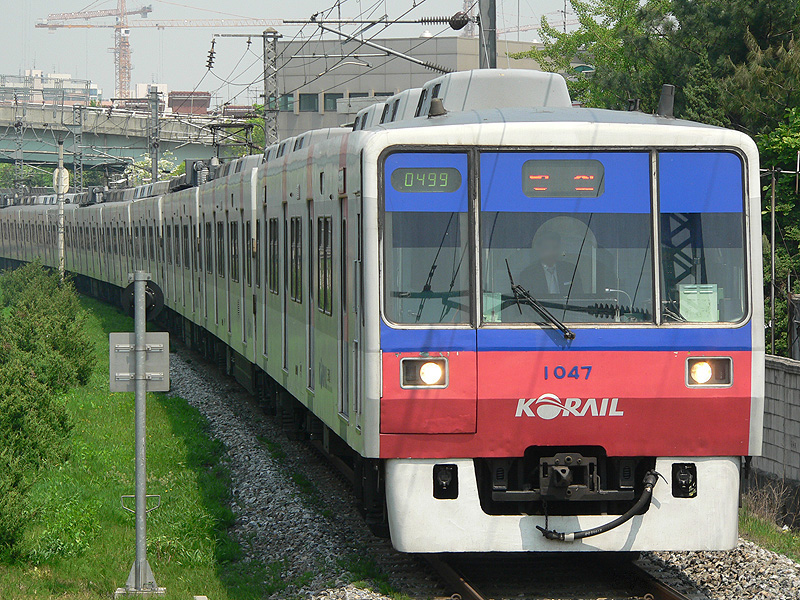
- Second generation train 1-47 approaching Seoksu
- In service: 1st generation: 1974–2014; 2nd generation: 1987–2019; 3rd generation: 1994–2020
- Manufacturers: Kawasaki Heavy Industries, Tokyu Car Corporation, Kinki Sharyo; Daewoo Heavy Industries, Hyundai Precision & Industries, Hanjin Heavy Industries (current Rotem)
- Constructed: 1st generation: 1972–1985; 2nd generation: 1986–1992; 3rd generation: 1993–1997
- Refurbished: 2003–2006
- Scrapped: 1st generation: 1998–2008 (un-overhauled cars); 2012–2014 (overhauled cars); 2nd generation: 2006 (un-overhauled trains); 2012–2019 (overhauled trains); 3rd generation: 2015–2020
- Number built: 793: 1st batch: 400 (+3 replacement cars); 2nd batch: 238 (+10 for 1st batch trains); 3rd batch: 98 (+44 for 2nd batch trains)
- Number preserved: 17
- Number scrapped: 626
- Formation: 10 cars per train TC-M-M'-T-M-M'-T-M-M'-TC (formerly 4, 6, and 8)
- Fleet numbers: Trains 1-01~1-81, 1-83~1-86
- Capacity: 1st generation: 148 (48 seated); 2nd and 3rd generation: 160 (54 seated)
- Operator: (South Korea) Korail

Specifications
- Car length: 19.5 m (63 ft 11 11/16 in)
- Width: 3.12 m (10 ft 2 13/16 in)
- Height: 3.8 m (12 ft 5 5/8 in)
- Doors: 4 per side, 8 per car
- Maximum speed: 1st generation: 100 km/h (62 mph); 2nd and 3rd generation: 110 km/h (68 mph)
- Weight: 1st generation: 33.3 t (73,414 lb); 2nd generation: 42.1 t (92,815 lb); 3rd generation: 46.1 t (101,633 lb)
- Power output: 2,880 kW (3,862 hp)
- Acceleration: 2.5 km/(h⋅s) (1.6 mph/s); 3.5 km/(h⋅s) (2.2 mph/s) (special formation)
- Deceleration: 3 km/(h⋅s) (1.9 mph/s) (service); 4 km/(h⋅s) (2.5 mph/s) (emergency)
- Electric systems: 25 kV 60 Hz AC; 1.5 kV DC
- Current collection: Overhead
- Safety system: ATS
- Track gauge: 1,435 mm (4 ft 8 1/2 in)

The Korail Class 1000 was a series of electric multiple units built in Seoul, South Korea, for Seoul Subway Line 1. The cars were built in and entered service between 1974 and 1997. They were gradually retired from the late 1990s to 2020 by newer electric multiple unit trains.

== Technical details ==
South Korea had no experience of manufacturing and operating EMUs in the 1970s, when Seoul Subway Line 1 was under construction. As a result, Japanese rolling stock companies manufactured the first Class 1000 trains in 1974.

Therefore, the first Class 1000 cars were based on Japanese electric multiple units: the electrical equipment was based on the multivoltage JNR 415 series (1500 V DC or 20 kV AC at 50 or 60 Hz), while the carbody was based on the JNR 301 series in use in Tokyo for Chuo-Sobu Line through-services with the TRTA Tozai Line. From 1976, Korean rolling stock companies started manufacturing Class 1000 cars domestically, and eventually manufactured cars with different carbody designs.

== Formation ==
The Class 1000 cars were last arranged in 10-car trains. All trains use 6 motor (M) cars and 4 trailer (T) cars in a TC-M-M'-T-M-M'-T-M-M'-TC formation. Details of the car types are listed below:

- 10XX - Tc (trailer driving car)
- 12XX - M (air compressor, battery, main resistor and controller)
- 13XX - M' (transformer, SIV, pantograph)
- 18XX - T (trailer car)
- 14XX - M
- 15XX - M'
- 19XX - T
- 16XX - M
- 17XX - M'
- 11XX - Tc

An M-M' car pair was numbered 12XX-13XX, 14XX-15XX, or 16XX-17XX, respectively, and there could be multiple trains with the same first 2 digits (such as two 16XX-17XX pairs). Additionally, trailer cars (such as two 19XXs instead of a 18XX/19XX pair) have been irregularly placed as well. The final formation of two trains was a TC-M-M'-M-M'-M-M'-M-M'-TC formation (four pairs of M-M' car pairs with no trailer car pairs) that allowed for a slightly faster acceleration. (Note: Trains 1-60~1-61)

=== Older Formations ===
When Seoul Subway Line 1 first opened, the Class 1000 cars were arranged in six-car trains, and were expanded to eight-car trains between 1980 and 1981 before being expanded to 10 cars by the 1990s. A six-car formation was numbered as following (where YY is one integer greater than XX):

- 10XX - Tc (trailer driving car)
- 13XX - M (air compressor, battery, main resistor and controller)
- 16XX - M' (transformer, SIV, pantograph)
- 13YY - M
- 16YY - M'
- 10YY - Tc

An eight-car formation was numbered as following (where YY is one integer greater than XX, and ZZ is one integer greater than YY):

- 10XX or 11XX - Tc (trailer driving car)
- 13XX or 14XX - M (air compressor, battery, main resistor and controller)
- 16XX or 17XX - M' (transformer, SIV, pantograph)
- 13YY or 14YY - M
- 16YY or 17YY - M'
- 13ZZ or 14ZZ - M
- 16ZZ or 17ZZ - M'
- 10ZZ or 11ZZ - Tc

== Models ==
=== First Generation ===
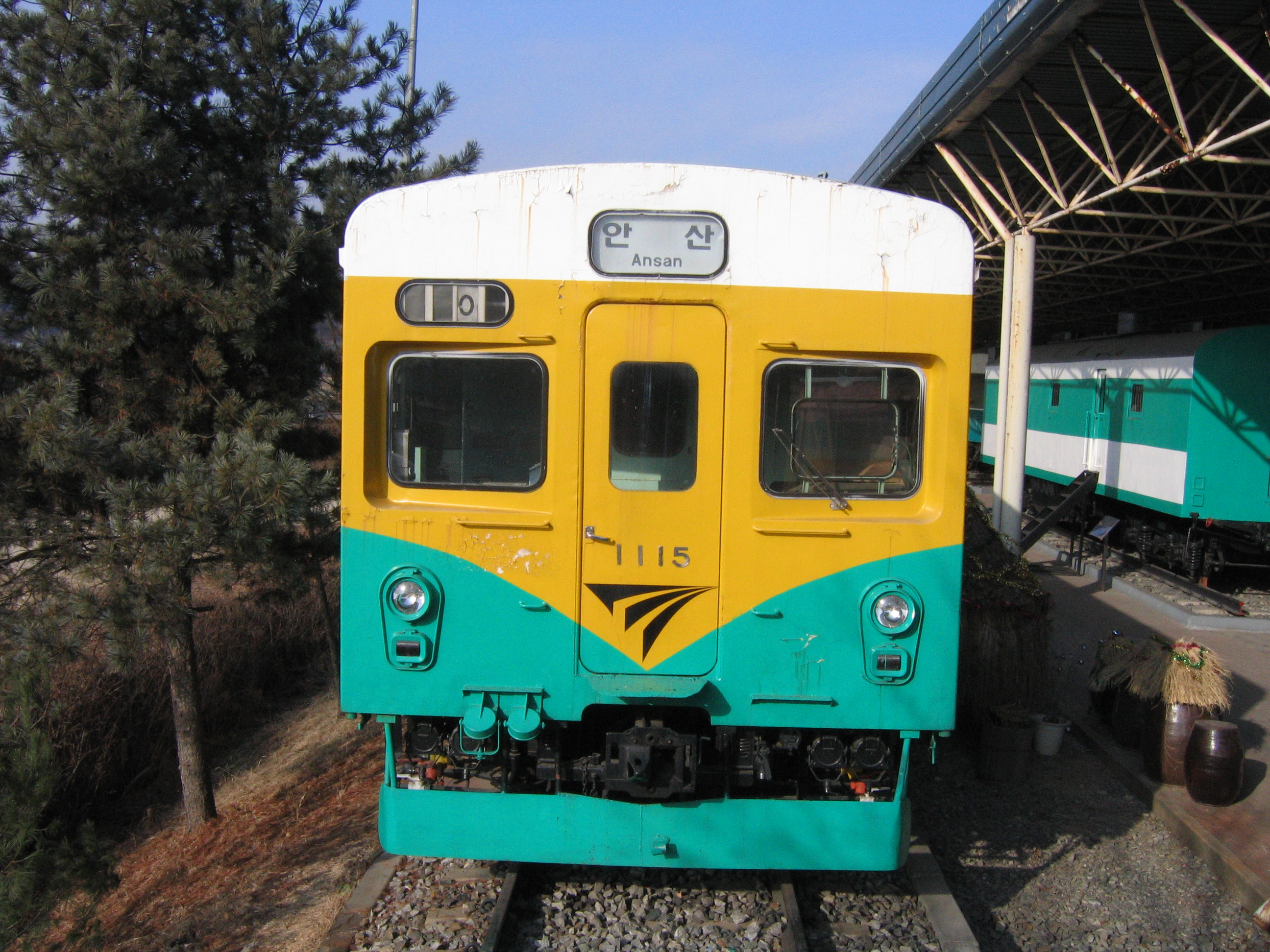
First batch car 1115 preserved at the Korean Railroad Museum.

Trains 1-01~1-41 were 1st generation trains and were introduced from 1974 to 1979. Their general appearance was similar to Japanese EMUs built around their time; the earliest cars were even assembled by various Japanese railcar manufacturers. All other cars were built by Korean railcar manufacturers Daewoo Heavy Industries and Hyundai Precision under license. All trains were assigned to Guro Depot and had the old Korean National Railroad (KNR) livery up to their retirement. The cars were nicknamed the initial rheostat cars (초저항).

The first generation of Seoul Metro 1000-series trains, which were built around the same time, were identical to these trains. Other Seoul Metro trains also had designs derived from the 1st generation trains.

==== Batch 1 ====
The first batch of 1st generation trains consisted of 126 cars that were originally linked as 21 six-car trains. The cars were manufactured in 1974 under Kawasaki Heavy Industries, Kinki Sharyo, Tokyu Car Corporation (now JTEC), and Nippon Sharyo.

As ridership increased on Line 1, the trains were rearranged into eight-car trains in the 1980s. As this rearrangement occurred, seven of the trains lost their four motor cars, which were given to the other 14 cars. In place, 42 motor cars were manufactured in Korea between 1980 and 1981 for the seven donor trains. Finally, the trains were extended to ten cars from 1984 to 1985 with two unpowered cars each manufactured in Korea during that time.

In the 1990s, the trains received their current numbers. The 14 trains that utilized eight Japanese-made cars were numbered as trains 1-01~1-14, while the seven that lost their original motor cars were renumbered to 1-29~1-35.

The train that became train 1-02 was involved in an accident at the Hankuk University of Foreign Studies station on October 2, 1984, that led to two damaged cars (a driving car and a motor car) being scrapped and the rest of the train being placed out of service. The train that became train 1-14 experienced a similar accident at Incheon station and received the driving car that survived from the 1984 accident to replace the one driving car that was heavily damaged. In turn, the two driving cars in the out-of-service train were eventually replaced by second batch driving cars, and the motor car was replaced by a new car built in 1986.

The trains were replaced by the Class 311000 trains. They were retired between 1998 and 1999, except for train 1-02, which was kept in service until June 2004. After trains 1-29~1-35 were retired, their motor cars were linked with other trains until 2006, and their unpowered cars were rebuilt into driving cars by Rotem in 2002 and received new front ends. (Note: Cars 1829-1835 and 1929-1935) They were renumbered to cars 1088-1094 and 1188-1194 and were linked with newer first generation cars. The cars were replaced with 3rd generation Class 311000 trains and taken out of service in 2006 when they finally reached their 25-year lifespans, and were stored at the Byeongjeom Car Depot until 2011, when they were finally taken off property to be scrapped or repurposed.

==== Batch 2 ====
The second batch of 1st generation trains consisted of 126 cars that were originally linked as 21 six-car trains. The cars were manufactured from 1976 to 1979 under Daewoo Heavy Industries.

As ridership increased on Line 1, the trains were rearranged into eight-car trains in the 1980s. As this rearrangement occurred, seven of the trains lost their four motor cars, which were given to the other 14 cars. In place, 26 motor cars were manufactured in Korea between 1980 and 1981 for four of the seven donor trains; one received only two motor cars and ran as a four-car train on the Yongsan-Seongbuk shuttle line, and the other two (four driving cars) were held out of service. From 1984 to 1986, the 18 eight-car trains were extended to ten cars, the four-car train was extended to eight cars, a new four-car train was formed, and the remaining two driving cars were donated to the train that would become train 1-02. Finally, in 1989, the two eight-car trains and the four-car train were extended to ten cars with second generation cars built then.

In the 1990s, the trains received their current numbers. The 14 trains that utilized eight original cars were numbered as trains 1-15~1-28, while the remaining six that lost their original motor cars were renumbered to 1-36~1-41.

The trains were replaced by the Class 311000 trains. They were gradually retired between 2000 and 2004; the last trains, trains 1-26~1-28 and 1-41, were retired in June 2004. However, due to their less advanced age, the powered cars in trains 1-36~1-41 and all unpowered cars were saved from retirement and linked with other trains until at least 2006. Many of the cars built from 1984 to 1986 were even refurbished in 2006-2007 and were not retired until September 2014, when the final unpowered cars in 2nd generation train 1-55 were retired with the rest of train 1-55, marking the end of service life of the first generation trains.

=== Second Generation ===
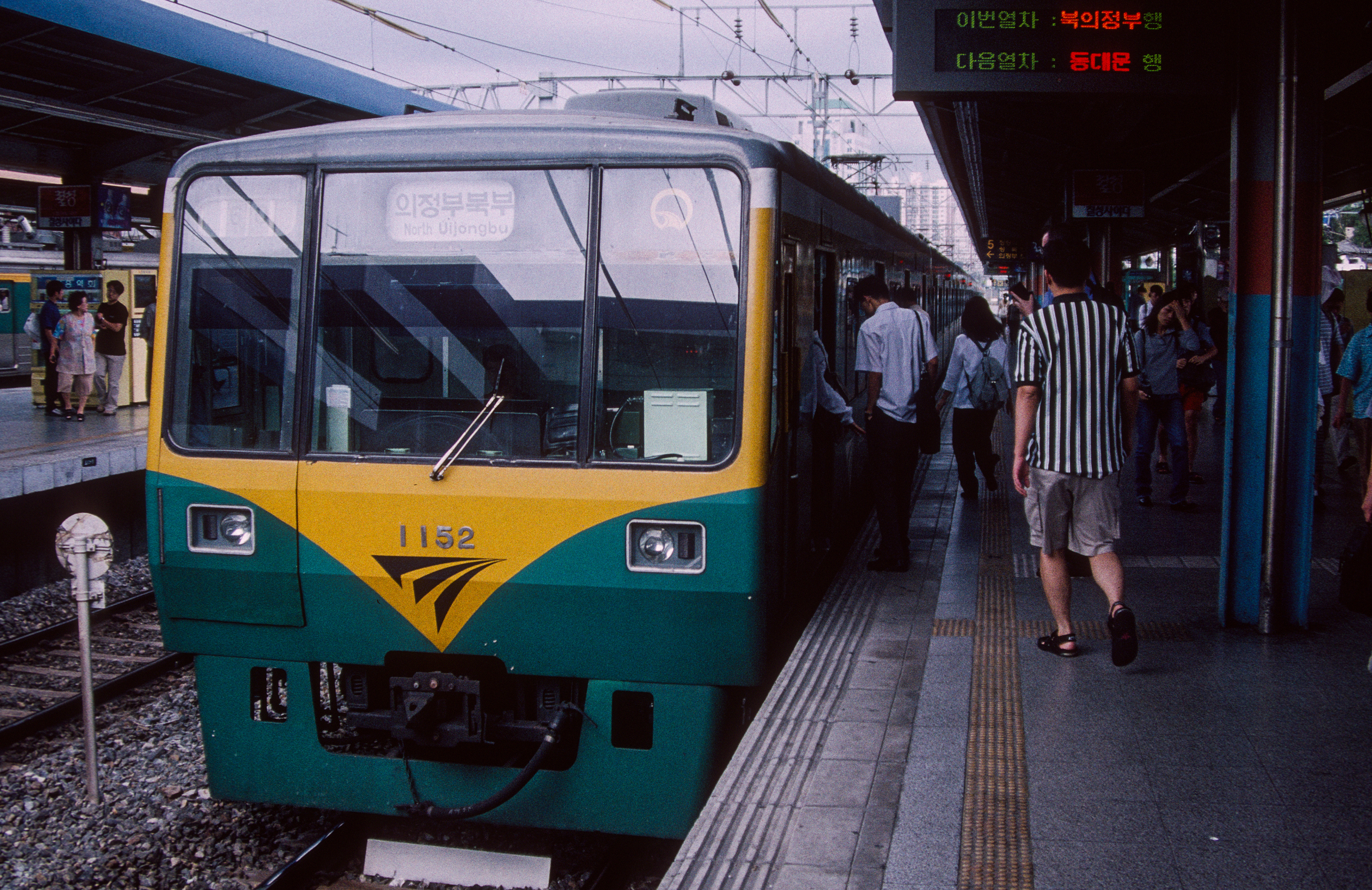
Second batch train 1-52 with old livery

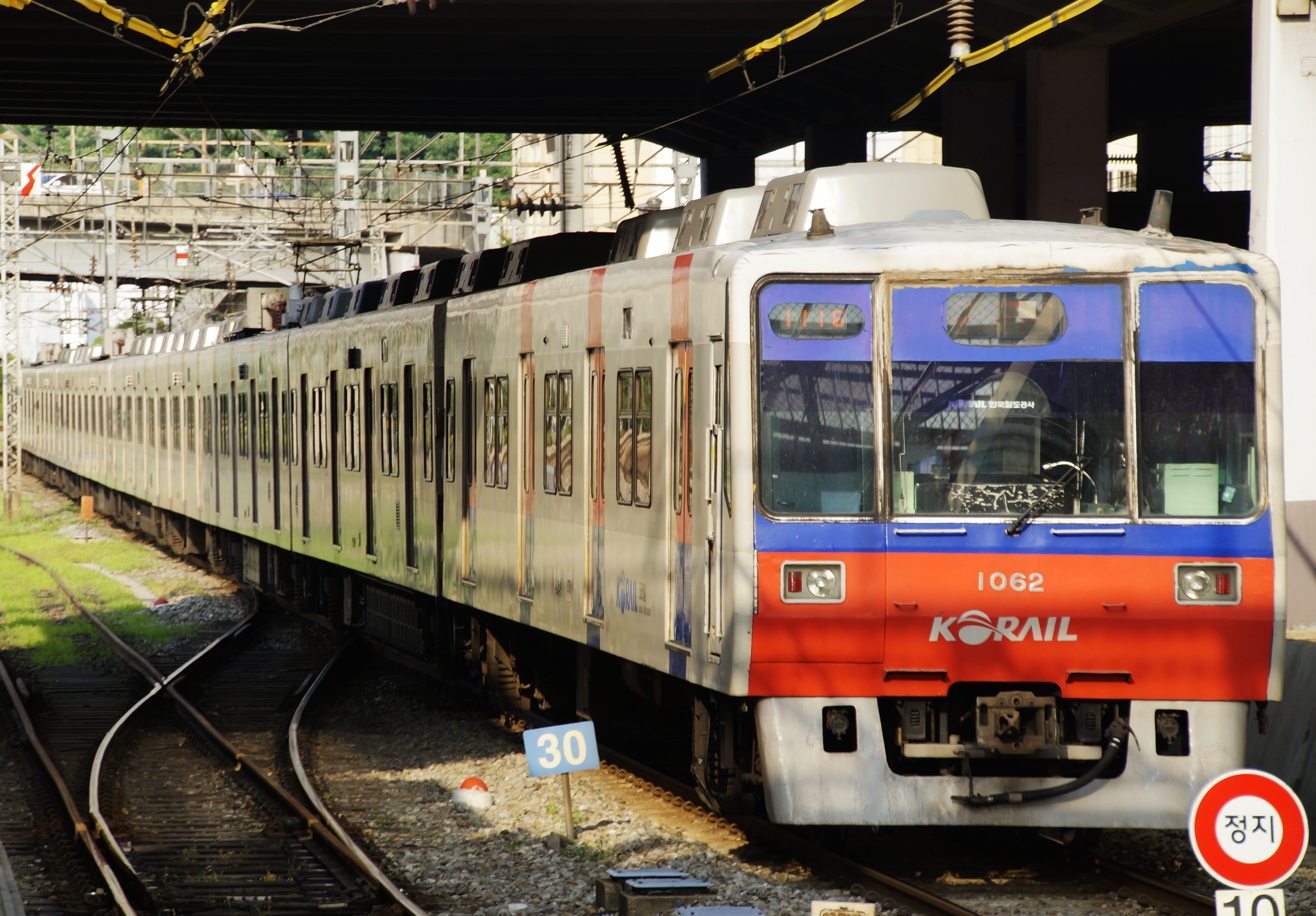
Second batch train 1-62 departing Noryangjin.

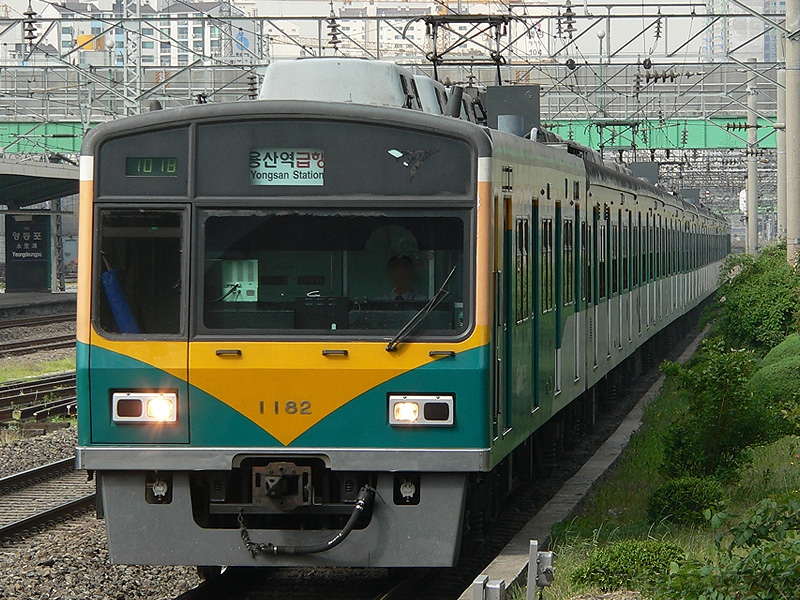
Refurbished 2nd batch car 1182 (ex-1942) at Yeongdeungpo station as a Yongsan-Dongincheon express train.

Trains 1-42~1-73 were 2nd generation trains and were introduced from 1986 to 1992. The 2nd batch trains were introduced to supply more trains to Line 1. Several additional 2nd generation cars were built to lengthen first generation trains to ten cars.

The 2nd generation featured a redesigned car body. The front end of the train was changed completely, and a train event recorder was introduced. Unlike the 1st generation trains, the 2nd generation trains were delivered with air-conditioning; thus SIV systems were introduced to power the air conditioners. All trains had the old Korean National Railroad (KNR) livery, but received the new livery following overhaul. Trains 1-42~1-63 were built from 1986 to 1989 with long, rectangular-windowed doors while trains 1-64~1-73 were built from 1991 to 1992 with short, square-windowed doors; however, many cars with rectangular-windowed doors were refitted with 1st generation trains' doors. The cars were nicknamed the middle rheostat cars (중저항).

==== Batch 1 ====
The first batch of 2nd generation trains consisted of train 1-42~1-63. The cars were manufactured from 1986 to 1991. As built, trains 1-42~1-49 were ten cars long, trains 1-50~1-56 were six cars long and ran on the Ansan Line, and trains 1-57~1-63 were four cars long and ran on the Yongsan-Seongbuk shuttle line. Ten additional cars were built to lengthen first generation trains 1-39~1-41 to ten cars.

As ridership increased on Line 1, trains 1-50~1-53 and 1-57~1-63 were lengthened with third generation cars from 1994 to 1997. As this rearrangement occurred, trains 1-50~1-53 and 1-59~1-61 were lengthened to ten cars, and trains 1-57~1-58 and 1-62~1-63 were lengthened to six cars for Ansan Line service.

In 1999, three unpowered cars (two from train 1-42 and one from train 1-43) were rebuilt into driving cars by Daewoo Heavy Industries. They were renumbered to cars 1082, 1182, and 1087, (Note: Cars 1842, 1942, and 1943, respectively) and were linked with 1st generation cars. Because no car numbered 1187 was built, car 1087 ran with 3rd generation car 1186 and was retired in 2001. Meanwhile, 1082 and 1182 lasted until 2006, when they were pulled from service due to structural integrity issues, stored at the Byeongjeom Car Depot until the end of 2011, and then scrapped.

All but four trains were overhauled between 2007 and 2008. Trains 1-53, 1-57, 1-63, and 1-65 were prematurely retired in 2006, because they were coupled with eight aging 1st generation cars each, so it was found to be easier to retire the trains instead of overhauling them to be fire-resistant. They were stored at the Byeongjeom and Guro train depots and taken off property before the end of 2015.

On May 1, 2010, train 1-58 was wrecked in a collision with Class 311000 train 311-74 (which was known as Class 5000 train 5-75 at the time of the collision). Car 1158 suffered significant damage while other cars behind it received minor damage. The whole train was retired and most cars were scrapped shortly after. (Note: Cars 1058 and 1258, the ninth and tenth cars in the train, would be scrapped in 2014 or 2015, years after the incident.)

Both unpowered cars of 1-39~1-40 and one car in train 1-41 were converted into unpowered cars and could be found in Class 311000 trains 311-39~311-41 until 2018, when they were replaced with other Class 311000 cars or Class 341000 cars. Meanwhile, cars 1441, 1541, 1641, and 1741 were used in 2nd batch trains after the retirement of train 1-41, but all cars were retired with train 1-58 on May 1, 2010 when the whole train was damaged in an accident.

The overhauled trains were replaced by the Class 311000 trains and were retired between 2012 and 2015. Most 3rd generation cars built in 1996 that were used to extend the trains were retained for use in other trains.

==== Batch 2 ====
The second batch of 2nd generation trains consisted of train 1-64~1-73. The cars were manufactured from 1991 to 1992. As built, trains 1-67~1-73 were ten cars long and trains 1-64~1-66 were six cars long and ran on the Ansan Line. Additional cars were built to lengthen first generation trains to 10 cars.

All but one train were overhauled between 2007 and 2008. Train 1-65 was prematurely retired in 2006, because it was coupled with eight aging 1st generation cars, so it was found to be easier to retire the train instead of overhauling it to be fire-resistant. It was stored around the system before being taken off property in 2011 or 2012.

The overhauled trains were replaced by the Class 311000 trains. They were retired between 2015 and March 30, 2017, when the last train, train 1-73, made its final run. After retirement, parts of trains 1-72 and 1-73 were used on the Yeongdong Line for testing in mid-2017 before being stored out of service again. In a surprise move, cars 1673 and 1773 were brought back into service in March 2019, when they replaced two powered cars in train 1-79. The cars were retired again in mid-November 2019 when train 1-79 was retired, marking the end of service life of the second generation trains.

=== Third Generation ===
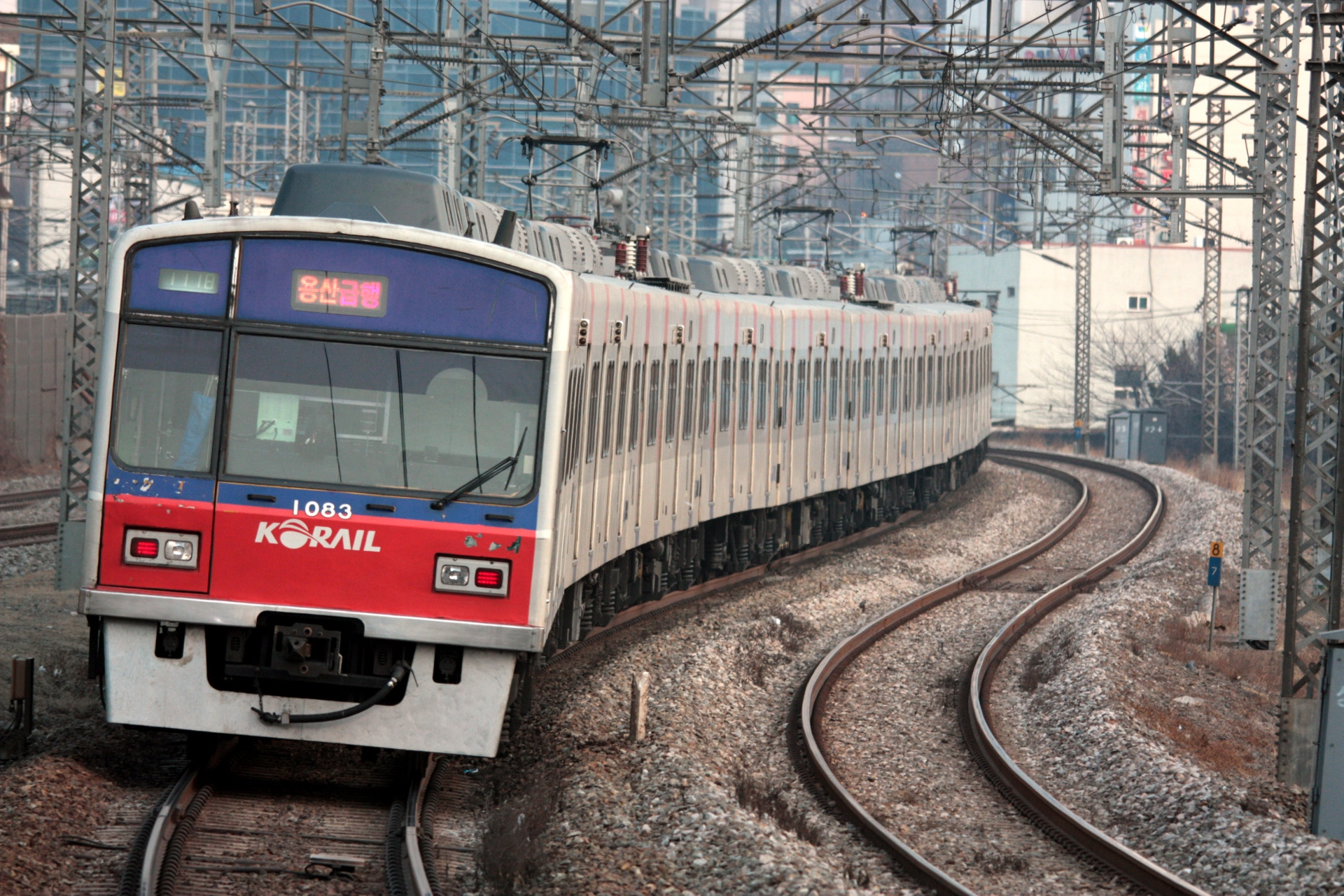
3rd batch train 1-83 leaving Singil station

Trains 1-74~1-81 and 1-83~1-86 were third generation trains and were introduced from 1994 to 1997. They were introduced to supply more trains to Line 1. Many additional 3rd generation cars were built to lengthen second generation trains.

The trains share a similar front end design with the Class 341000 and 351000 trains (as their front ends were derived from those trains' designs), but are otherwise identical to the other Class 1000 trains, especially the second generation. Therefore, they only operate with other Class 1000 cars. All trains were delivered in the old Korean National Railroad (KNR) livery but they have received new livery following overhaul. The cars were nicknamed the new rheostat cars (신저항).

==== Batch 1 ====
The first batch of 3rd generation trains consisted of train 1-74~1-79. The cars were manufactured from 1994 to 1995 by Daewoo Heavy Industries under model "DEC-13." All new trains are ten cars long; six additional cars were built to lengthen second generation trains 1-59~1-61 from four to six cars for Ansan Line service.

All of train 1-74 sans the driving cars (made excessive when 2nd generation train 1-62 was retired) and the additional cars for trains 1-59~1-61 were retired between 2015 and 2016. Two powered cars from train 1-79 were retired in March 2019 because of mechanical issues; as a result, two 2nd generation powered cars were temporarily brought back into service to replace those cars. Trains 1-75~1-79 were replaced by the Class 311000 trains, retired in mid-November 2019, and scrapped by August 2020. The driving cars of train 1-74 were retired in May 2020 and were scrapped by November 2021.

==== Batch 2 ====
The second batch of 3rd generation trains consisted of train 1-80, 1-81, and 1-83~1-86. The cars were manufactured from 1996 to 1997 by Hyundai Precision. Train 1-80 was built as a ten-car train, trains 1-81 and 1-83 were originally eight-car trains, and trains 1-85 and 1-86 utilized older trains as only two driving cars for each train were manufactured. Many additional cars were built to lengthen second generation trains 1-50~1-53 and 1-57~1-63, along with rebuilt train 1-82; trains 1-50~1-53 and 1-59~1-61 were lengthened to ten cars, while trains 1-57, 1-58, 1-62, and 1-63 were lengthened from four to six cars.

Eight of the additional cars were retired in 2017 when second generation train 1-64 was retired and were scrapped by August 2020. All other cars in the 2nd batch of third generation trains were expected to be fully retired by 2021, but after a derailment involving train 1-83 in April 2020, the remaining trains were removed from service by June 2020 due to perceived safety issues. All cars were stored out of service except for part of train 1-86, which was used at Guro Depot as a shunter. The cars began to be scrapped in October 2021.

== Refurbishments ==
- In 1986, the 1st batch cars' air conditioning secondary power device was upgraded from a motor generator to stationary inverters (SIV). These inverters were replaced by new IGBT inverters in 2004 for cars that were overhauled. The air conditioner itself was changed from piston-based systems to screw-motor-based systems.
- In 1988, the 1st batch cars were retrofitted with air conditioning.
- In 2000, station notifier systems were installed in the 2nd batch trains to allow train operators to know which stations to stop at during express train runs.
- The Daegu subway fire compelled Korail to introduce flame-resistant interiors for passenger safety. As a result, from 2004, the 2nd batch trains (except 1-53, 1-57, 1-63, and 1-65) and 3rd batch trains were overhauled with fire-retardant interiors. SLS overhauled some of the 1st batch cars, most of the 2nd batch trains and a few 3rd batch cars. Meanwhile, Rowin overhauled 2nd batch trains 1-62, 1-64, and all other 3rd batch cars. The original Mylar roll film front destination signs, side destination signs, and run number indicators were replaced with LED displays (trains 1-42~1-48 received LCD run number indicators). All trains received the new Korail livery.
- In 2006, trains 1-47~1-49 received newer Korail EMU doors. Additionally, trains 1-45, 1-50~1-56, 1-61, and 1-71 received 1st batch train doors. Many remaining trains are receiving 1st batch train doors as their original doors fail in operation.
- In 2011, all trains from train 1-59 had their speakers rebuilt or replaced to allow for clearer announcements.

== Preservation ==
After retirement, a handful of Class 1000 cars were either preserved or repurposed into facilities such as restaurants and pension trains.

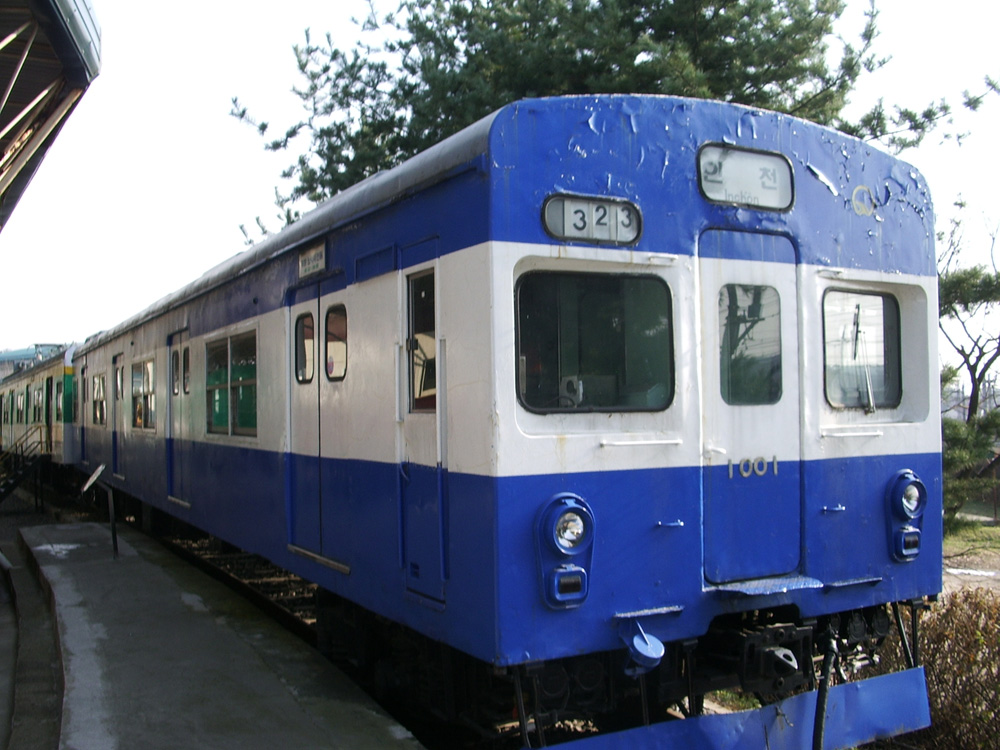
1st batch car 1001 at Korean Railroad Museum

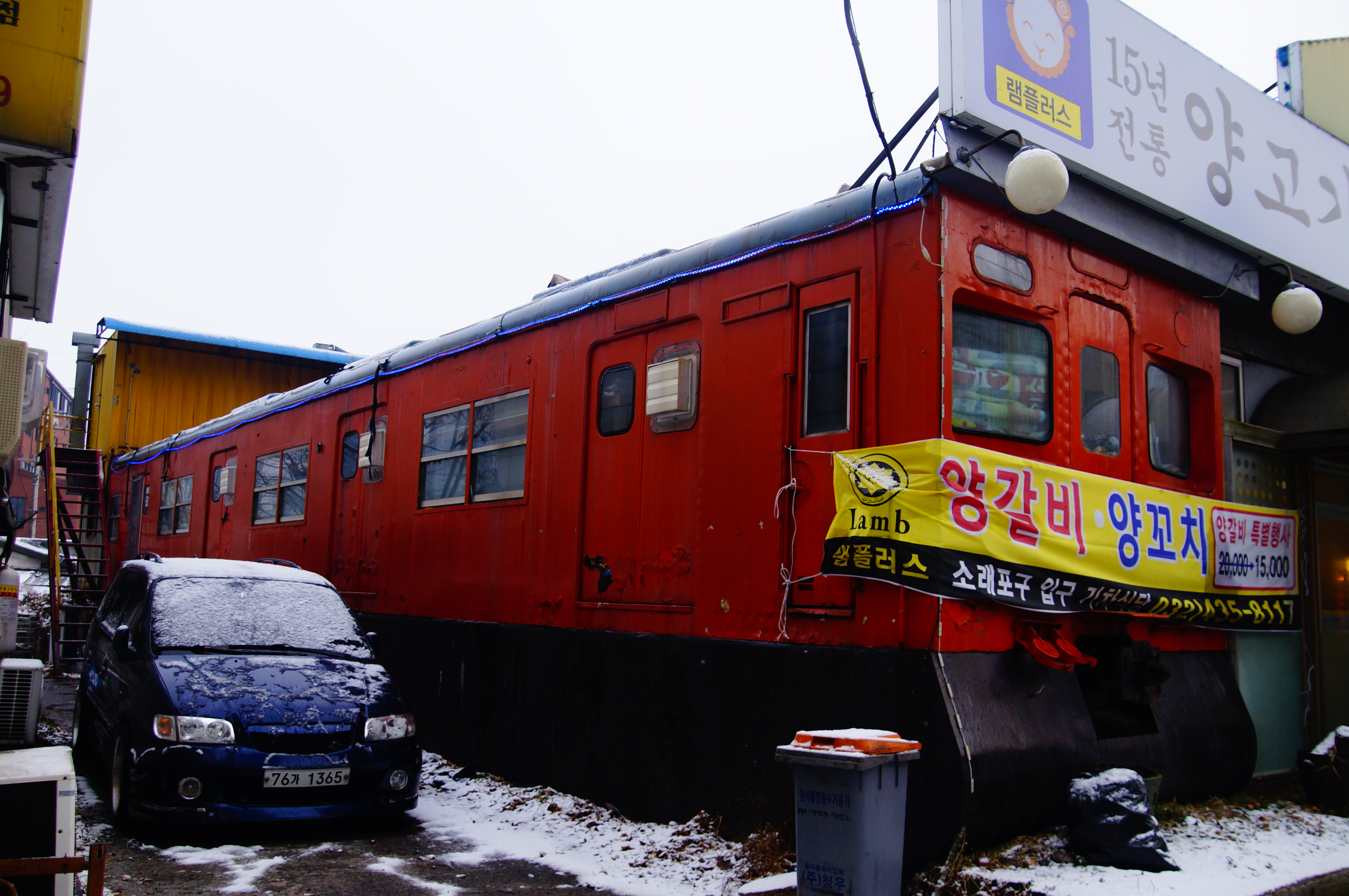
1st batch car 1106, which was used as a local restaurant in Incheon until 2015.

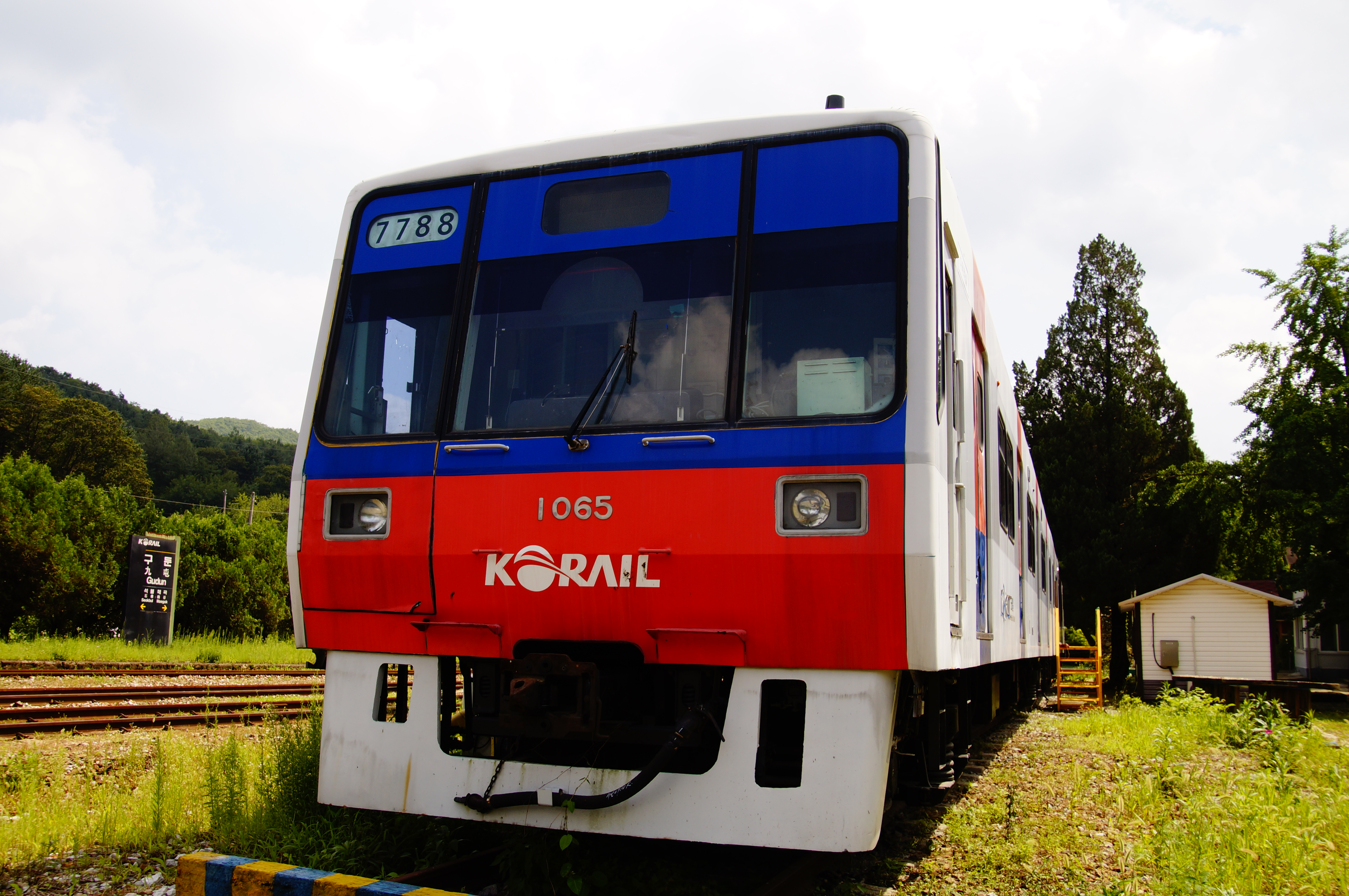
2nd batch car 1065 at the old Gudun Station, now used as a training car.

Preserved first generation cars include (though not limited to):

- 1001, 1115 (pictured) and 1315, used as exhibits at the Korean Railroad Museum in Uiwang. Car 1001 is part of the first Japan-built Korean EMU, while cars 1115 and 1315 are part of the first Korea-built Korean EMU. When cars 1115 and 1315 were preserved, they were renumbered to 1001 and 1301, conflicting with the true 1001.
- 1405 and another car, used as a part of a local facility in Seongnam-si near the Galma Tunnel.
- 1107 and 1011, used as karaoke room cars at Mogok Leisure Town in Hongcheon, Gangwon-do.
- 1309, used as a restaurant in Buan County, Jeollabuk-do.
- 1019 and 1119, used for storage space Sangju-si, Gyeongsangbuk-do.
- Rebuilt car 1188 (renumbered from 1929), used as a training car for the ROK Special Forces.

Preserved second generation cars include:

- 1065 (pictured) and 1165 at the old Gudun station on the old Jungang Line alignment.
- 1771 and 1171, used as training cars at Kyungbuk College in Yeongju-si, North Gyeongsang Province.

The only third generation car preserved is 1181, which is at Dongmokpo station on the old Honam Line alignment.

== See also ==
- Korail
- Seoul Subway Line 1
- Korail Class 311000 - the replacements of all Class 1000 trains
