= Anyang station =

Station of the Seoul Metropolitan Subway

Coordinates: 37°24′08″N 126°55′21″E

안양
Anyang
안양; Anyang
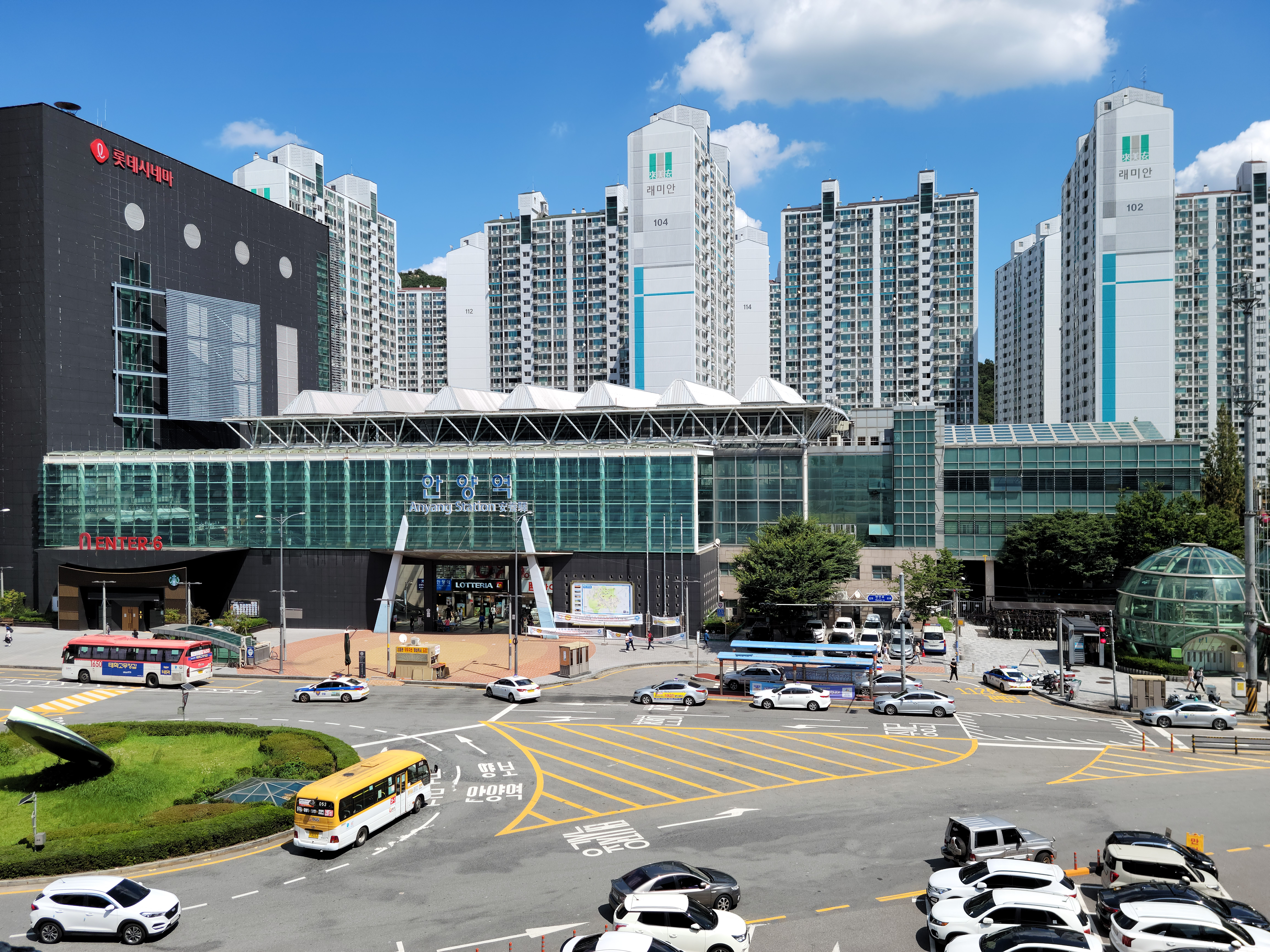

Korean name
- Hangul: 안양역
- Hanja: 安養驛
- RR: Anyang-yeok
- MR: Anyang-yŏk

General information
- Location: 88-1 Anyang 1-dong, 232 Mananno, Manan-gu, Anyang-si, Gyeonggi-do
- Operator: Korail
- Line: Line 1
- Platforms: 2
- Tracks: 4

Construction
- Structure type: Ground

History
- Opened: January 1, 1905

Key dates
- 15 August 1974: Line 1 opened

Passengers
- (Daily) Based on Jan-Dec of 2012. KR: 1,728; Line 1: 58,877

Services
Preceding station	Seoul Metropolitan Subway	Following station
Gwanak towards Kwangwoon University	Line 1	Myeonghak towards Seodongtan or Sinchang
Geumcheon-gu Office towards Cheongnyangni	Line 1 Gyeongbu Express	Geumjeong towards Sinchang
Geumcheon-gu Office towards Seoul	Line 1 Gyeongbu Express	Gunpo towards Sinchang
Preceding station	Korail	Following station
Yeongdeungpo towards Seoul	ITX-Saemaeul Gyeongbu Line	Suwon towards Busan
Yeongdeungpo towards Yongsan	ITX-Maum Janghang Line	Suwon towards Hongseong
Yeongdeungpo towards Seoul	Mugunghwa-ho Gyeongbu Line	Suwon towards Busan
Yeongdeungpo towards Yongsan	Mugunghwa-ho Honam Line	Suwon towards Gwangju or Mokpo
Yeongdeungpo towards Yongsan	Mugunghwa-ho Janghang Line	Suwon towards Iksan
Yeongdeungpo towards Yongsan	Mugunghwa-ho Jeolla Line	Suwon towards Yeosu-Expo
Yeongdeungpo towards Seoul	Chungbuk Yeongdong Gugak Wine Train	Suwon towards Yeongdong
Location

Anyang Station (Korean: 안양역) is a ground-level subway station on Line 1 of the Seoul Metropolitan Subway. The station is located in the Anyang One neighborhood, in Manan District, Seoul. The station's sole exit offers access to Enter-6 Mall, which occupies the same building. Travel time from Anyang Station to Seoul Station on Line 1 is approximately 40 minutes. Anyang Station is the main station in Anyang, but there are another six stations in Anyang, namely Beomgye, Pyeongchon and Indeogwon on Line 4, and Myeonghak, Gwanak and Seoksu on Line 1, though the latter's platforms lie within Seoul. It is connected with Lotte Dapartment Store.

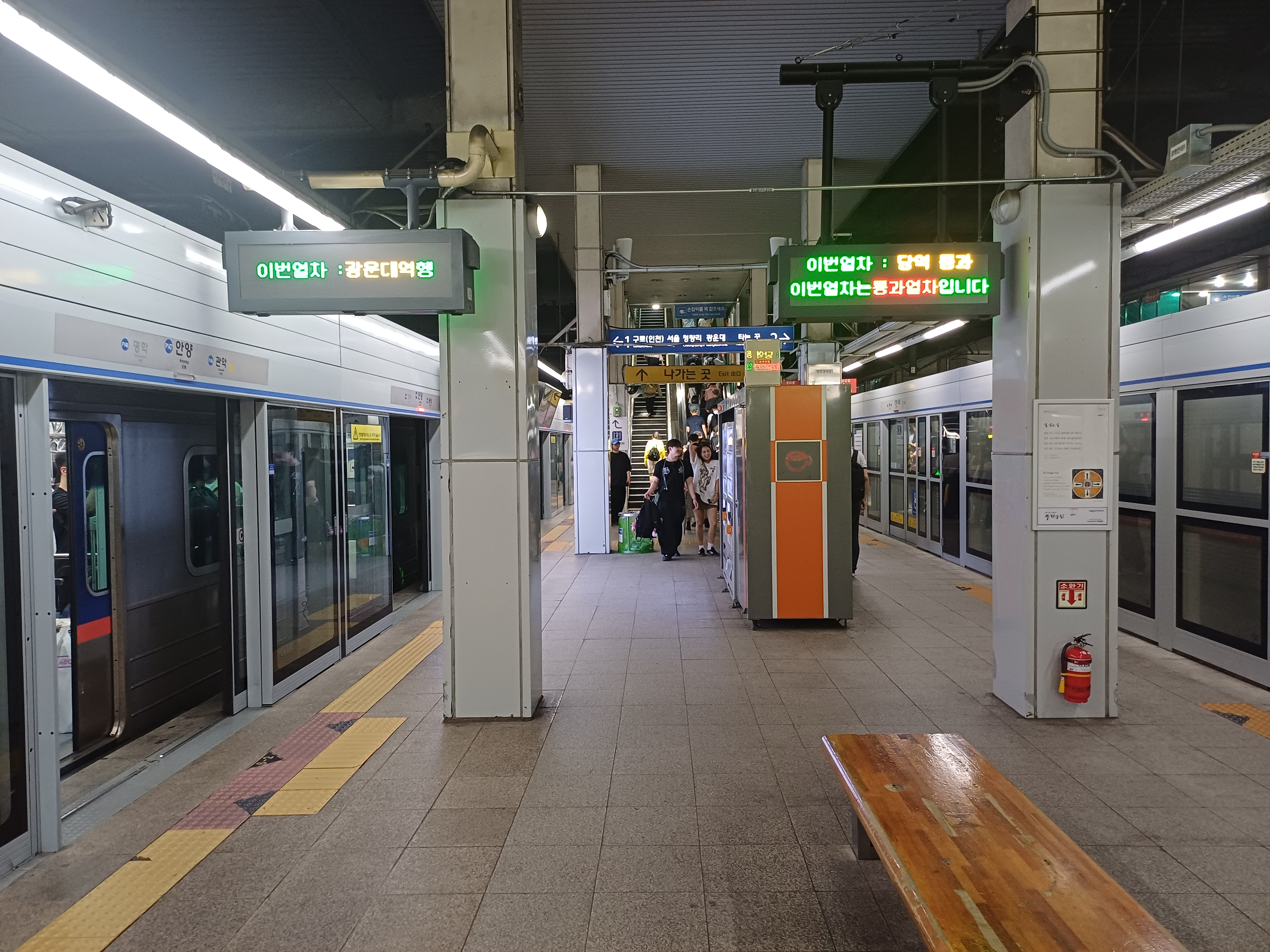
Line 1 platforms

== Station layout ==
=== Korail platforms ===
Seoul Subway Line 1 · Gyeongbu Line platforms (Ground)

↑Gwanak(Line 1)/↑Yeongdeungpo(Gyeongbu Line)
| | | 2 | | 3 | | |
| | | 12 | | 34 | | |
Myeonghak(Line 1)↓/Suwon(Gyeongbu Line)↓

1	Line 1	Local	For Gwanak · Geumcheon-gu Office · Guro · Jongno 3(sam)-ga · Kwangwoon Univ.
1	Line 1	A Express	For Geumcheon-gu Office · Guro · Yeongdeungpo · Yongsan
2	Gyeongbu Line	Mugunghwa-ho	For Yeongdeungpo · Yongsan · Seoul
2	Line 1	B Express	For Geumcheon-gu Office · Yeongdeungpo · Seoul
3	Gyeongbu Line·Honam Line; Jeolla Line·Janghang Line	Mugunghwa-ho	For Busan · Dongdaegu · Daejeon · Mokpo · Gwangju · Yeosu-Expo · Iksan
3	Line 1	B Express	For Gunpo · Uiwang · Sungkyunkwan Univ. · Suwon · Byeongjeom · Cheonan
4	Line 1	Local	For Byeongjeom · Seodongtan · Cheonan · Sinchang
4	Line 1	A Express	For Suwon · Byeongjeom · Cheonan · Sinchang

== History ==
Anyang Station opened as a stop-off on the Gyeongbu Line, which it remains today, on January 1, 1905. On August 15, 1974, services on the Seoul Subway began stopping at Anyang. The current station building was completed in December 2001, and three years later, on January 20, 2005, express subway services from Seoul to Suwon began calling at Anyang.

== Services ==
The first train of the day weekdays (not including national holidays) is at 5.31 a.m. northbound and 5.17 a.m. southbound, while the last is at 12.12 a.m. northbound and 12.02 a.m. southbound. Northbound trains have various destinations. Some terminate at Guro, some at Dongmyo, others at Cheongnyangni, while some continue as far as Kwangwoon University. None, however, continue beyond Kwangwoon University, so if travel beyond is required, it is necessary to change trains. Some southbound trains terminate at Byeongjeom, while the remainder continue to Cheonan.

== Vicinity ==
- Exit 1 : Manan Elementary
- Exit 2 : Yangmyeong High, Daewoo apartment
