= Gasan Digital Complex station =

Train station in South Korea

Coordinates: 37°28′54″N 126°52′57″E

가산디지털단지 (마리오아울렛); Gasan Digital Complex (Mario Outlet)
가산디지털단지 (마리오아울렛); Gasan Digital Complex (Mario Outlet)
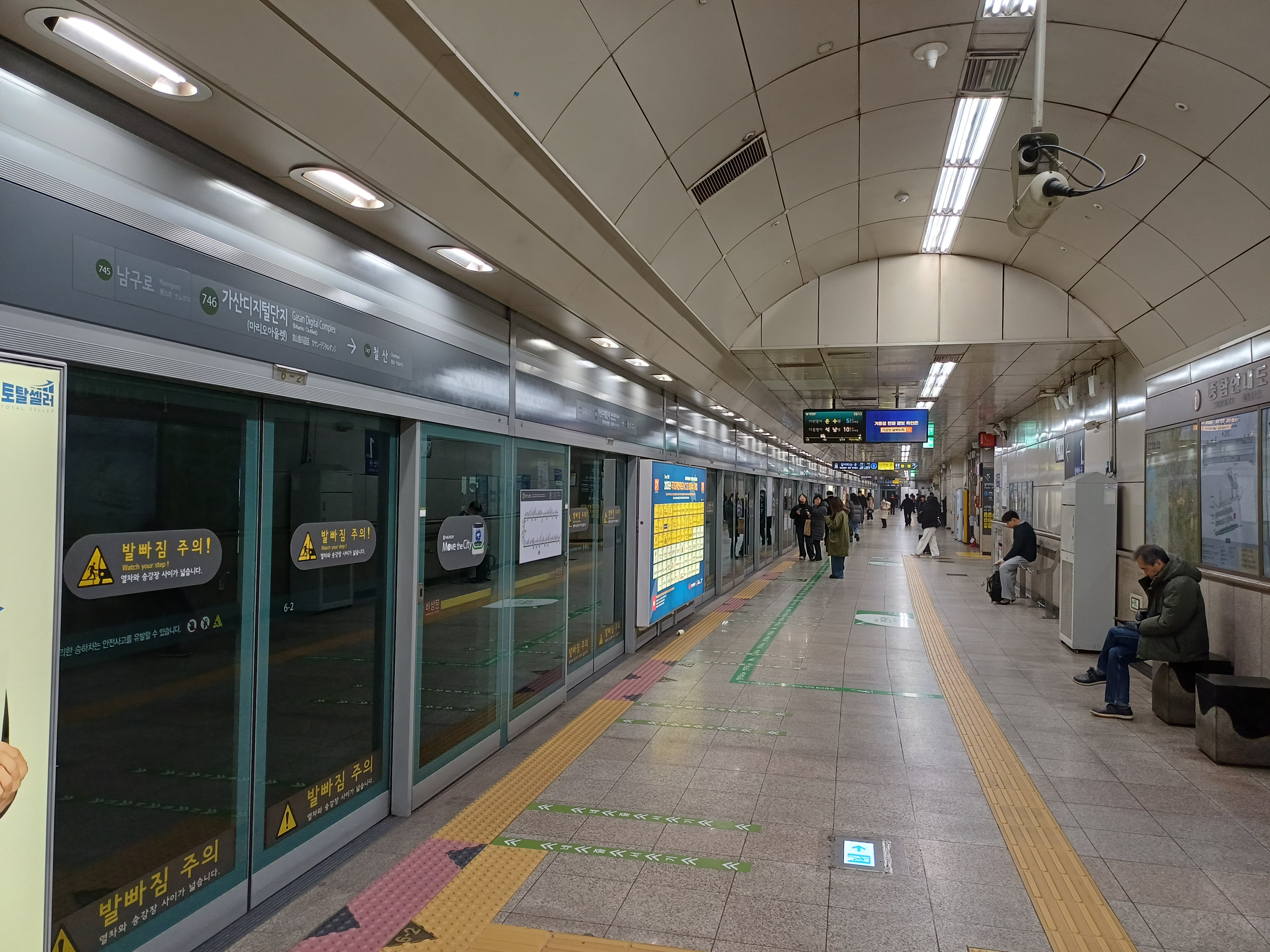
- Station platform (Line 7)

Korean name
- Hangul: 가산디지털단지역
- Hanja: 加山디지털團地驛
- Revised Romanization: Gasandijiteoldanji-yeok
- McCune–Reischauer: Kasandijitŏldanji-yŏk

General information
- Location: 468-4 Gasan-dong, Geumcheon-gu, Seoul
- Operator: Korail; Seoul Metro
- Lines: Line 1 Line 7
- Platforms: 4
- Tracks: 4

History
- Former names: Garibong (until 2005)

Key dates
- August 15, 1974: Line 1 opened
- February 29, 2000: Line 7 opened

Passengers
- (Daily) Based on Jan-Dec of 2012. Line 1: 36,075; Line 7: 72,436
Location

Gasan Digital Complex station (Korean: 가산디지털단지역) is on Gyeongbu Line and Seoul Subway Lines 1 and 7. Its former name was Garibong. The Line 7 platform is the busiest station in Korea at rush hour.

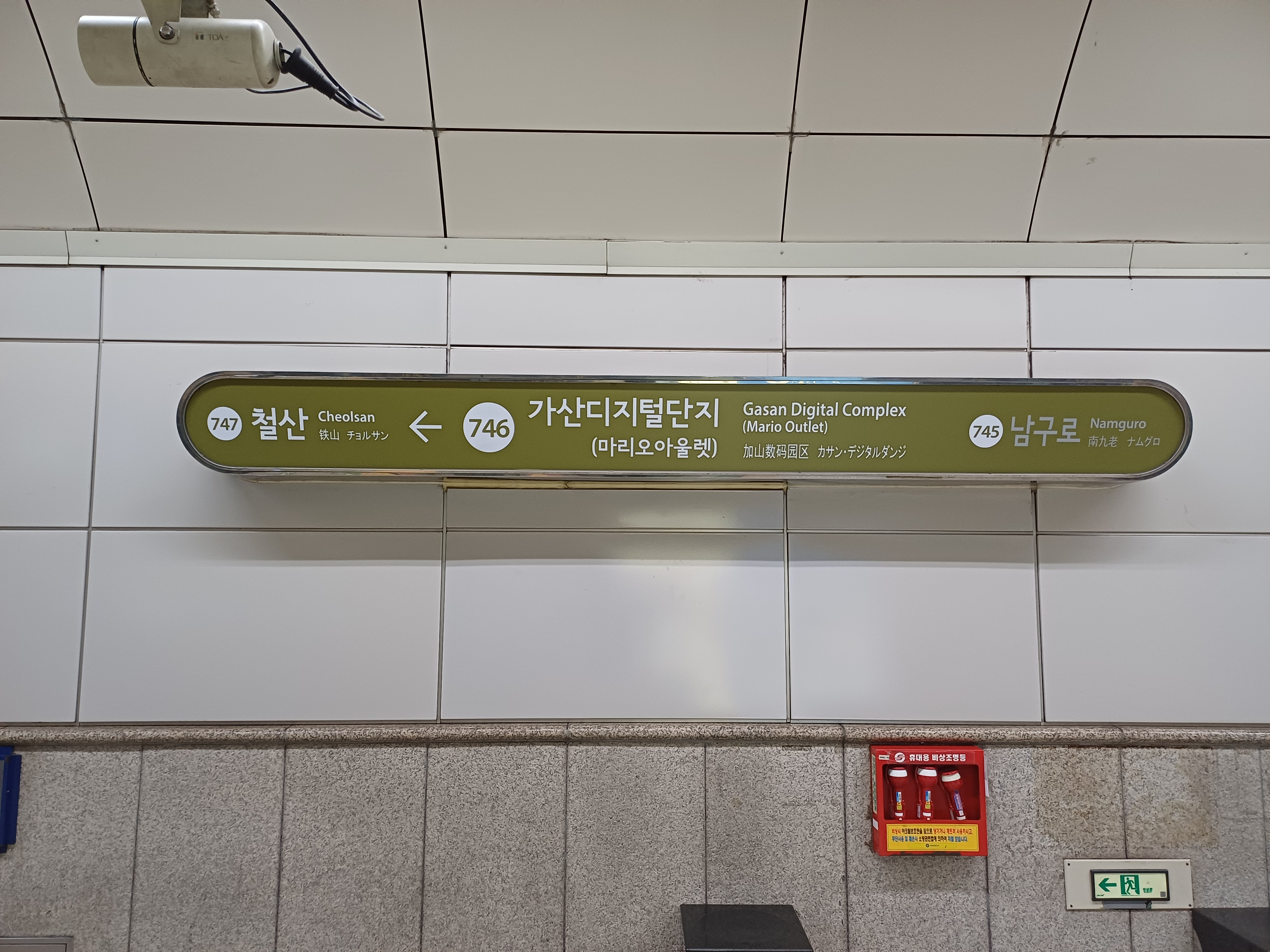
Station nameplate (Line 7)

== Station layout ==
=== Line 1 ===
↑ Guro
1 | | | | 2
Doksan ↓

1	● Line 1 toward Kwangwoon University →
2	● Passing track →
3	← ● Passing track
4	← ● Line 1 toward Seodongtan or Sinchang

=== Line 7 ===
Namguro ↑
S/B | | N/B
↓ Cheolsan

Southbound	← ● Line 7 toward Seongnam
Northbound	● Line 7 toward Jangam →

Preceding station	Seoul Metropolitan Subway	Following station
Guro towards Kwangwoon University	Line 1	Doksan towards Seodongtan or Sinchang
Guro towards Cheongnyangni	Line 1 Gyeongbu Express	Geumcheon-gu Office towards Sinchang
Guro towards Yeongdeungpo	Line 1 Gwangmyeong Shuttle Service	Doksan towards Gwangmyeong
Namguro towards Jangam	Line 7	Cheolsan towards Seongnam
