= Geumcheon District =

District of Seoul, South Korea

Geumcheon
- Autonomous District
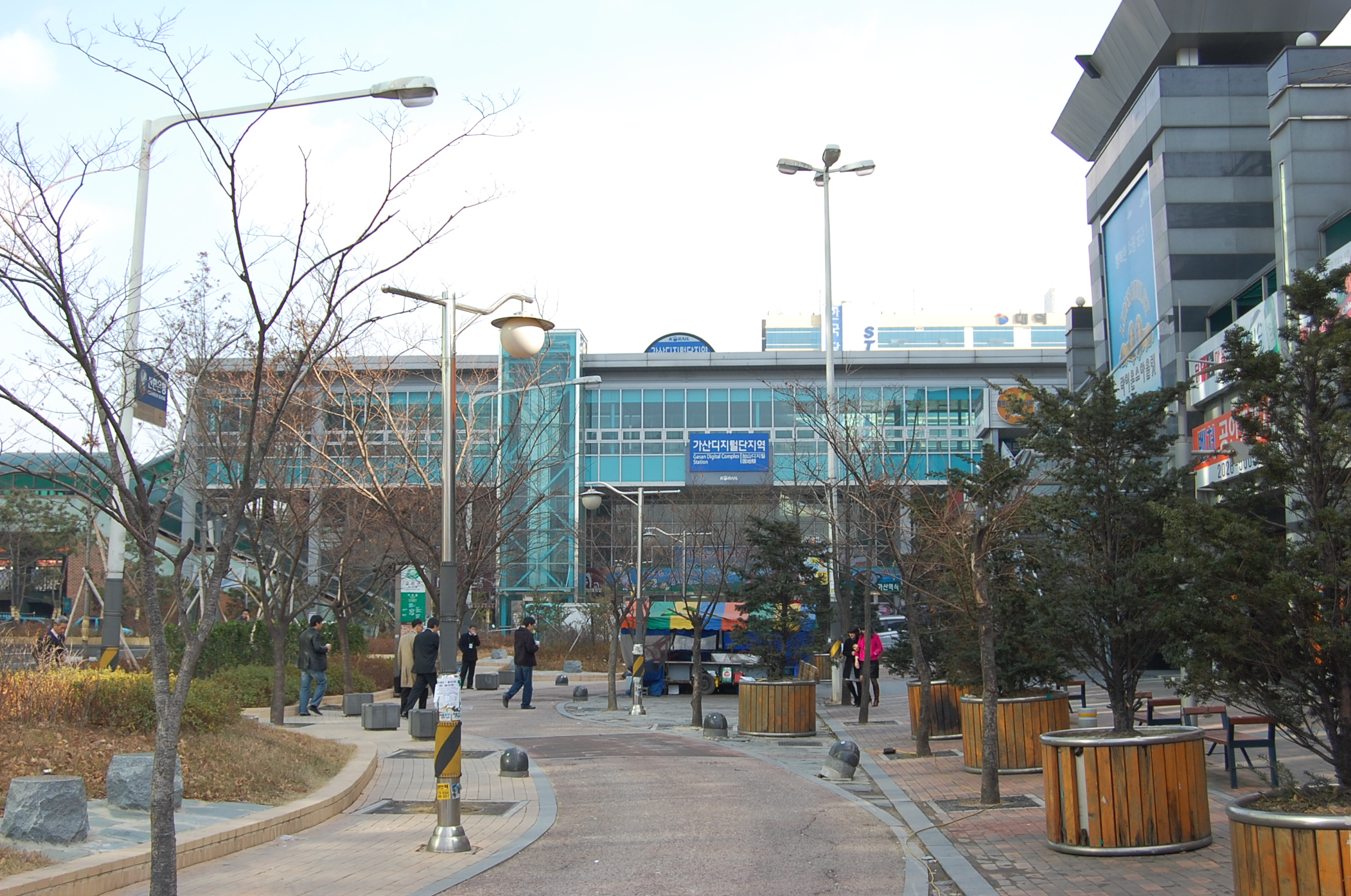
- In front of Gasan Digital Complex Station

- Flag

- Location of Geumcheon District in Seoul
- Interactive map of Geumcheon
- Coordinates: 37°27′6.67″N 126°54′7.33″E
- Country: South Korea
- Region: Sudogwon
- Special City: Seoul
- Administrative dong: 12

Government
  - Body: Geumcheon-gu Council
  - Mayor: Choi Ki-chan (Democratic)
  - MNA: Choi Ki-sang (Democratic)

Area
  - Total: 13.01 km^{2} (5.02 sq mi)

Population (2010)
  - Total: 242,510
  - Density: 18,640/km^{2} (48,280/sq mi)
- Time zone: UTC+9 (Korea Standard Time)
- Postal code: 08500 – 08699
- Area code(s): +82-2-800~
- Website: Geumcheon District official website

Korean name
- Hangul: 금천구
- Hanja: 衿川區
- RR: Geumcheon-gu
- MR: Kŭmch'ŏn-gu

Geumcheon District (Korean: 금천구) is one of the 25 gu (districts) of Seoul, South Korea. It was created from southern parts of Guro District and tiny sections from Gwangmyeong in 1995. Its district office is located in front of Siheung Station, now Geumcheon District Office Station, in Siheung-dong.

Geumcheon District is located in the southwest corner of the city, south of the Han River. It is bordered on the west by the Anyang River, and partially on the east by Gwanak Mountain, a dominating part of Seoul's southern skyline.

Many technology companies are housed in Geumcheon District and several large headquarters are located here, albeit the income level of Seoulites here is lower than average. The Gyeongbu railway from Seoul Station to Busan station passes through, as well as Seoul Subway Lines 1 and 7.

The mayor of this district has been Cha Sung-su (차성수) since July 2010.

== Administrative divisions ==
Administrative divisions

- Gasan-dong (가산동 加山洞)
- Doksan-dong (독산동 禿山洞)
- Siheung-dong (시흥동 始興洞)

== Transportation ==
=== Railroad ===
- Korail

- Seoul Subway Line 1 (Gyeongbu Line)

(Guro-gu) ← Gasan Digital Complex—Doksan—Geumcheon-gu Office (formerly Siheung Sta.) → (Anyang)

- Seoul Metropolitan Rapid Transit Corporation

- Seoul Subway Line 7

(Guro-gu) ← Gasan Digital Complex → (Gwangmyeong)

== Educational institutions ==
- Universities Graduate Schools
  - Seoul University of Buddhism
- Highschools
  - Geumcheon Highschool
  - Doksan Highschool
  - Dongil Girls' Highschool
  - Dongil Girls' Commercial Highschool
  - Moonil Highschool
  - Traditional Arts Highschool
- Lifelong Education
  - Geongil Management Information Highschool

== See also ==
- Gwanaksan
