= Geumcheon-gu Office station =

Train station in South Korea

Coordinates: 37°27′20″N 126°53′39″E

금천구청; Geumcheon-gu Office
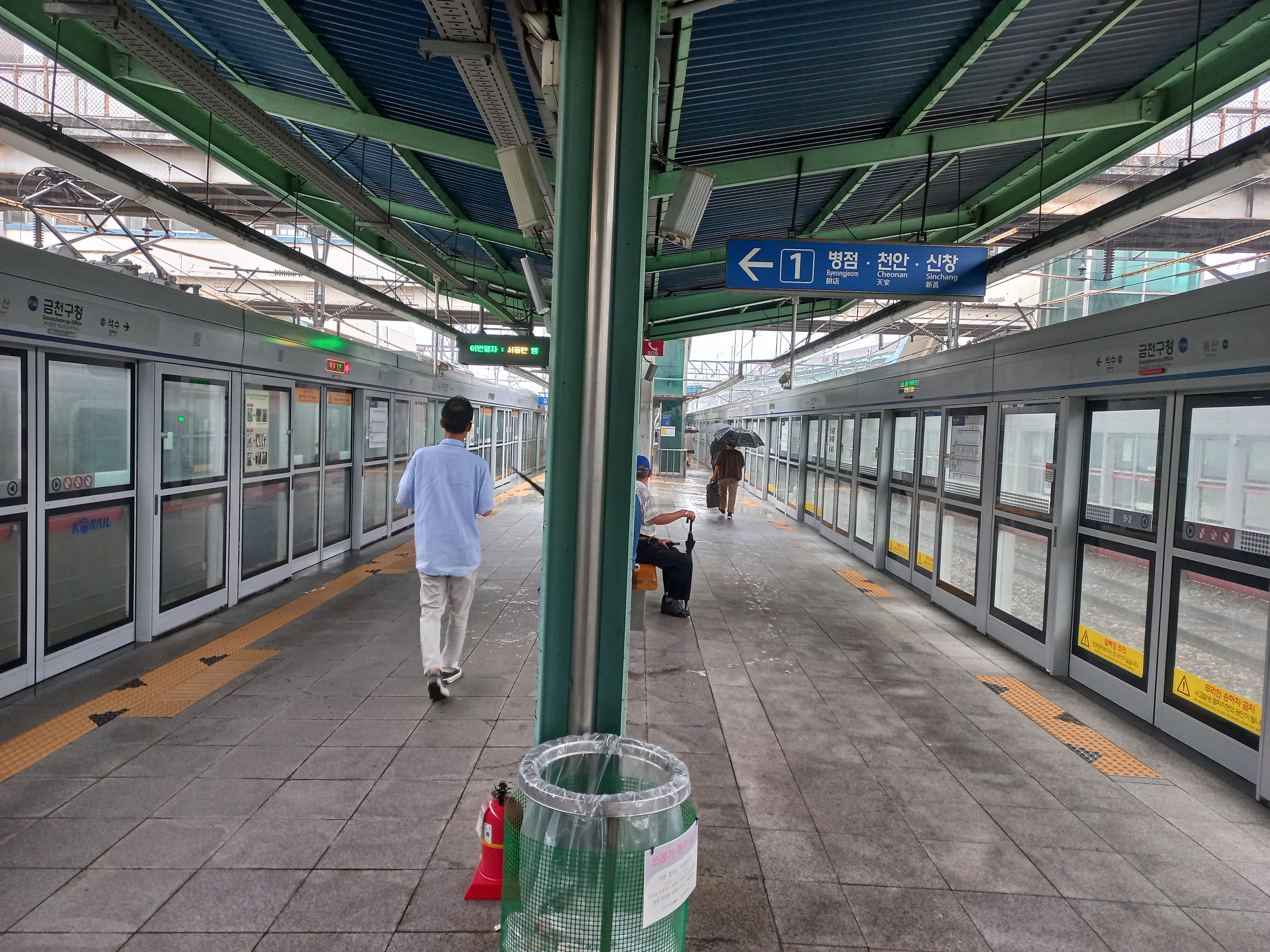
- Station platforms

Korean name
- Hangul: 금천구청역
- Hanja: 衿川區廳驛
- Revised Romanization: Geumcheon-gucheong-yeok
- McCune–Reischauer: Kŭmch'ŏn'guch'ŏng-yŏk

General information
- Location: 113-54 Siheung 1-dong, 91 Siheungdaero 63 gil, Geumcheon-gu, Seoul
- Operator: Korail
- Lines: Gyeongbu Line; Gyeongbu high-speed railway Siheung Interconnection
- Platforms: 4
- Tracks: 4

Construction
- Structure type: Aboveground

History
- Opened: April 1, 1908
- Former names: Siheung

Key dates
- August 15, 1974: Line 1 opened

Passengers
- (Daily) Based on Jan-Dec of 2012. Line 1: 23,408

Services
Preceding station	Seoul Metropolitan Subway	Following station
Doksan towards Kwangwoon University	Line 1	Seoksu towards Seodongtan or Sinchang
Gasan Digital Complex towards Cheongnyangni	Line 1 Gyeongbu Express	Anyang towards Sinchang
Yeongdeungpo towards Seoul	Line 1 Gyeongbu Express	Anyang One-way operation
Seoul One-way operation	Line 1 Gyeongbu Express	Anyang towards Sinchang
Doksan towards Yeongdeungpo	Line 1 Gwangmyeong Shuttle Service	Gwangmyeong Terminus
Location

Geumcheon-gu Office Station, formerly known as Siheung Station, (Korean: 금천구청역) is a station on the Line 1 of the Seoul Subway, as well as the Gyeongbu Line. Commuter rail trains on Line 1 travel southwards from here to Anyang, Suwon, Pyeongtaek and Cheonan Stations via the Gyeongbu Line.

In addition, a spur line (also a part of Line 1) between this station and Gwangmyeong Station on the KTX serves to link high-speed trains and commuter rail.

The name of the station was changed from Siheung to its current name on December 29, 2008. The main reason for the change was because of the confusion with Siheung, a city located southwest of here.

== Gallery ==
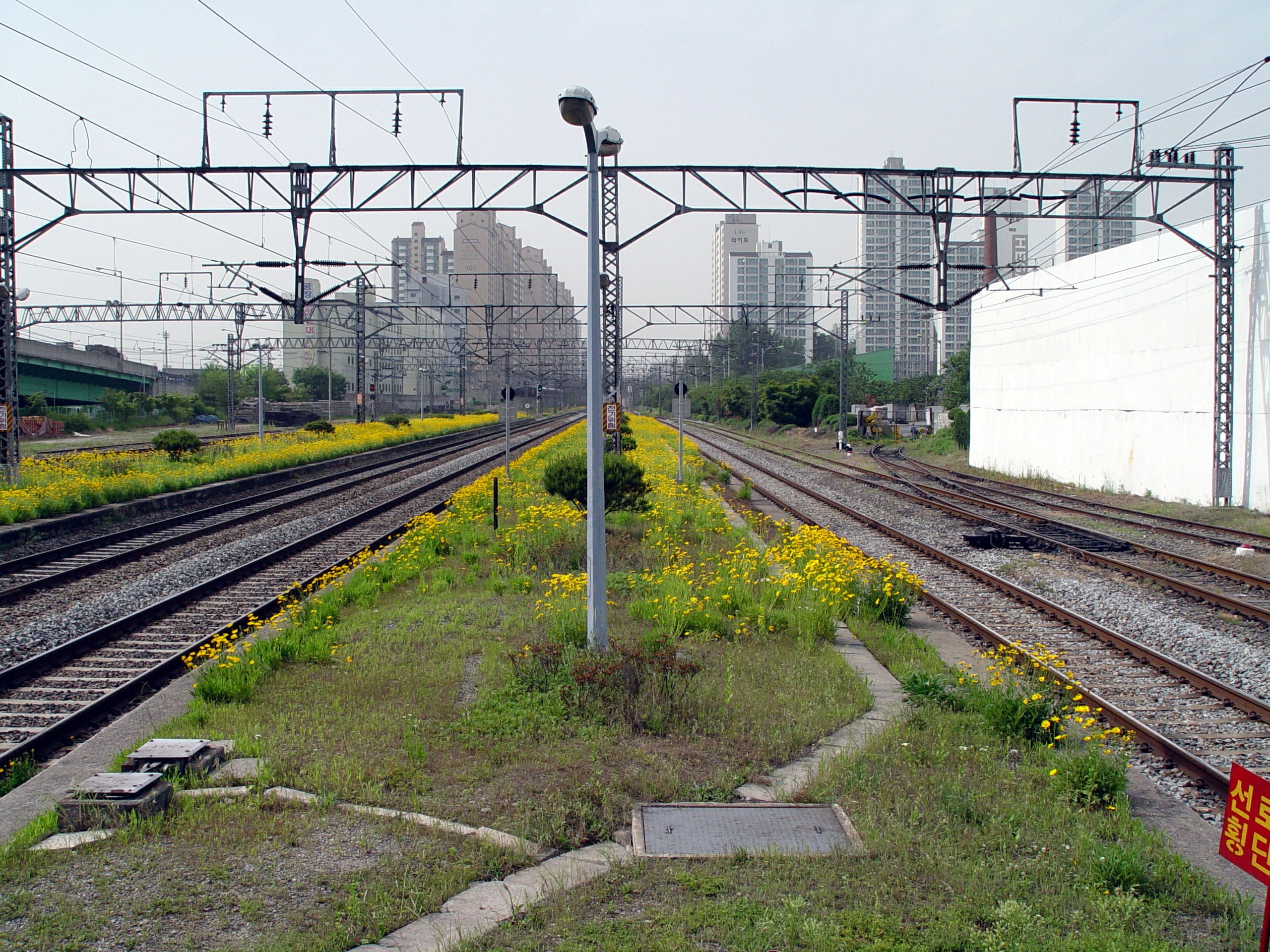
Looking north along the tracks

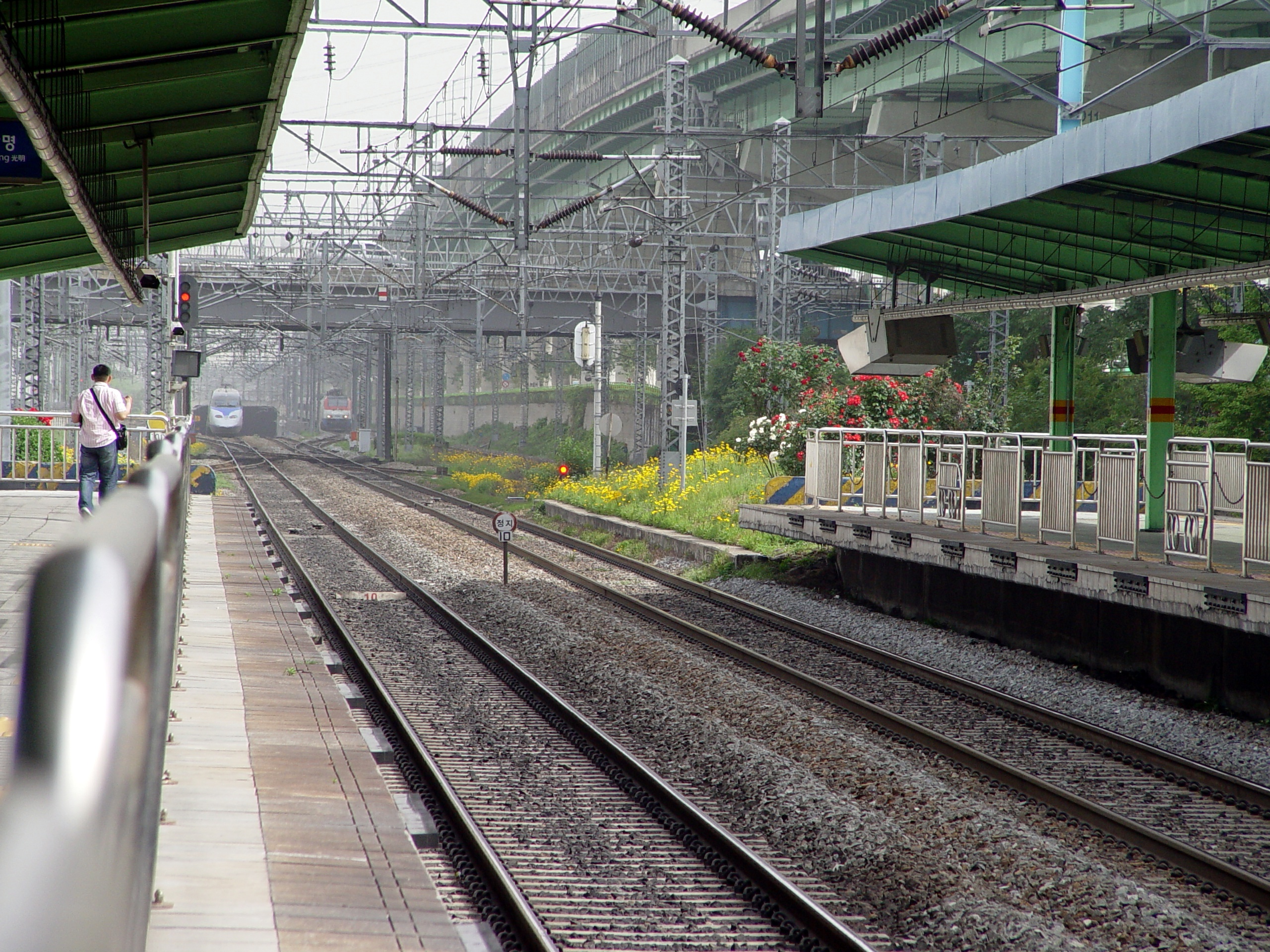
Southbound KTX entering tunnel south of platforms while northbound train on the Gyeongbu Line approaches
