= Seoul University of Buddhism =

University in Seoul, South Korea

Seoul University of Buddhism (Korean: 서울불교대학원대학교) is a university and graduate school in South Korea. It is headquartered in Geumcheon-gu, Seoul Metropolitan City and was established in 2002.
