= Gwanak station =

Subway station in Seoul, South Korea

Coordinates: 37°25′08″N 126°54′33″E

관악 (안양예술공원); Gwanak (Anyang Art Park)
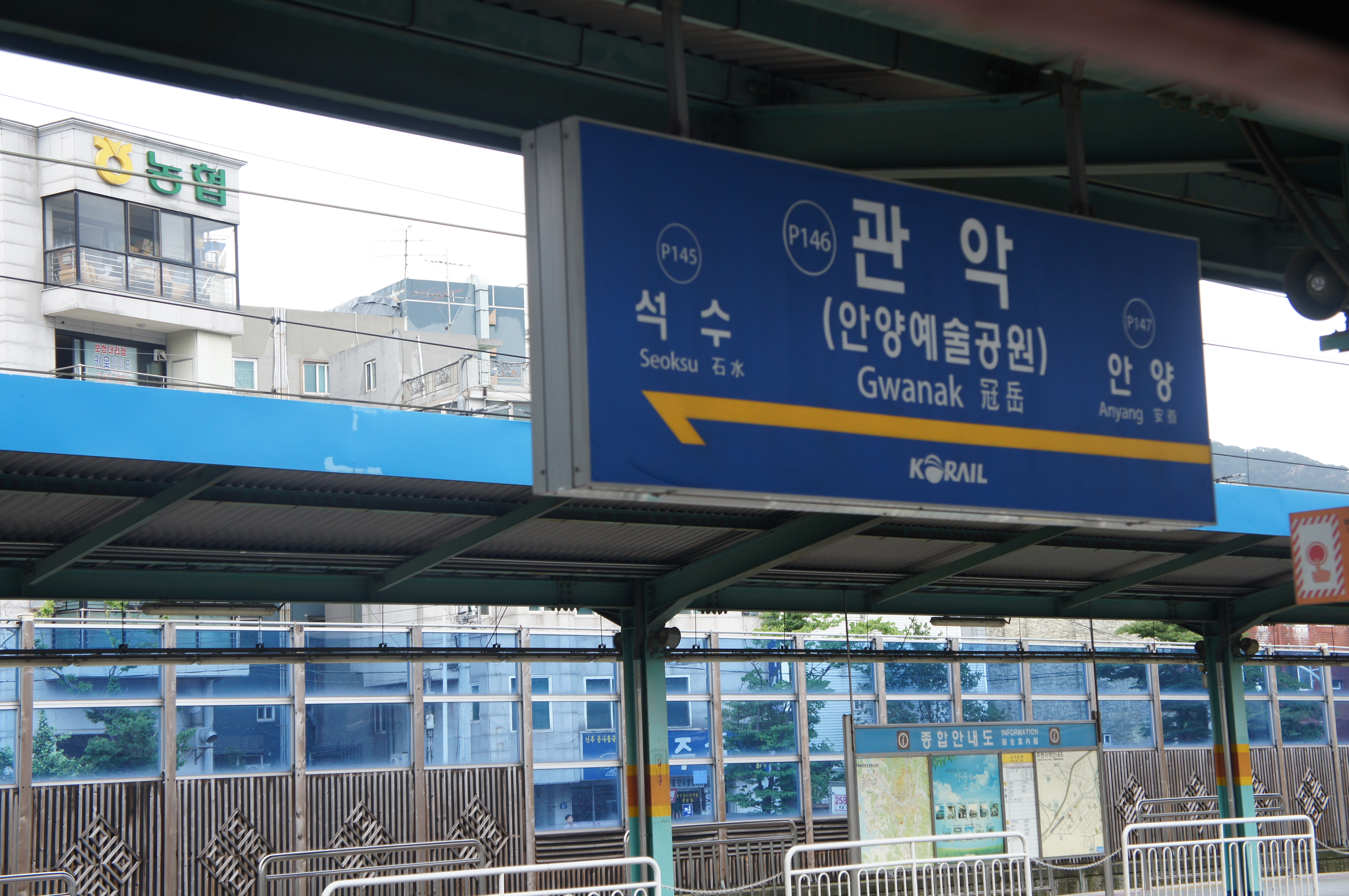

Korean name
- Hangul: 관악역
- Hanja: 冠岳驛
- RR: Gwanak-yeok
- MR: Kwanak-yŏk

General information
- Location: 110-21 Seoksu 1-dong, 46 Gyeongsudaero 1273 Bongil, Manan-gu, Anyang-si, Gyeonggi-do
- Operator: Korail
- Line: Line 1
- Platforms: 2
- Tracks: 4

Construction
- Structure type: Aboveground

Key dates
- August 15, 1974: Line 1 opened

Passengers
- (Daily) Based on Jan-Dec of 2012. Line 1: 16,748
Location

Gwanak Station is a station on the Seoul Subway Line 1 and the Gyeongbu Line. It takes its name from Gwanaksan, a mountain to the northeast. Despite its name, this station is not in Gwanak-gu, located north of here.

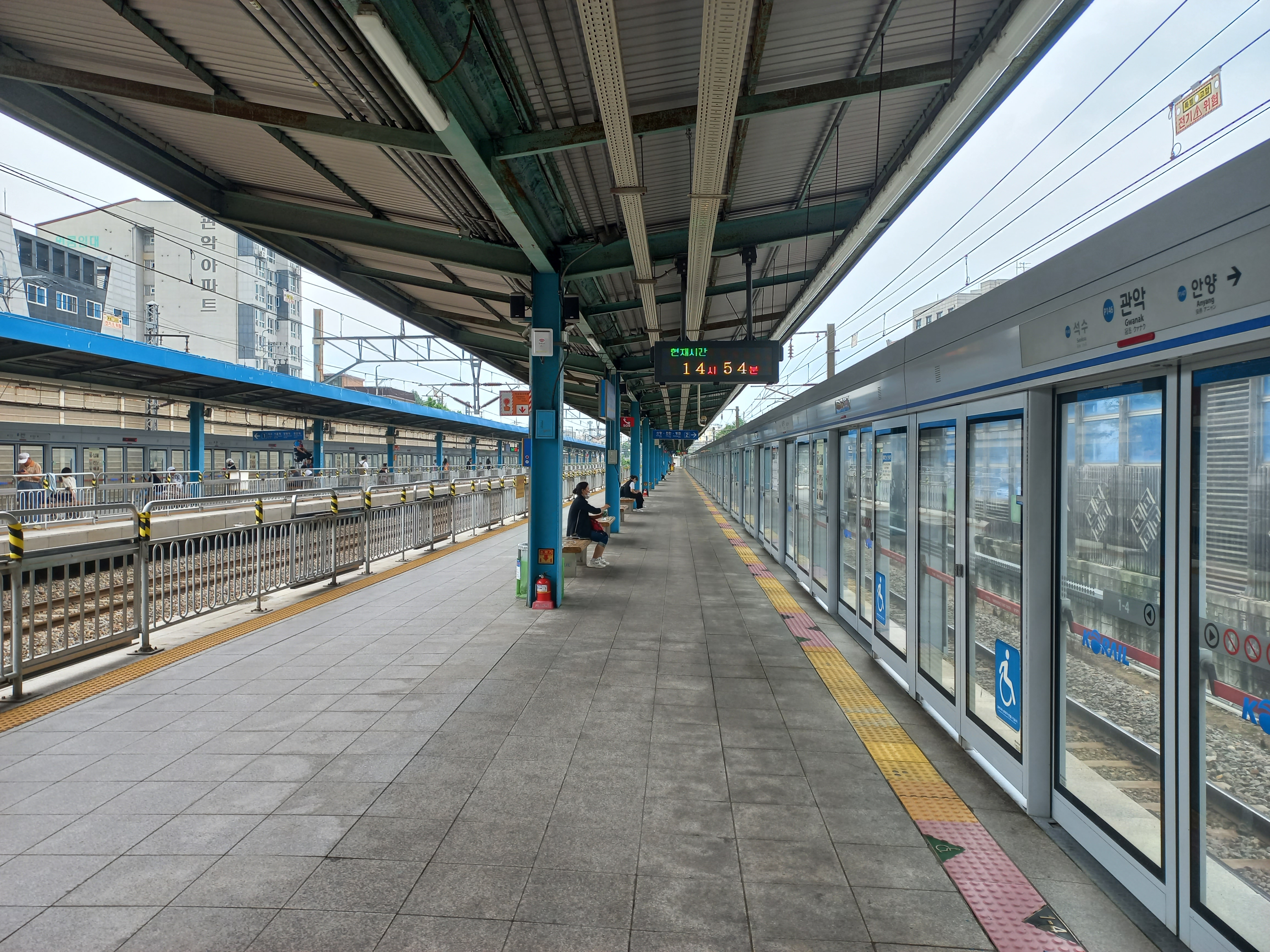
Platform

Preceding station	Seoul Metropolitan Subway	Following station
Seoksu towards Kwangwoon University	Line 1	Anyang towards Seodongtan or Sinchang
