= Doksan-dong =

Coordinates: 37°28′N 126°54′E

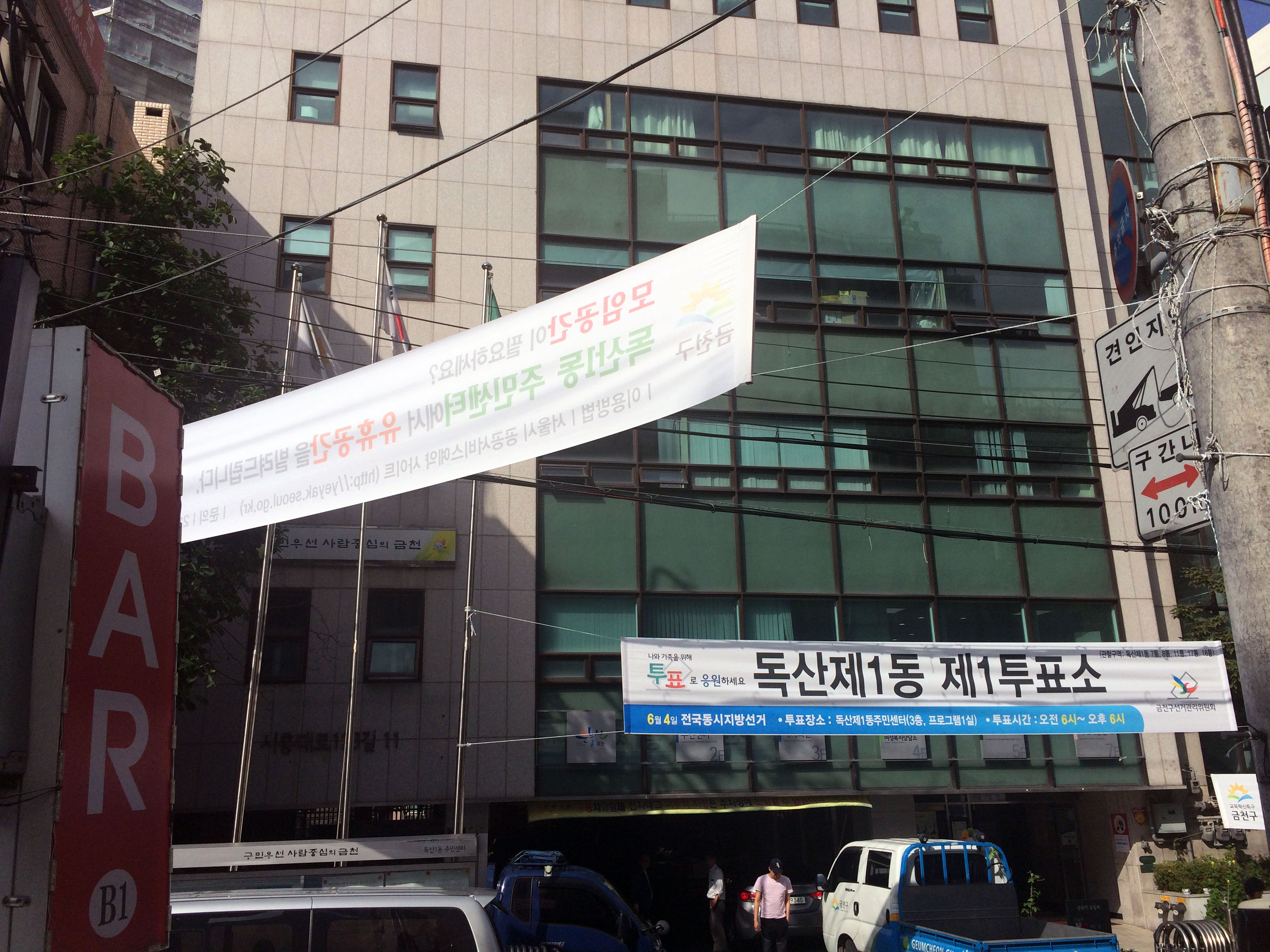
- Doksan 1-dong Community Service Center (Geumcheon-gu)
- Interactive map of Doksan-dong
- Country: South Korea

Area
  - Total: 4.2 km^{2} (1.6 sq mi)

Population (2001) 27717
  - Total: 116,410
  - Density: 8,682/km^{2} (22,490/sq mi)

Korean name
- Hangul: 독산동
- Hanja: 禿山洞
- RR: Doksan-dong
- MR: Toksan-dong

Doksan-dong (Korean: 독산동) is a dong (neighborhood) of Geumcheon District, Seoul, South Korea.

== Overview ==
The name "Doksan" (독산, 禿山) literally means "bald mountain," referring to a hill in the area that was once devoid of trees, giving it the appearance of a "bare mountain." According to a record by Gang Hui (강희) in the Sinjeung Dongguk Yeoji Seungnam (Newly Augmented Survey of the Geography of Korea), "Behind my house is a mountain, but it is a bare mountain. Therefore, people call it Doksan. Originally, there were trees, but because it is located outside the Hanseong city limits, the trees were cut down with axes and eaten by cattle and goats, leaving it bare."

Gang Hui was a descendant of General Gang Gam-chan from the Goryeo dynasty. Although the exact years of his birth and death are unknown, his passing of the civil service examination (mun-gwa) in 1439, the 21st year of King Sejong's reign, places him in the early to mid-Joseon period. This suggests that the name "Doksan" has been in use since at least that time or earlier. Gang Hui’s ancestral home was Geumcheon (衿川), and his pen name was also Doksan (禿山).

Historical maps mark the current area around Hanul Middle School (formerly Daerim Girls' Middle School) as Mungyo-ri (문교리). On April 27, 1911, Mungyo-ri was incorporated into Doksan-ri. Later, on January 1, 2008, Doksanbon-dong was merged into Doksan 3-dong.

== See also ==
- Administrative divisions of South Korea
