= SS 1000 class =

SS 1000 class Indonesian State Railways C53 class
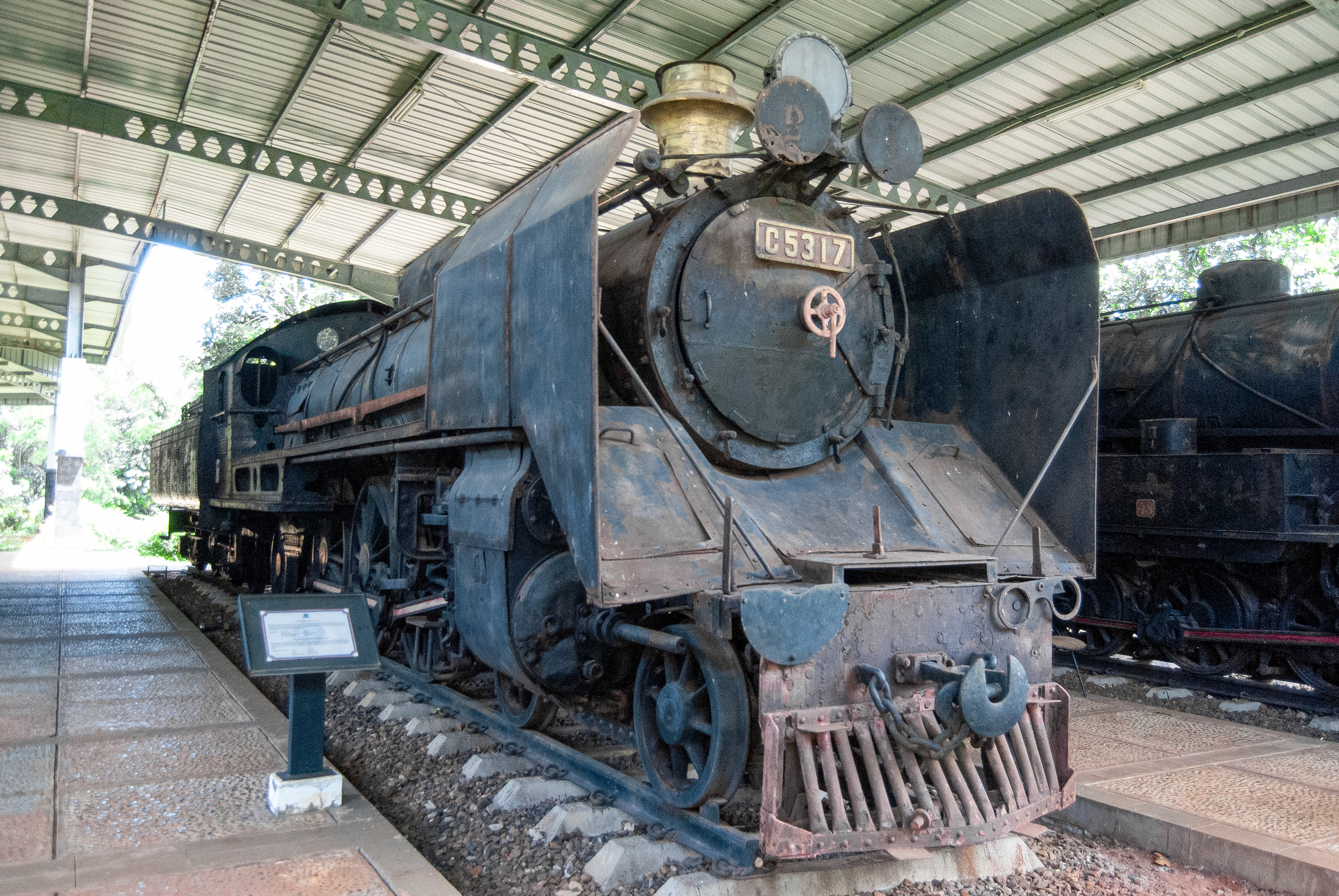
- C53 17 at the Transportation Museum in Taman Mini Indonesia Indah (TMII).
Type and origin
- Power type: Steam
- Builder: Werkspoor
- Serial number: 392–403, 488–495
- Build date: 1917–1922
- Total produced: 20
Specifications
- Configuration
  - Whyte: 4-6-2 Pacific
  - UIC: 2′C1′ h4v
- Gauge: 1,067 mm (3 ft 6 in)
- Driver dia.: 1,600 mm (5 ft 3 in)
- Length: 20,792 mm (68 ft 2 5/8 in)
- Height: 3,710 mm (12 ft 2 in)
- Axle load: 12.5 t (12.3 long tons; 13.8 short tons)
- Adhesive weight: 37.5 t (36.9 long tons; 41.3 short tons)
- Loco weight: 66.5 t (65.4 long tons; 73.3 short tons)
- Firebox
  - Grate area: 2.7 m^{2} (29 sq ft)
- Boiler pressure: 14 kg/cm^{2} (13.7 bar; 199 psi)
- Heating surface: 123 m^{2} (1,320 sq ft)
- Superheater
  - Heating area: 43 m^{2} (460 sq ft)
- Cylinders: Four
- High-pressure cylinder: 340 mm × 580 mm (13 3/8 in × 22 13/16 in)
- Low-pressure cylinder: 520 mm × 580 mm (20 1/2 in × 22 13/16 in)
Performance figures
- Maximum speed: 90 km/h (56 mph)
- Power output: 1,200 PS (883 kW; 1,180 hp)
Career
- Operators: Staatsspoorwegen; Indonesian State Railways
- Numbers: 1001–1020 later C53 01–C53 20
- Locale: Java
- First run: 1918
- Disposition: One preserved, remainder scrapped

The SS 1000 class, later reclassified as the C53 class, are a class of 20 4-6-2 four-cylinder passenger steam locomotives built by Werkspoor in the Netherlands for Staatsspoorwegen, the state-owned railway of Dutch East Indies. It measured 20,792 mm (68 ft 2.6 in) in length, weighs 109.19 t (120.4 short tons; 107.5 long tons), and has a power rating of 1,200 hp (890 kW) with a top speed of 90 km/h (56 mph). They were initially numbered SS 1001-1020. The class were kept in service despite the Staatsspoorwegen considering the class problematic in operation, being used to haul express trains until the early 1950s.

== Design and operational history ==
During the Dutch colonial administration, nighttime passenger train services were considered unsafe because of concern for natural threats in the tropical environment; consequently, trains had to stop midway for the night before resuming their journey after dawn. The distance between Jakarta and Surabaya was around 820 km (510 mi) and powerful locomotives were needed to complete the rail journey before sunset.

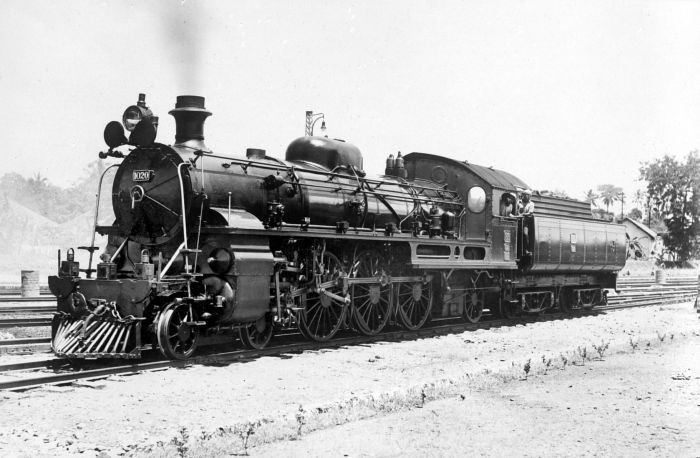
SS 1020 (C53 20) in the years of the Staatsspoorwegen.

Therefore, the SS 1000 class were built by Werkspoor in the Netherlands between 1918 and 1922 in a batch of 20 locomotives. They were used on express trains such as the Eendaagsche Express and the Nacht Express, which first ran on 1 November 1929 and 1 November 1936 respectively. The travel time of the Eendaagsche Express, when introduced, was 13 hours and 30 minutes, which was later shortened to 11 hours and 27 minutes in 1939.

Werkspoor designed the locomotives as four-cylinder compound locomotives as a way to bolster the Staatsspoorwegen's fleet. During testing, problems were discovered that affected the performance of the class, as Werkspoor was inexperienced at building four-cylinder compound locomotives. Around ten years after being introduced, smoke deflectors were fitted to the 1000 class to drift smoke away so as not to obscure the driver's vision.

The four-cylinder compound arrangement was expected to provide the locomotive stability when running at high speeds, but its performance was less than satisfactory, being prone to buffeting and rough riding at speeds above 90 km/h (56 mph). In 1931, the 1000s shook violently while running at 100 km/h (62 mph). Despite the high maintenance and operating costs, the Staatsspoorwegen retained these locomotives for its express trains, cutting journey times between Jakarta and Surabaya from 29 hours to 12 hours and 20 minutes. The average speed between the two cities was now 75.8 km/h (47.1 mph), with trains even topping up 120 km/h (75 mph) in operation. During the Japanese occupation of the Dutch East Indies, the 1000 class were redesignated as the C53 class.

By the 1970s, the C53s, most of which were allocated to Sidotopo depot, were relegated to local passenger and freight services, having been replaced by diesel locomotives. Only one locomotive, C53 17, has been preserved and is on display at Taman Mini Indonesia Indah's Transportation Museum.

== Gallery ==
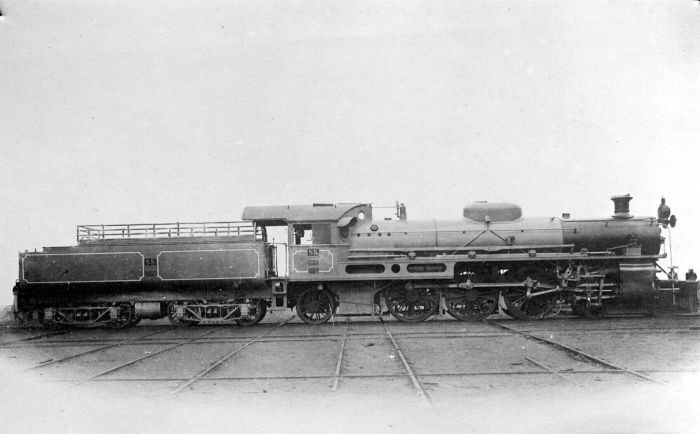
Werkspoor works photo of an SS 1000 class

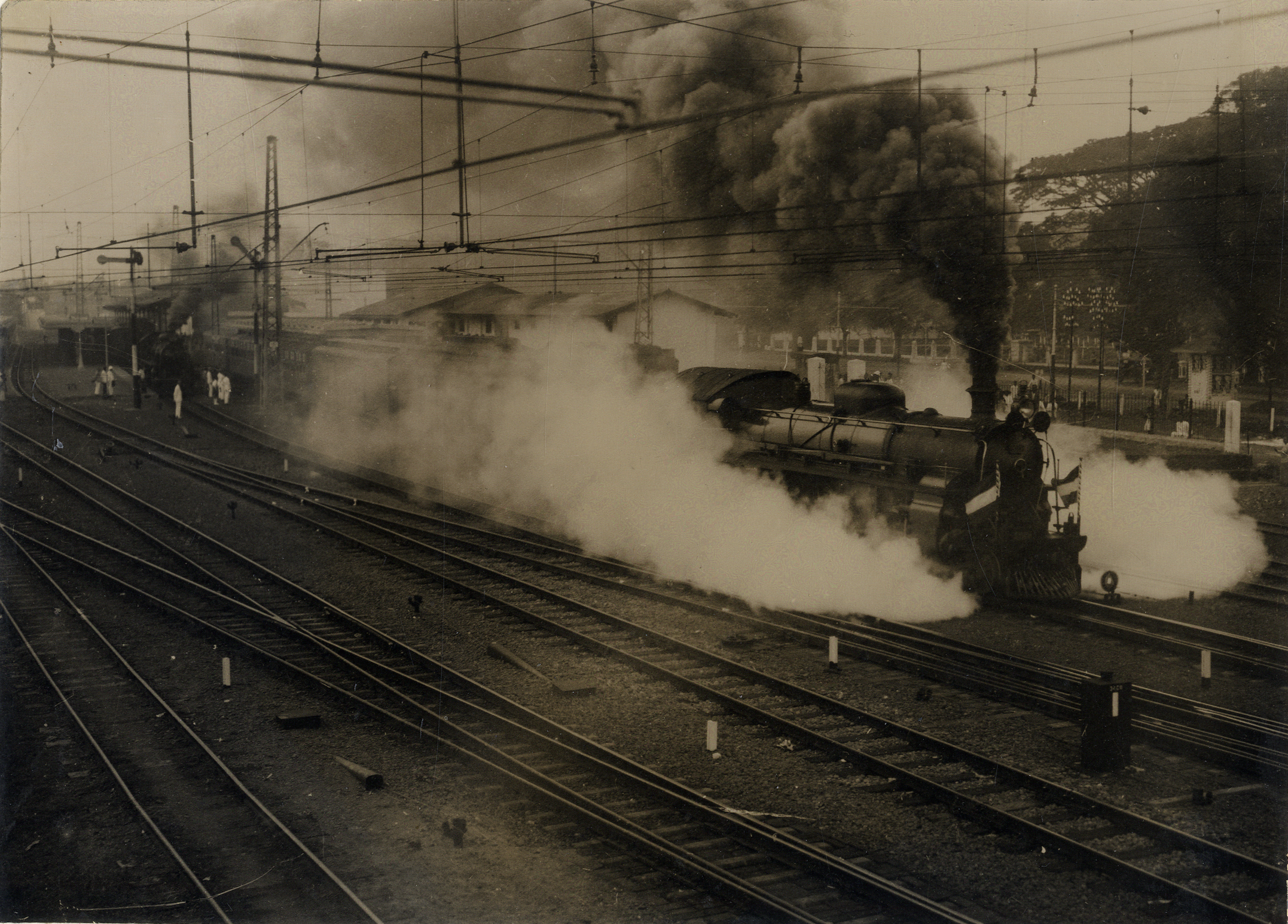
An SS 1000 class hauling the first Eendaagsche Express in November 1929

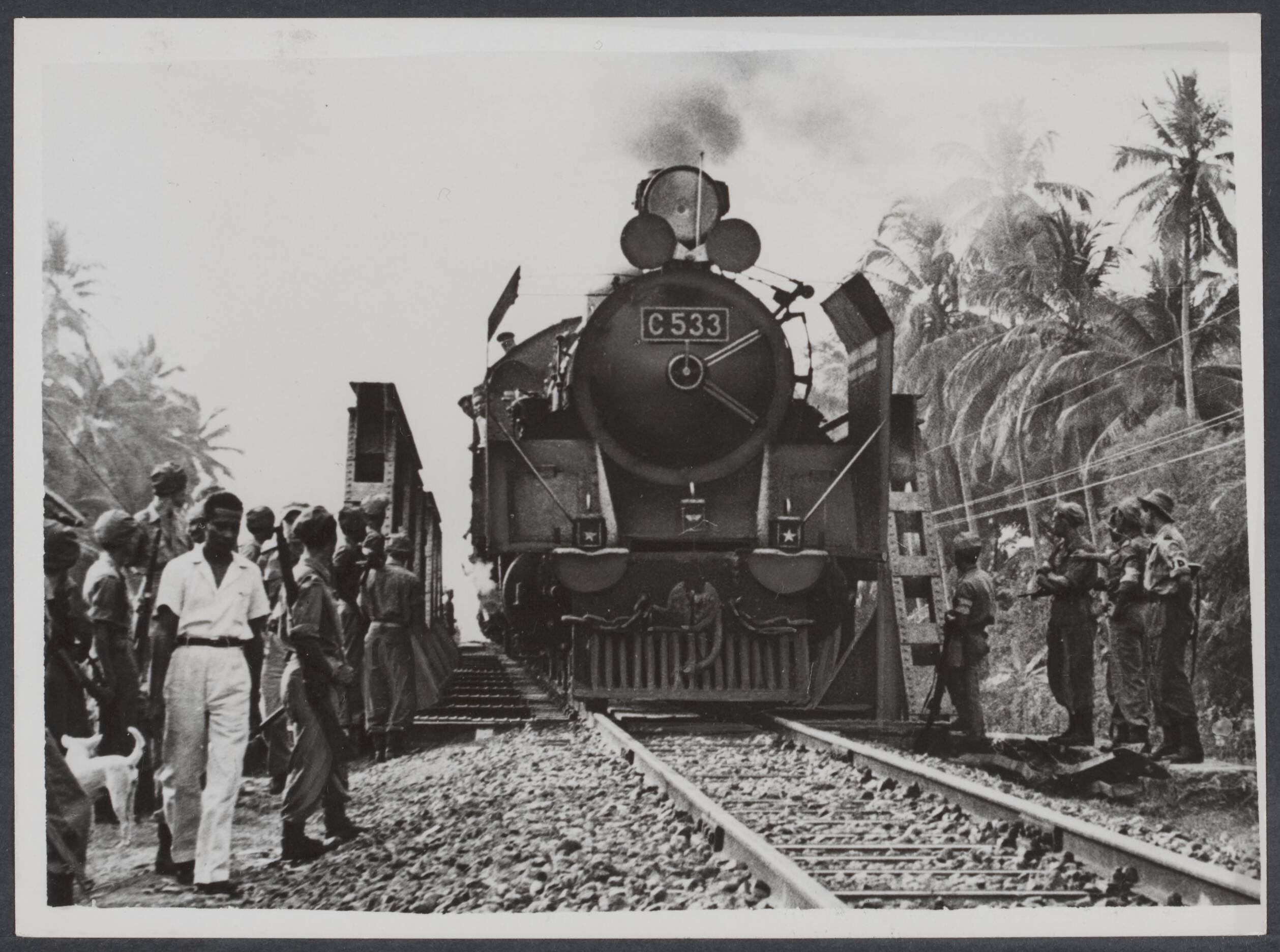
C53 05 pulling a train which carries the members of the United Nations Trilateral Commission, December 1948
