= Gasan-dong =

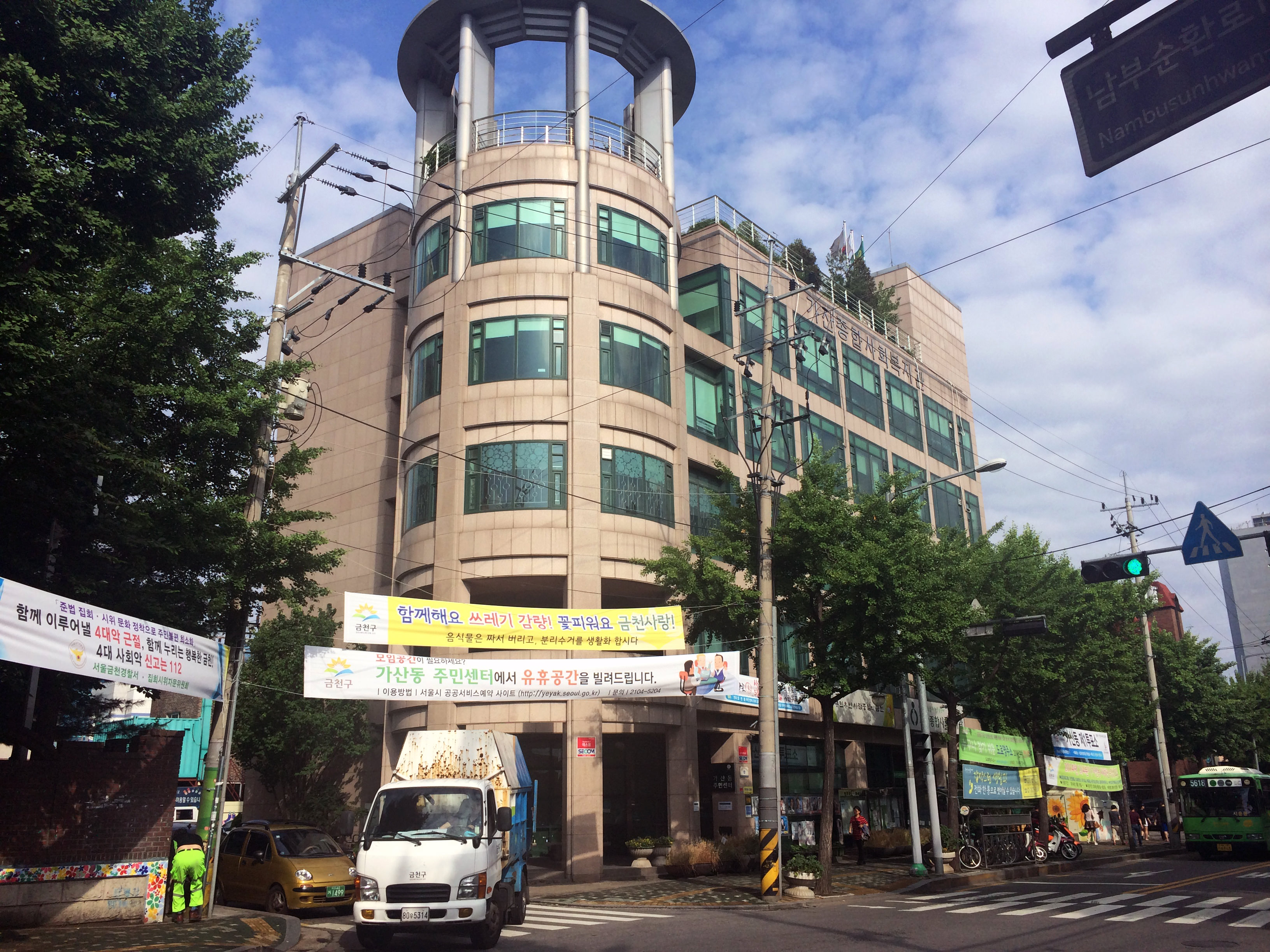
- Gasan-dong Community Service Center
- Interactive map of Gasan-dong
- Country: South Korea

Area
  - Total: 2.52 km^{2} (0.97 sq mi)

Population (2001)
  - Total: 21,879
  - Density: 8,682/km^{2} (22,490/sq mi)

Korean name
- Hangul: 가산동
- Hanja: 加山洞
- RR: Gasan-dong
- MR: Kasan-dong

Gasan-dong (Korean: 가산동) is a dong (neighborhood) of Geumcheon District, Seoul, South Korea. It is located in the south-western corner of Seoul, and borders Anyang River. Gasan-dong is home to Gasan Digital Complex metro station (line 1 and 7).

== Overview ==
Gasan-dong is a neighborhood located in Geumcheon District. Originally, it was part of Garibong-dong. On March 1, 1995, when Geumcheon District was established as a separate administrative district from Guro District, the area was divided between the two districts. The portion that remained under Guro District retained the name Garibong-dong, while the part that became part of Geumcheon District was renamed Gasan-dong.

The name "Gasan-dong" was created by combining characters from two former villages: "Ga" (가, 嘉) from Garibong-ri and "San" (산, 山) from Doksan-ri. These areas, originally part of Siheung County (Dong-myeon), were incorporated into Yeongdeungpo District of Seoul on January 1, 1963. Initially placed under the jurisdiction of the Gwanak Branch Office, the merged administrative unit was given the name "Gasan-dong."

However, under a jurisdictional reorganization on May 18, 1970, the name "Gasan-dong" was changed to "Garibong-dong," with Garibong-dong and Doksan-dong designated as legal dong (neighborhood units). Further administrative adjustments on October 1, 1975, officially separated Garibong-dong and Doksan-dong into distinct legal and administrative units. When Geumcheon District was established in 1995, the area formerly known as Gasan-dong (from 1963 to 1970) was reinstated under that name, reflecting its historical roots.

== See also ==
- Administrative divisions of South Korea
