= Seoksu station =

Train station in Anyang, South Korea

Coordinates: 37°26′04″N 126°54′09″E

| 석수; Seoksu |
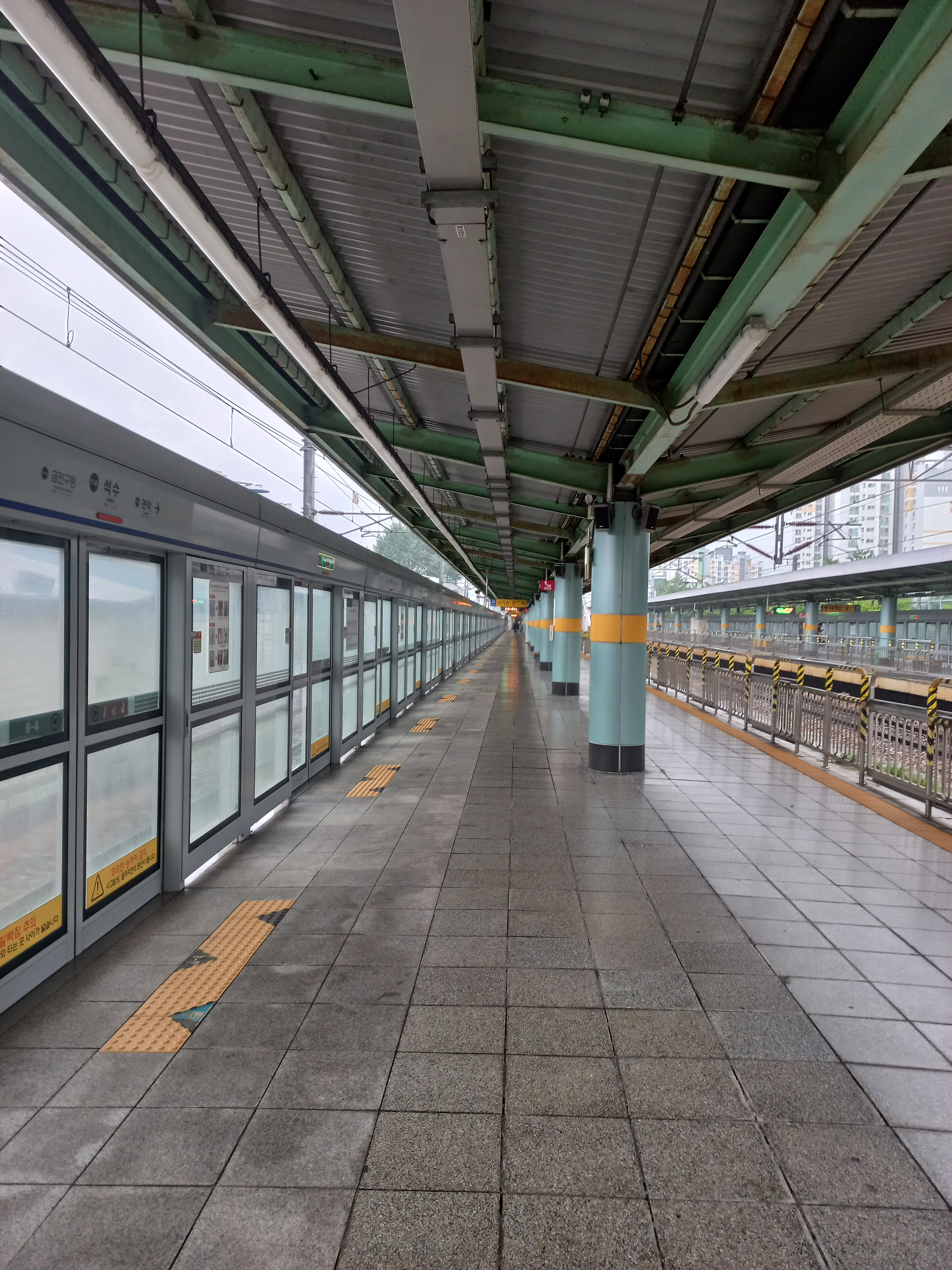

Korean name
- Hangul: 석수역
- Hanja: 石水驛
- RR: Seoksu-yeok
- MR: Sŏksu-yŏk

General information
- Location: 737 Seoksu 1-dong, 1431 Gyeongsudaero, Manan-gu, Anyang-si, Gyeonggi-do
- Operator: Korail
- Line: Line 1
- Platforms: 2
- Tracks: 4

Construction
- Structure type: Aboveground

Key dates
- August 2, 1982: Line 1 opened

Passengers
- (Daily) Based on Jan-Dec 2012. Line 1: 22,046
Location

Seoksu Station is a station on Seoul Subway Line 1. It is situated on the border of Seoul and Anyang, the station building itself lying in Anyang, hence the address and indeed its name, which is derived from the area of Anyang in which it is located, and the platforms being in Seoul.

== Vicinity ==
- Exit 1: Siheung Distribution Market
- Exit 2: Younhyun Elementary School, Younhyun Middle School, Younhyun Village

| Preceding station | Seoul Metropolitan Subway | Following station |
|---|---|---|
| Geumcheon-gu Office towards Kwangwoon University | Line 1 | Gwanak towards Seodongtan or Sinchang |
