= Yeongdeungpo Station =

Station of the Seoul Metropolitan Subway

Coordinates: 37°30′56″N 126°54′28″E

영등포
Yeongdeungpo
영등포; Yeongdeungpo
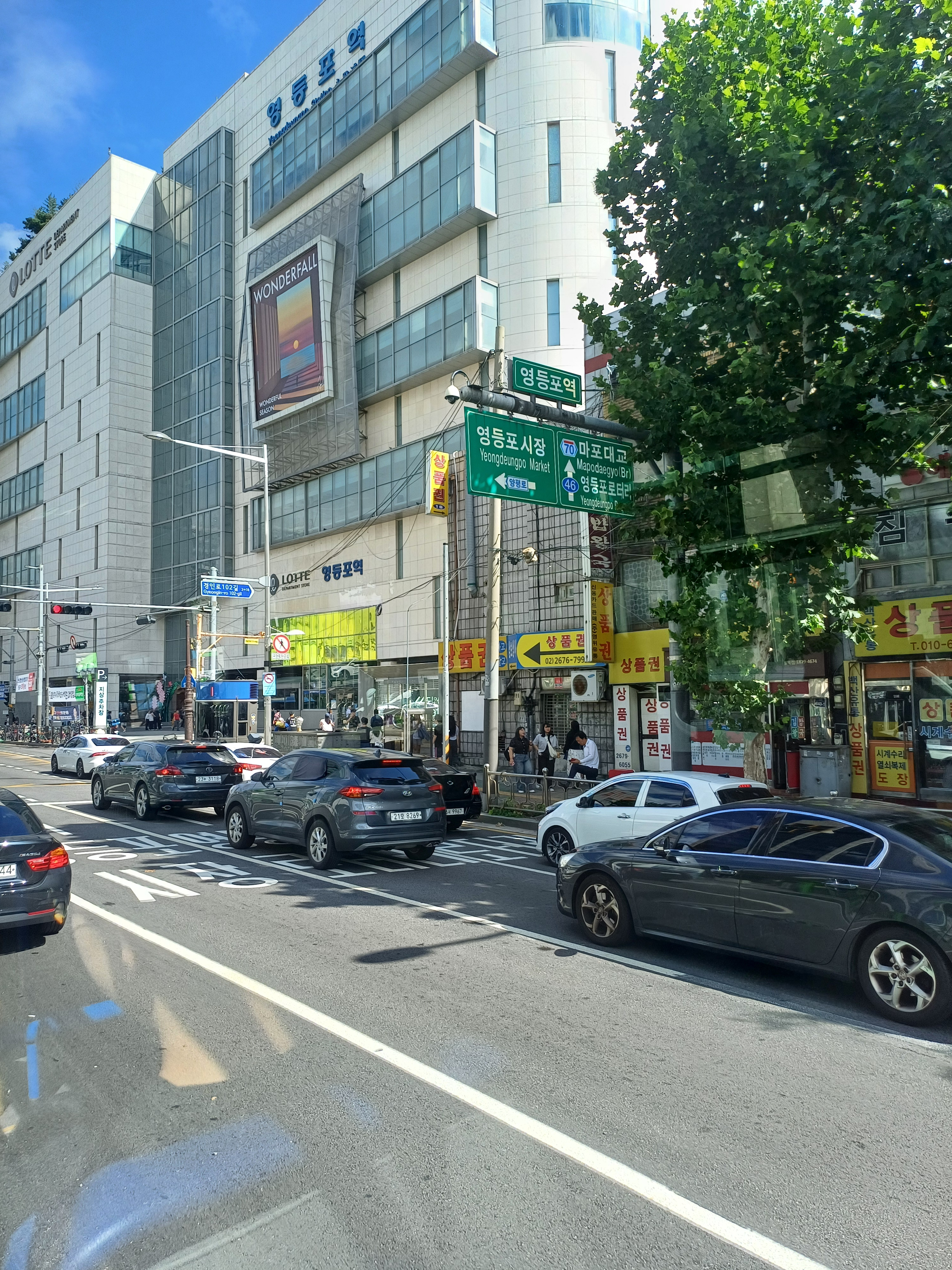

Korean name
- Hangul: 영등포역
- Hanja: 永登浦驛
- RR: Yeongdeungpo-yeok
- MR: Yŏngdŭngp'o-yŏk

General information
- Location: 618-496 Yeongdeungpo-dong, 846 Gyeonginno, Yeongdeungpo-gu, Seoul
- Operator: Korail
- Line: Gyeongbu Line
- Platforms: 5
- Tracks: 9

Construction
- Structure type: Aboveground

History
- Opened: September 18, 1899; August 15, 1974

Passengers
- (Daily) Based on Jan-Dec of 2012. KR: 28,229; Line 1: 113,606
Services
Preceding station	Seoul Metropolitan Subway	Following station
Singil towards Kwangwoon University or Yeoncheon	Line 1	Sindorim towards Incheon, Seodongtan or Sinchang
Singil towards Dongducheon	Line 1 Gyeongwon Express	Sindorim towards Incheon
Singil towards Cheongnyangni	Line 1 Gyeongbu Express	Sindorim towards Sinchang
Seoul Terminus	Line 1 Gyeongbu Express	Geumcheon-gu Office One-way operation
Terminus	Line 1 Gwangmyeong Shuttle Service	Sindorim towards Gwangmyeong
Preceding station	Korea Train Express	Following station
Seoul Terminus	Gyeongbu KTX	Suwon towards Busan
Yongsan towards Haengsin	Honam KTX	Gwangmyeong towards Mokpo
Yongsan towards Haengsin	Jeolla KTX	Gwangmyeong towards Yeosu-Expo
Preceding station	Korail	Following station
Seoul Terminus	ITX-Saemaeul Gyeongbu Line	Anyang towards Busan
Seoul Terminus	ITX-Saemaeul Gyeongjeon Line	Suwon towards Jinju
Yongsan Terminus	ITX-Saemaeul Honam Line	Suwon towards Mokpo
Yongsan Terminus	ITX-Saemaeul Gwangju Line	Suwon towards Gwangju
Yongsan Terminus	ITX-Saemaeul Jeolla Line	Suwon towards Yeosu-Expo
Seoul Terminus	ITX-Maum Gyeongbu Line	Suwon towards Busan
Yongsan Terminus	ITX-Maum Honam Line	Suwon towards Mokpo
Yongsan Terminus	ITX-Maum Jeolla Line	Suwon towards Yeosu-Expo
Yongsan Terminus	ITX-Maum Janghang Line	Anyang towards Hongseong
Yongsan Terminus	Saemaeul-ho Janghang Line	Suwon towards Iksan
Seoul Terminus	Mugunghwa-ho Gyeongbu Line	Anyang towards Busan
Yongsan Terminus	Mugunghwa-ho Honam Line	Anyang towards Gwangju or Mokpo
Seoul Terminus	Mugunghwa-ho Chungbuk Line	Suwon towards Jecheon or Yeongju
Yongsan Terminus	Mugunghwa-ho Janghang Line	Anyang towards Iksan
Yongsan Terminus	Mugunghwa-ho Jeolla Line	Anyang towards Yeosu-Expo
Seoul Terminus	S-Train West	Suwon towards Yeosu-Expo
Yongsan Terminus	G-Train	Suwon towards Iksan
Yongsan towards Seoul	Chungbuk Yeongdong Gugak Wine Train	Anyang towards Yeongdong
Location

Yeongdeungpo station is a ground-level railway station in Seoul, South Korea. The station is located in Yeongdeungpo Dong, Yeongdeungpo-gu, and is a stop on the Gyeongbu Line, Honam Line and Seoul Subway Line 1. The station is integrated into the Yeongdeungpo Lotte Department Store. Located in the station are Lotteria, Dunkin' Donuts, Krispy Kreme, and KFC.

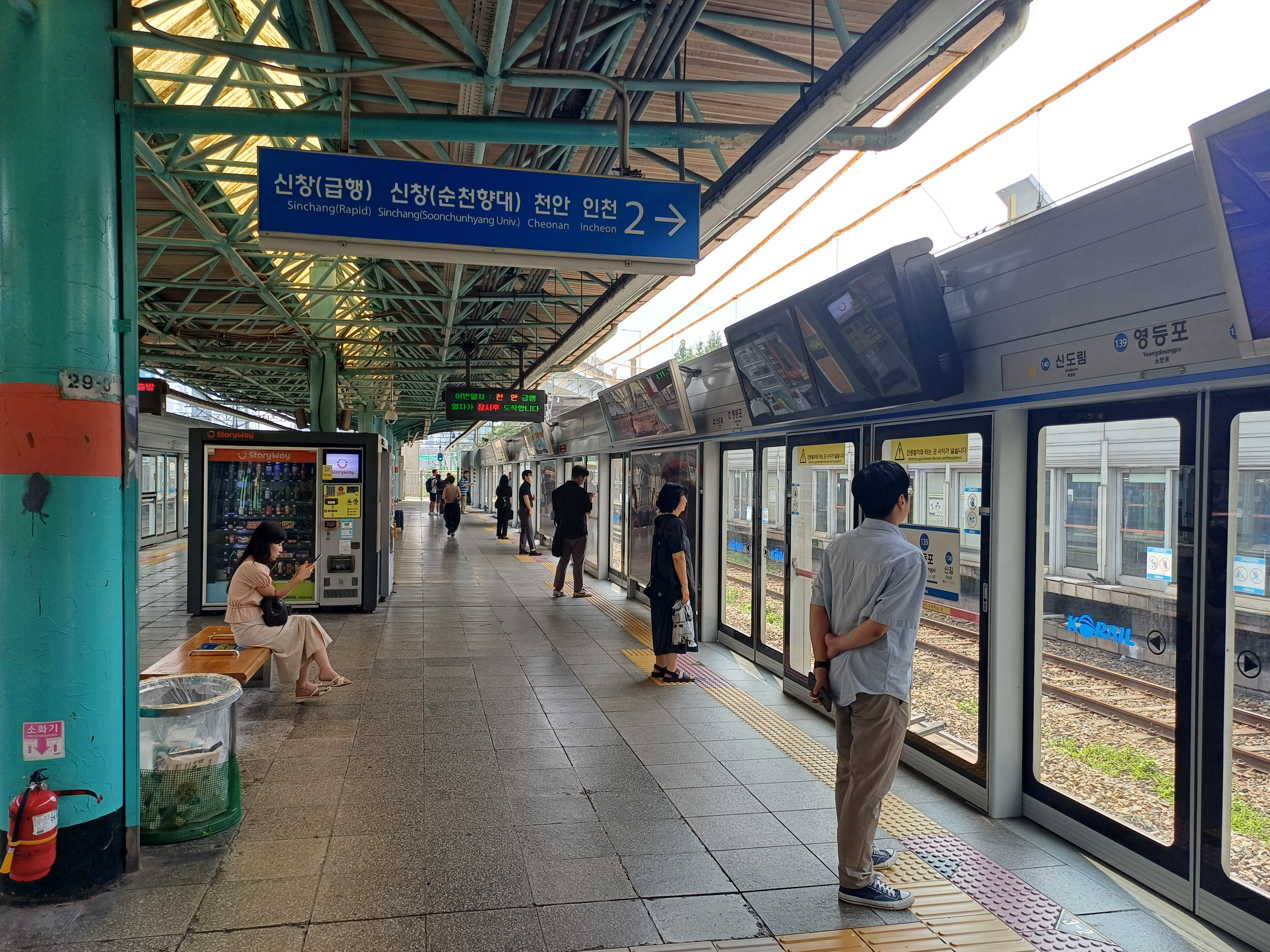
Line 1 platforms

== History ==
Yeongdeungpo station opened on September 18, 1899, as a stop on the Gyeongin Line. On April 1, 1936, trains on the Gyeongbu Line began calling here. The station's name was changed to "Namgyeongseong" (South Gyeongseong, Gyeongseong being the then name of Seoul), but it reverted to its current name on April 1, 1943, and on January 1, 1949, the station was given "Level 5" in its classification of importance. The station building was destroyed on June 30, 1950, five days after the beginning of the Korean War, and a new building was not completed until January 12, 1965. On February 1, 1968, the station was deemed to be of "Level 4" importance. Trains on the Seoul Subway began running through Yeongdeungpo on August 15, 1974. The station stopped handling freight on May 1, 2006.

On November 6, 2022, a Mugunghwa-ho train derailed at the station, injuring 30 passengers.

On September 18, 1899, when the Gyeongin Line opened, Noryangjin station was located at the site of Yeongdeungpo station, but it was not possible to build a station near the Han River due to flooding. On July 8, 1900, when the Gyeongin Line was fully opened, Noryangjin station was moved to its current location. The existing station facilities in Yeongdeungpo were kept for operation, but when the residents of Yeongdeungpo demanded that trains stop there, the Gyeongin Railroad Joint Stock Company converted the facilities to Yeongdeungpo station operations.

== Services ==
The first train on weekdays (not including national holidays) is at 5.04 a.m. for northbound and 5.05 a.m. for southbound, while the last is at 00.04 a.m. for northbound and 00.24 a.m. for southbound. Travel time to Suwon takes 45 minutes, while travel time to Incheon takes 53 minutes.

All express trains, except for the Seoul - Cheonan Express, stop here, and the Gwangmyeong Shuttle stops here. In addition, trains to Incheon depart twice a day. In addition, it has become a gathering point for almost all Mugunghwa, Saemaeul, and KTX service systems.

== Vicinity ==
The following places may be accessed from the exits as listed below.

- Exit 1 : Lotte Department Store, Yeongdeungpo market, Shinsegae department store
- Exit 2 : Singil Dong; "rear exit"
- Exit 3 : Yeongdeungpo tax office, Yeongdeungpo Post Office, Lotte Department Store
- Exit 4 : Yeongdeungpo fire station
