= Seoul Light Rapid Transit =

Planned LRT in Seoul City

Seoul City in South Korea plans to build up to ten new light metro lines, or light rapid transit (LRT). They would be connected to the Seoul Metropolitan Subway giving access to several hundred subway stations. As opposed to traditional subway lines, LRT lines have a lower capacity.

== Uijeongbu Light Rail ==
This line, opened on 1 July 2012, is 11.2 km (7.0 mi) long and has 15 stations. It runs between Balgok and Tapseok, and connects to Line 1 at Hoeryong.

== Ui Line ==
In September 2017, Seoul City opened a 11.4 km (7.1 mi) light subway line (Ui LRT) from Ui-dong to Sinseol-dong in northeastern Seoul. The line carries roughly 75,000 passengers a day and has 13 stations. It connects to Line 4 at Sungshin Women's University, Line 6 at Bomun and Line 1 & 2 at Sinseol Dong.

== Sillim Line ==
Sillim LRT (신림선 경전철) is an 11-station 7.8 km line from Saetgang Station to Gwanaksan Station. Customers can transfer to Seoul Subway Lines 1, 2, 7, and 9. Construction began in 2017 and it opened on 28 May 2022.

== Dongbuk Line ==
Dongbuk LRT is an under-construction 16-station 13.4 km-long line. The line starts from Wangsimni station and heads northeast to Sanggye station. Construction started in October 2019 and completion is scheduled for November 2027.

== Under planning ==
- Gangbukhoengdan Line
- Myeonmok Line
- Mok-dong Line
- Wirye–Sinsa Line
