= Seoul Metropolitan Subway =

Railway system in South Korea

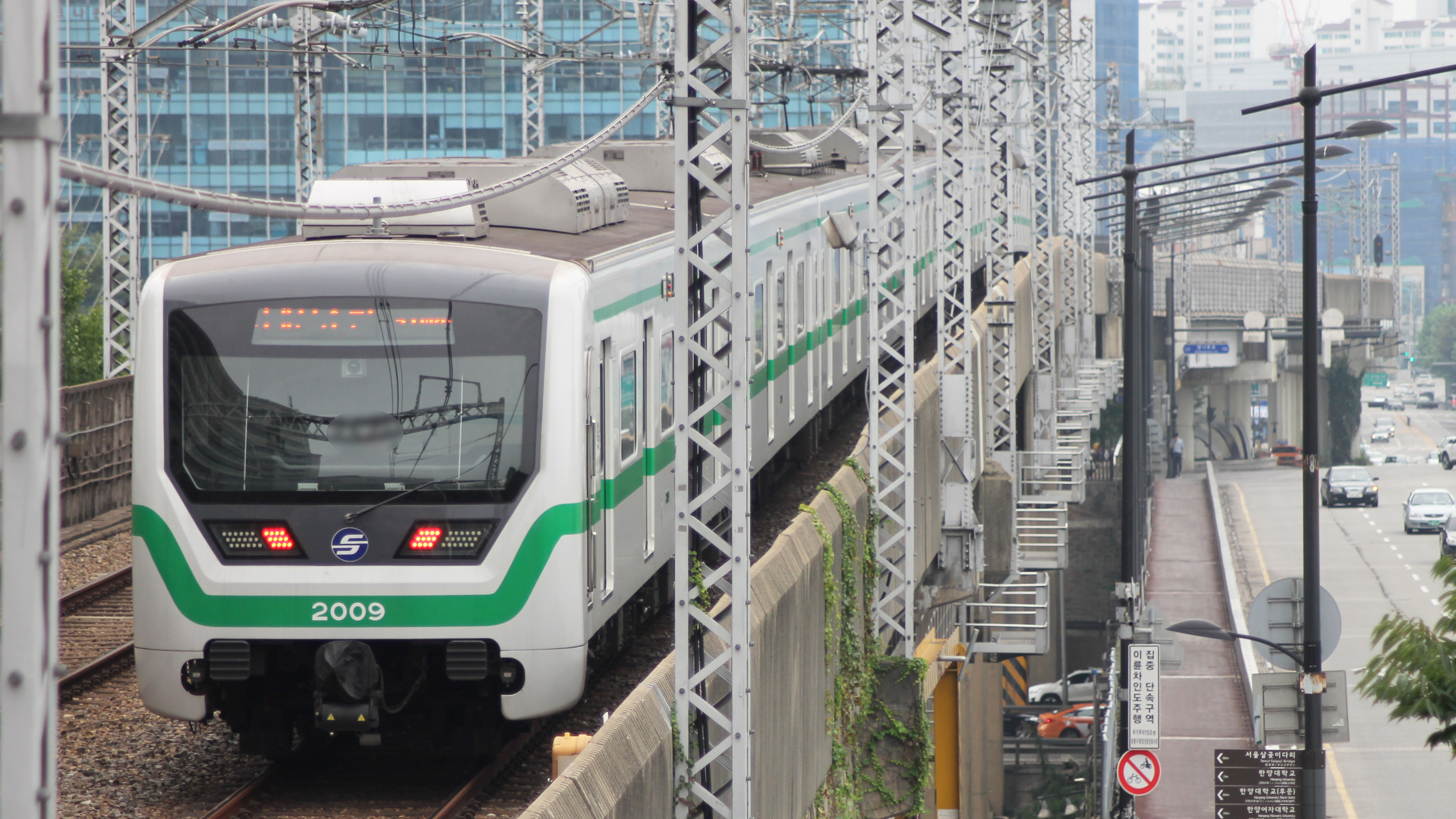
- Seoul Metro 2000 series train on Line 2

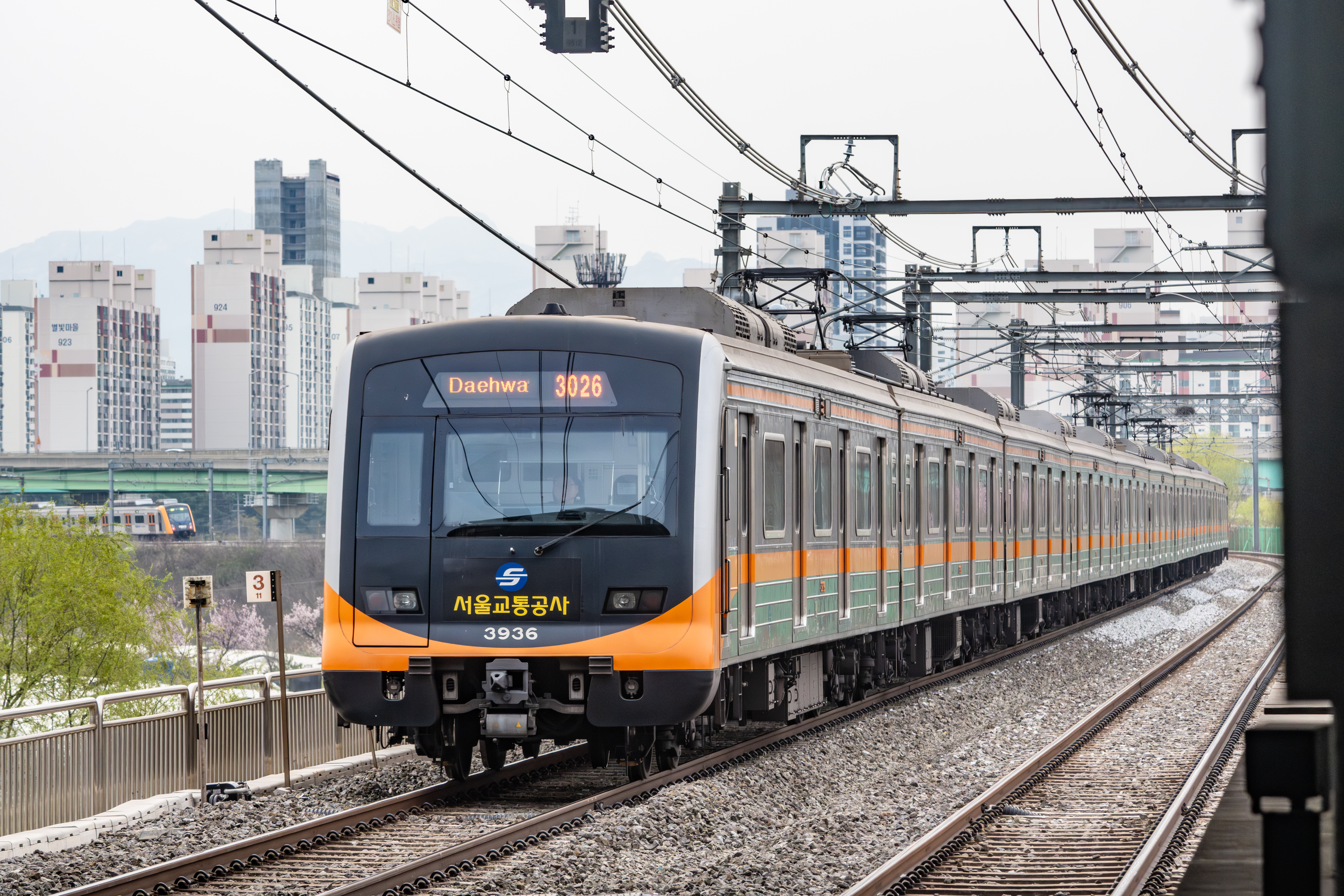
- Seoul Metro Class 3000 set 3936 on Line 3 at Daegok

Overview
- Native name: 수도권 전철
- Owner: Government of South Korea, Seoul Metropolitan Government, Incheon Metropolitan City, Bucheon City, Uijeongbu City, Yongin City
- Locale: Seoul Metropolitan Area
- Transit type: Rapid transit, Commuter rail
- Number of lines: 24
- Number of stations: 656
- Annual ridership: 2.42 billion (2024, Lines 1-8, Seoul Subway); 1.16 billion (2017, Korail)

Operation
- Began operation: 15 August 1974; 52 years ago
- Operators: Seoul Metro, Korail, Incheon Transit Corporation, and private rapid transit operators

Technical
- System length: 1,302.2 km (809.1 mi) (all lines)
- Track gauge: 1,435 mm (4 ft 8 1/2 in) standard gauge ^{(all lines excluding Rubber-tyred metro lines)} 1620 mm^{(U Line)}, 1700 mm ^{(Sillim Line)}
- Electrification: 25,000 V 60Hz AC Overhead line (Korail Lines (minus Line 3),AREX, Shinbundang Line, GTX) 1,500 V DC Overhead line (Seoul Metro Lines, Incheon Subway Line 1) 750 V DC Third rail (Light metro Lines, Incheon Subway Line 2)
System map

- Seoul Metropolitan Subway
- Hangul: 수도권 전철
- Hanja: 首都圈 電鐵
- RR: Sudogwon jeoncheol
- MR: Sudokwŏn chŏnch'ŏl

The Seoul Metropolitan Subway (Korean: 수도권 전철) is a metropolitan railway system consisting of 24 rapid transit, light metro, commuter rail and people mover lines located in northwest South Korea. The system serves most of the Seoul Metropolitan Area including the Incheon metropolis and satellite cities in Gyeonggi province. Some regional lines in the network stretch out beyond the Seoul Metropolitan Area to rural areas in northern Chungnam province and western Gangwon Province, that lie over 100 km (62 mi) away from the capital.

The network consists of multiple systems that form a larger, coherent system. These being the Seoul Metro proper, consisting of Seoul Metro lines 1 through 9 and certain light rail lines, that serves Seoul city proper and its surroundings; Korail regional rail lines, which serve the greater metropolitan region and beyond; Incheon Metro lines, operated by Incheon Transit Corporation, that serve Incheon city proper; and miscellaneous light rail lines, such as Gimpo Goldline and Yongin Everline, that connect lower-density areas of their respective cities to the rest of the network. Most of the system is operated by three companies – Seoul Metro, Korail (Korea Railroad Corporation), and Incheon Metro – with the rest being operated by an assortment of local municipal corporations and private rail companies.

The first line of the system, Line 1, started construction in 1971 and began operations in 1974, with through-operation to Korail's suburban railways. As of 2022, the network has 331.5 km (206.0 mi) of track on lines 1–9 alone.

The majority of the rolling stock used in the system was built by Hyundai Rotem, South Korea's leading train manufacturer.

== Overview ==
The first line of the Seoul Subway network started construction in 1971. The first section of subway was built using the cheaper cut and cover construction method. Initial lines relied heavily on Japanese technology, and subsequent lines (until the early-2000s) procured technological imports from Japan and the United Kingdom (in particular, GEC Traction equipment used on wide-width Lines 2, 3 and 4 rolling stock from the 1980s). For example, Line 1 opened in 1974 with through services joining surrounding Korail suburban railway lines influenced by the Tokyo subway. Today, many of the Seoul Metropolitan Subway's lines are operated by Korail, South Korea's national rail operator.

The subway has free WiFi accessible in all stations and trains. All stations have platform screen doors. These safety doors were completed by 2017, however many stations previously had metal barriers installed decades beforehand. The world's first virtual mart for smartphone users opened at Seolleung station in 2011.

All directional signs in the system are written in Korean using Hangul, as well as English and Katakana/Chinese characters for Japanese and Mandarin Chinese. However the maps on the walls are in Korean and English only. In the trains, there are in addition many LCD screens giving service announcements, upcoming stop names, YTN news, stock prices and animated shorts. There are also prerecorded voice announcements that give the upcoming station, any possible line transfer, and the exiting side in Korean, followed by English. At major stations, this is followed by Japanese, then Mandarin Chinese, as well.

Seoul Subway uses full-color LCD screens at all stations to display real-time subway arrival times, which are also available on apps for smartphones. Most trains have digital TV screens, and all of them have air conditioning and climate controlled seats installed that are automatically heated in the winter. In 2014, it became the world's first metro operator to use transparent displays for ads when it installed 48 transparent displays on major stations of Line 2 in Gangnam District. All lines use the T-money smart payment system using RFID and NFC technology for automatic payment by T-money smart cards, smartphones, or credit cards and one can transfer to any of the other lines within the system for free. (Note: With the exception of AREX on Yeongjong Island (extra charge applied depending on distance) and Shinbundang Line (extra charge of 500~1900 KRW depending on the sections used). EverLine and U Line will allow free transfers from 2014.)

Trains on numbered lines and light rail lines generally run on the right-hand track, while trains on the named heavy-rail lines (e.g. Shinbundang Line, Suin–Bundang Line, and AREX) run on the left-hand track. The exceptions are the trains on Line 1, as well as those on Line 4 south of Namtaeryeong station. These lines run on the left-hand track because these rail lines are government-owned via Korail or through-run to government-owned lines and follow a different standard to the metro, one that is followed by all national rail lines (with the exception of the otherwise self-contained Ilsan Line) because much of the Korean Peninsula's early rail network was constructed during Japanese rule.

== History ==
Line 1, from Seongbuk station to Incheon station and Suwon station, opened on 15 August 1974. On 9 December 1978, the Yongsan-Cheongnyangni line via Wangsimni (now part of the Jungang Line) was added to Line 1. Line 2 opened on 10 October 1980. Line 4 opened on 20 April 1985, and Line 3 on 12 July. On 1 April 1994, the Indeogwon-Namtaeryeong extension of Line 4 opened. The Bundang Line, from Suseo station to Ori station, opened on 1 September. On 15 November 1995, Line 5 opened. The Jichuk-Daehwa extension of Line 3 opened on 30 January 1996. On 20 March, the Kkachisan-Sindorim extension of Line 2 opened. Line 7 opened on 11 October, and Line 8 on 23 November. On 6 October 1999, Incheon Subway Line 1 opened.

Seoul Subway Line 6 opened on 7 August 2000. In 2004 the fare system reverted to charging by distance, and free bus transfers were introduced. The Byeongjeom-Cheonan extension of Line 1 opened on 20 January 2005. On 16 December, the Jungang Line from Yongsan station to Deokso station opened. The Uijeongbu-Soyosan extension of Line 1 opened and shuttle service from Yongsan station to Gwangmyeong station began (with the route now shortened from Yeongdeungpo to Gwangmyeong) on 15 December 2006. On 23 March 2007, AREX opened. The Deokso-Paldang extension of the Jungang Line opened on 27 December. On 15 December 2008, the Cheonan-Sinchang extension of Line 1 opened. The magnetic paper ticket changed to an RFID-based card on 1 May 2009. On 1 July the Gyeongui Line from Seoul Station to Munsan station opened, and on 24 July Line 9 from Gaehwa station to Sinnonhyeon station opened.

The Byeongjeom-Seodongtan extension of Line 1 opened on 26 February 2010, and the Gyeongchun Line opened on 21 December. On 28 October 2011, the Shinbundang Line from Gangnam station to Jeongja station opened. The Suin Line, from Oido station to Songdo station, opened on 30 June 2012. The U Line opened on 1 July, the Onsu-Bupyeong-gu Office extension of Line 7 on 27 October and the Gongdeok-Gajwa extension of the Gyeongui Line on 15 December, and on 26 April 2013, EverLine opened. On 27 December 2014, the Gyeongui Line was extended to Yongsan and started through running to the Jungang Line, forming the Gyeongui–Jungang Line. The Sinnonhyeon-Sports Complex extension of Line 9 opened on 28 March 2015. On 30 January 2016 the Jeongja-Gwanggyo extension of the Shinbundang Line opened, followed by the Songdo-Incheon extension of the Suin Line on 27 February. Incheon Subway Line 2 opened on 30 July, and the Gyeonggang Line on 24 September. The Gyeongui–Jungang Line is extended one station east to Jipyeong station on 21 January 2017, with 4 round trips to Jipyeong station. On 16 June 2018 the Seohae Line opened. Magongnaru station on Line 9 became an interchange station with AREX on 29 September 2018. Bundang line was extended northeastward to Cheongnyangni station, allowing for connections to the Gyeongchun Line and regional rail services on 31 December 2018. On 28 September 2019, the Gimpo Goldline opened. On 12 September 2020, the Suin Line extension between Hanyang Univ. at Ansan and Suwon, beginning the interlining with Line 4 between Oido and Hanyang Univ. at Ansan, as well as through-running with the Bundang Line to form the Suin–Bundang Line. On May 24, 2022, the Sillim Line opened, becoming the newest addition to the Seoul Metropolitan Subway.

== Lines and branches ==
The system is organized such that numbered lines, with some exceptions, are considered as urban rapid transit lines located within the Seoul Metropolitan Area, whereas wide-area commuter lines operated by Korail provide a metro-like commuter rail service that usually extends far beyond the boundaries of the metropolitan area, rather similar to the RER in Paris. The AREX is an airport rail link that links Incheon International Airport and Gimpo Airport to central Seoul, and offers both express service directly to Incheon International Airport and all-stop commuter service for people living along the vicinity of the line. While operating hours may vary depending on the line and station in question, the Seoul Metropolitan Subway generally operates every day from 5.30 a.m. until midnight, with some lines operated by Seoul Metro ending services around 1 a.m. on weekdays.

System map of the Seoul Metropolitan Subway, showing current lines

Line name	Terminus (Ascending / Descending)		Stations	Color	Total length	Opening Year	Last Extension	Operator	Owner
Line 1	Yeoncheon / Dongducheon / Kwangwoon Univ. / Cheongnyangni / Seoul Station / Yeongdeungpo	Dongincheon / Incheon / Sinchang / Gwangmyeong / Seodongtan	102 (Note: Of which 92 are operated by Korail and 10 by Seoul Metro.)	Dark blue	218.3 km (Note: Of which 210.5 km is operated by Korail and 7.8 km by Seoul Metro.)	1974	2023	Korail / Seoul Metro	Government of South Korea / Seoul Metropolitan Government
Line 2	Circular / Seongsu / Sindorim	Circular / Sinseol-dong / Kkachisan	51	Green	60.2 km	1980	1996	Seoul Metro	Seoul Metropolitan Government
Line 3	Daehwa	Ogeum	44 (Note: Of which 10 are operated by Korail and 34 by Seoul Metro.)	Orange	57.4 km (Note: Of which 19.2 km is operated by Korail and 38.2 km by Seoul Metro.)	1985	2010	Korail / Seoul Metro	Government of South Korea / Seoul Metropolitan Government
Line 4	Jinjeop / Buramsan	Oido	51 (Note: Of which 25 are operated by Korail, 23 by Seoul Metro and 3 by Namyangju City Urban Corporation.)	Blue	85.7 km (Note: Of which 40.4 km is operated by Korail, 31.1 km by Seoul Metro and 14.3 km by Namyangju City Urban Corporation.)	1985	2022	Korail / Seoul Metro / Namyangju City Urban Corporation	Government of South Korea / Seoul Metropolitan Government
Line 5	Banghwa	Hanam Geomdansan / Macheon	56	Violet	63.0 km	1995	2021	Seoul Metro	Seoul Metropolitan Government
Line 6	Eungam	Sinnae	39	Brown	36.4 km	2000	2019	Seoul Metro	Seoul Metropolitan Government
Line 7	Jangam	Seongnam	53 (Note: Of which 42 are operated by Seoul Metro, and 11 by Incheon Transit Corporation.)	Olive	60.1 km (Note: Of which 46.9 km is operated by Seoul Metro and 14.1 km by Incheon Transit Corporation.)	1996	2021	Seoul Metro / Incheon Transit Corporation	Seoul Metropolitan Government / Bucheon City Council / Incheon Metropolitan City Council
Line 8	Byeollae	Moran	24 (Note: Of which 19 are operated by Seoul Metro, 3 by Guri Urban Corporation and 2 by Namyangju City Urban Corporation.)	Pink	31.1 km (Note: Of which 18.8 km is operated by Seoul Metro, 6.5 km by Guri Urban Corporation and 3.0 km by Namyangju City Urban Corporation.)	1996	2024	Seoul Metro / Guri Urban Corporation / Namyangju City Urban Corporation	Seoul Metropolitan Government
Line 9	Gaehwa / Gimpo Int'l Airport (Note: While Gaehwa is the official terminus, express trains only run to Gimpo International Airport station)	VHS Medical Center	38 (Note: Of which 25 are operated by Seoul Metro Line 9 Corporation and 13 by Seoul Metro.)	Gold	40.6 km (Note: Of which 27.0 km is operated by Seoul Metro Line 9 Corporation and 13.6 km by Seoul Metro.)	2009	2018	Seoul Metro Line 9 Corporation / Seoul Metro	Seoul Metropolitan Government
AREX	Seoul Station	Incheon Int'l Airport Terminal 2	14	Sea blue	63.8 km	2007	2018	Airport Railroad Co., Ltd.	Government of South Korea
Gyeongui–Jungang Line	Imjingang / Munsan	Munsan / Seoul Station / Yongmun / Jipyeong	57	Jade	132.5 km	2005	2021	Korail	Government of South Korea
Gyeongchun Line	Cheongnyangni / Kwangwoon Univ. (Note: Most trains run until Sangbong, very few trains operate to Kwangwoon Univ. and a few trains run to Cheongnyangni (However, express trains always go to Cheongnyangni))	Chuncheon	24	Teal	81.3 km	2010	2016	Korail	Government of South Korea
Suin–Bundang Line	Cheongnyangni / Wangsimni / Oido (Note: Most trains run until Wangsimni and a few trains run to Cheongnyangni)	Gosaek / Incheon	63	Yellow	104.6 km	1994	2020	Korail	Government of South Korea
Ui LRT	Sinseol-dong	Bukhansan Ui	13	Lime	11.4 km	2017	—	UiTrans LRT Co., Ltd.	Seoul Metropolitan Government
Sillim Line	Saetgang	Gwanaksan	11	Sky blue	7.8 km	2022	—	South Seoul LRT Co., Ltd.	Seoul Metropolitan Government
Shinbundang Line	Sinsa	Gwanggyo	16	Red	33.4 km	2011	2022	Shinbundang Railroad Corporation / Gyeonggi Railroad Co., Ltd. / New Seoul Railroad Co., Ltd. / Neo Trans	Government of South Korea
Incheon Line 1	Geomdan Lake Park	Songdo Moonlight Festival Park	33	Light blue	37.1 km	1999	2025	Incheon Transit Corporation	Incheon Metropolitan City Council
Incheon Line 2	Geomdan Oryu	Unyeon	27	Orange	29.1 km	2016	—	Incheon Transit Corporation	Incheon Metropolitan City Council
EverLine	Giheung	Jeondae·Everland	15	Green	18.1 km	2013	—	Yongin EverLine Co., Ltd. / Neo Trans	Yongin City Council
U Line	Balgok	Depot Temporary Platform	16	Amber	11.3 km	2012	~	Uijeongbu Light Rail Transit Co., Ltd	Uijeongbu City Council
Gyeonggang Line	Pangyo	Yeoju	12	Dark blue	54.8 km	2016	—	Korail	Government of South Korea
Seohae Line	Ilsan	Wonsi	21	Lime	47 km	2018	2023	Korail / SEO HAE RAIL CO., LTD. (Subsidiary of Seoul Metro) / ERAIL Co., Ltd.	Government of South Korea
Gimpo Goldline	Gimpo International Airport	Yangchon	10	Gold	23.7 km	2019	—	GIMPO Goldline Co., Ltd. (Subsidiary of Seoul Metro)	Gimpo City Council
GTX-A	Suseo	Dongtan	4	Lilac	32.8 km	2024	—	GTX-A Operation (Subsidiary of Seoul Metro) / SG Rail Co., Ltd.	Government of South Korea
GTX-A	Unjeongjungang	Seoul Station	5	Lilac	33.0 km	2024	2024	GTX-A Operation (Subsidiary of Seoul Metro) / SG Rail Co., Ltd.	Government of South Korea

== Fares and ticketing ==
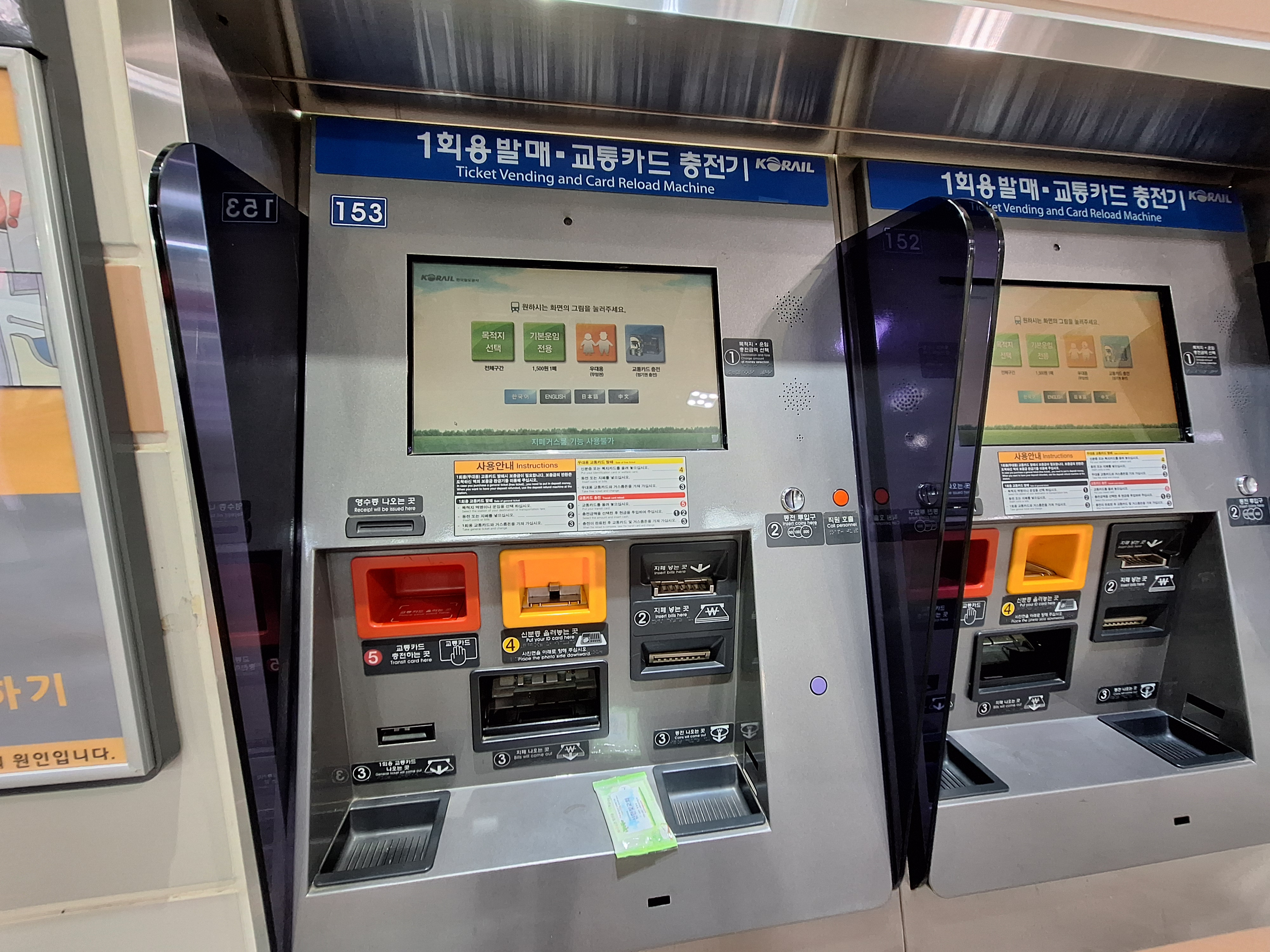
Ticket Vending and Card Reload Machine in Soraepogu Station, Incheon

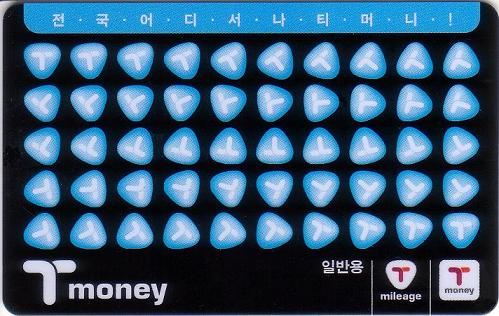
T-money smart card

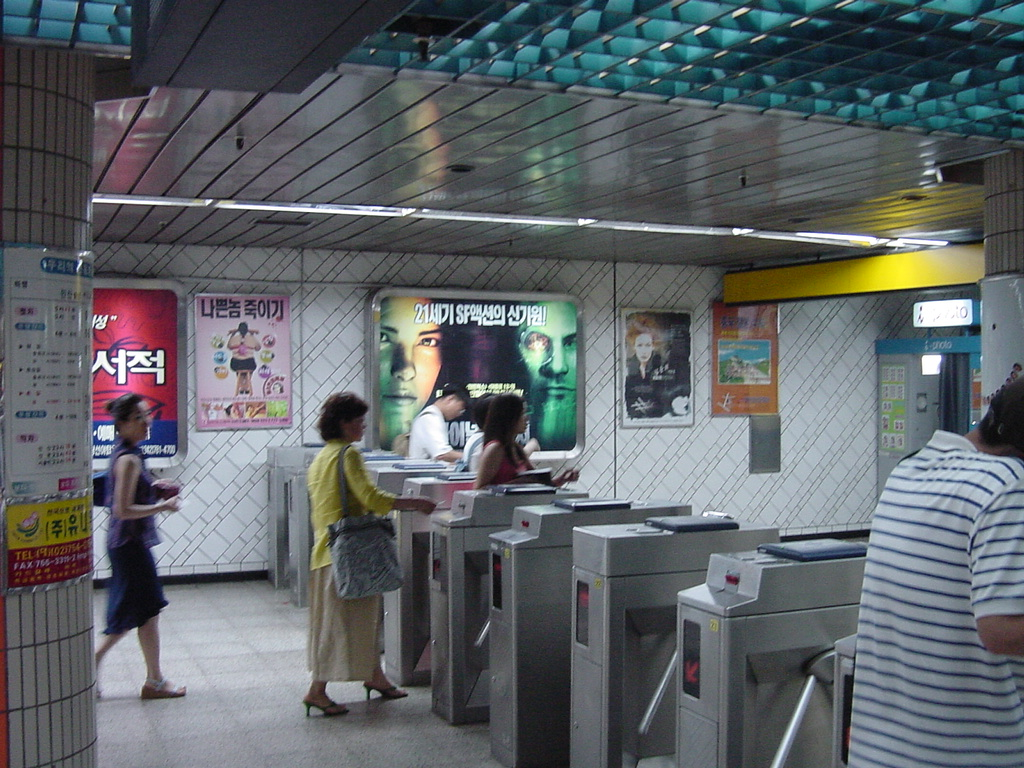
Magnetic-stripe ticket + Upass turnstiles on Line 4 in July 2001

The Seoul Metropolitan Subway system operates on a unified transportation fare system, meaning that subways and buses in Seoul, Incheon and Gyeonggi Province are treated as one system when it comes to fares. For example, a subway rider can transfer to any other line for free (with the exception of Shinbundang Line, EverLine and U Line, the latter two adding a flat charge of 200 and 300 won respectively). One can also transfer to any Seoul, Incheon, Gyeonggi-do, or some South Chungcheong Province city buses for free and get discounted fares on the more expensive express buses.

In the case of Shinbundang Line, charges vary depending on the section used. The Sinsa-Gangnam section always charges 500 won, while the Gangnam-Jeongja section or the Jeongja-Gwanggyo section charges 1,000 won when used alone, and 1,400 altogether when used in conjunction with another. In total, the maximum added fee one can be charged is 1,900 won, which can be achieved by using all three sections.

From 1974 until 1985, the subway's fare system was distance-based and Edmondson railway tickets, originally introduced for the Korean railways during Japanese rule, were used for fare validation. In 1985, the fare system changed to a zone-based system and magnetic-stripe paper tickets were introduced to replace the Edmondson system.

In 1996, the Seoul Metropolitan Subway became the first subway system in the world to roll out contactless smart cards, called Upass, for fare validation. These cards were issued up till October 2014, when they were discontinued in favour of the newer T-money cards.

Currently, the fare system is distance-based and accepted payment methods are single-use tickets, transportation cards including T-money and EZL (formerly Cash Bee). Transportation cards can also be used on buses, taxis, convenience stores and many other popular retail places. Riders must tap in with a smartphone (KakaoPay and Samsung Pay/Wallet only), contactless-equipped credit or debit cards or other prepaid metro card at the entry gates. Popular methods of payments are using NFC-enabled Android smartphones (topped up or billed to the owner's credit/debit card via the T-money app) or credit or check (debit) cards with built-in RFID technology issued by the bank or card company.

The current single-use ticket is a credit card-sized plastic card with RFID technology, which can be obtained from automated machines in every subway station. A 500 won deposit fee is included in the price, and is refunded when the ticket is returned at any station. Multiple use cards are sold in convenience stores and the functionality is included in many credit/debit cards.

As of June 2025, fares (except for single-use tickets) are 1,550 won for a trip up to 10 km (6.2 mi), with 100 won added for each subsequent 5 km (3.1 mi). Once 50 km (31.1 mi) has been passed, 100 won will be added every 8 km (5.0 mi). Single-use ticket users must pay RFID deposit 500 won plus 100 won surcharge to fare.

Half-priced children's tickets are available. The city government also uses Seoul Citypass as a transportation card. Senior citizens and disabled people qualify for free transit and can get a free ticket with a valid ID card or enter with a registered transportation card without having the fare deducted.

International travelers can also use a Metropolitan Pass (MPASS) which provides up to 20 trips per day during the prepaid duration of 1 day to 7 days. Depending on where you purchase the card, the service is limited to the Seoul metropolitan area or Jeju Island and does not work in taxis or certain convenience stores.

In October 2025, the Seoul Metropolitan Government announced that an EMV based open-loop fare collection system will be introduced between 2025 and 2030 in coordination with 19 transit agencies, card companies, and ministries.

== Accidents and incidents ==
On 2 May 2014, two subway trains collided along Seoul Subway Line 2 at Sangwangsimni station, injuring 170 people.

On 23 March 2025, a Line 2 train derailed after colliding with a buffer while departing from a depot at Sindorim Station. No injuries were reported.

== Current construction ==
=== Opening 2026 ===
- The Seohae Line is set to extend South from Wonsi station to Seohwaseongnamyang Station by March 2026.
- The Dongbuk Line, a light metro line in northeastern Seoul, is scheduled to open in July 2026 with 14 stations between Wangsimni station and Eunhaeng Sageori station.
- The Wirye Line, another light metro line in southeastern Seoul, will open in September 2026 between Macheon station on Line 5 and will have two branches: one will head to Bokjeong station on Line 8 and Suin-Bundang line, and one at Namwirye station, also a station on Line 8, with 12 stations planned in total. While technically part of the subway system, the Wirye Line will actually be a tramway line.
- The Sinansan Line will open in December 2026. The line will start at Yeouido station and split into two branches: one to Hanyang University ERICA Campus station, and one to Songsan station on the Seohae Line. The latter branch will partially share tracks with the Seohae Line and the Gyeonggang Line.
- Hagik station, between Songdo station and Inha University station on the Suin–Bundang Line, will open as an in-fill station once the redevelopment of the surrouneding area is completed. This area will feature cultural, commercial, and medical facilities along with new residential areas.
- GTX A will open its central section between Seoul station and Suseo station (15.3 km) by September 2026, completing the entire GTX A Line. However, Samseong Station will still be under construction at the time of the opening, and there will be no intermediary stop between Seoul station and Suseo station.
- Line 7 will be extended by 2 stations northwards to Goeup station in Yangju by 2026, with a transfer at Tapseok station with the U Line.
- Gwacheon Information Town station, between Indeogwon station and Government Complex Gwacheon station on Line 4, will open as an in-fill station in December 2026 once the redevelopment of the surrounding area is completed.

=== Opening 2027 ===
- Changneung station, between Daegok station and Yeonsinnae station will open as an in-fill station on the GTX A Line, to go along with urban development in the area.
- Hoecheonjungang station, between Deokgye station and Deokjeong station will open as an in-fill station on the Line 1 Line, to go along with urban development in the area.
- Buseong station, between Jiksan station and Dujeong station will open as an in-fill station on the Line 1 Line, to go along with urban development in the area.
- Line 7 will be extended from Seongnam station to Cheongna Int'l Business Complex station in 2027. The new extension will have 6 stations and a total length of 6.8 km.

=== Opening 2028 ===
- Line 9 will be extended 4 stations eastwards from VHS Medical Center station to Saemteo Park station, with a transfer with Godeok station on Line 5 by 2028.
- Samseong station will open as an in-fill station on GTX-A, between Seoul station and Suseo station in April 2028. The opening of the GTX-A part of the station was delayed due to the construction delay of the Yeongdongdaero Transfer Complex, a complex that will connect Samseong station of Line 2, Samseong station of GTX-A, GTX-C, and Wirye-Sinsa Line, and Bongeunsa Station on Line 9.
- GTX-C will open between Deokjeong station in the North and Suwon Station and Sangnoksu Station to the South, splitting into 2 branches. The line will feature new dedicated tracks on its central section and share tracks with Line 1 at its ends. In total, the length of the line witll be 85.9 km, with 14 stations.

=== Opening 2029 or later ===
- Line 7 will be extended from Cheongna Int'l Business Complex station to Cheongna International City station in 2029, connecting with the AREX Line. The new extension will have 2 stations and a total length of 3.1 km.
- Line 7 will be extended from Goeup Station to Pocheon station in 2030. The new extension will have 4 stations and a total length of 19.3 km.
- The Dongtan-Indeogwon Line will open between Dongtan Station and Indeogwon Station by 2029. The Line will have 17 stops and a length of 38.1 km.
- The Gyeonggang Line will be extended to the west, from Pangyo station to Wolgot station by December 2029. The extension will be 49.6 km long, and partly share tracks with the Sinansan Line. There will be 11 additional stations to the line, including transfers available at Wolgot station (Suin-Bundang Line), Siheung City Hall station (Seohae Line, Sinansan Line), Gwangmyeong Station (Line 1, Sinansan Line), Anyang station (Line 1), Indeogwon station (Line 4, Indeogwon-Dongtan Line). Service may then be further extended further west towards downtown Incheon using the tracks of the Suin-Bundang Line.
- The Shinbundang Line will be extended south from Gwanggyo Jungang station to Homaesil station in 2029, with 5 new stations and 11 km of tracks.
- The Line 1 branch to Seodongtan Station will be extended to Dongtan Station by 2029, as part of the construction of the Dongtan-Indeogwon Line. The extension will have 2 stops and a length of 4.6 km.
- GTX-B will open in 2030 between Incheon National University Station in the West and Maseok Station in the South. The line will feature new dedicated tracks, except East of Mangu station where it will share tracks with the Gyeongchun Line. In total, the length of the line will be 80.3 km, with 13 stations.
- The Daejang–Hongdae Line will be a medium capacity line between Hongik University Station and Daejang Station in the city of Bucheon. Groundbreaking occurred in late 2025 and is scheduled to open in the first half of 2031. The line will have a length of 20.1 km and 11 stations

== Approved for construction ==
The following lines have not started construction, but are considered to be approved after their plans and their financing have been finalized. Most of these lines are scheduled to start construction in the next couple of years.

- The Wirye–Sinsa Line, a light metro line in southeastern Seoul, will open between Sinsa station and Wirye with 11 stations planned. Construction has been delayed due to issues with the contractors.
- Line 9 will also be further extended to the East, with 6 new stations, from Saemteo Park to Pungyang, for a length of 11.7 km. Completion is planned for 2032.
- The Shinbundang Line will be extended north from Sinsa station to Yongsan station, with 3 new stations over 5.3 km. Construction will begin in 2026 for a completion in 2032, upon the completion of the transfer of ownership of the Yongsan Garrison to the Korean government.
- The Seobu Line is a new light metro line, which will have a length of 18 km and go through 16 stations, starting at Gwanaksan station, which is also the last station of the Sillim Line, and then go North-West across the Han River and up to Saejeol station on Line 6. Construction will begin in 2025.
- Myeonmok Line is a light metro in the northeastern area of Seoul running between Cheongnyangni station and Sinnae station with 12 stations and connections to the Gyeongchun Line and Line 6. The line was approved in June 2024.
- Dongtan Metro is a set of 2 tramway lines, which will be part of the Seoul Metropolitan Subway, under the names Dongtan Line 1 and Dongtan Line 2, with both lines connecting at Dongtan Station. Dongtan Line 1 will have 17 stations over 16.9 km, while Dongtan Line 2 will have 19 stations over 15.5 km. Construction will begin in early 2025 for an opening by December 2027.
- The Ui LRT will have a new Northern branch, starting from Solbat Park Station, and reaching Banghak Station on Line 1, for a length of 3.5 km and 3 new stations. Construction will begin in 2025 for a completion in 2031.
- Line 3 will be extended to the East, with 8 new stations across the Han river and northwards from Saemteo Park station to Pungyang station, for a length of 17.4 km. Construction should begin in 2025 for completion in 2031.

== Planned ==
=== Seoul City ===
The Seoul Metropolitan government published a ten-year plan for expansion of the subway with the following projects under consideration.

- Gangbukhoengdan Line, a new line running in an arc north of Seoul between Cheongnyangni station and Mok-dong station with 19 stations planned. The line will provide transfers to Lines 1, 3, 4, 5, 6, 9, AREX, Gyeongui–Jungang, Gyeongchun, Bundang and Ui line.
- Ui LRT will open a branch line from Solbat Park station to Banghak station on Line 1, the extension will open with 3 stations.
- Myeonmok Line is a light metro in the northeastern area of Seoul running between Cheongnyangni station and Sinnae station with 12 stations and connections to the Gyeongchun Line and Line 6.
- Nangok Line is a branch of the light metro Sillim Line in the southwestern area of Seoul running between Nangok-dong and Boramae Park with 5 stations planned.
- Mok-dong Line is a light metro in southwestern Seoul running between Sinwol-dong and Dangsan station on line 2, with 12 stations planned.
- Line 4 will start running express services between Danggogae station and Namtaeryeong station.
- Line 5 will start running shuttle services connecting Gubeundari station on the mainline and Dunchon-dong station on the Macheon Branch.
- The Sillim Line will be connected to Seobu Line with a track between Seoul National University station (Line 2) and Gwanaksan station at Seoul National Univ.

=== Incheon City ===
The Incheon Metropolitan government is working on the Second Incheon Metro Network Construction Plan that inherits the Incheon Metro Network Construction Plan published in 2016. It includes the construction of five new tram lines. The draft was expected to be released in October 2020.

- Incheon Subway line 3 is planned to be a semi-circular subway line of Incheon. It will intersect Seoul Line 1 at Dowon station and to Incheon Line 1 at Dongmak station.

== Gallery ==
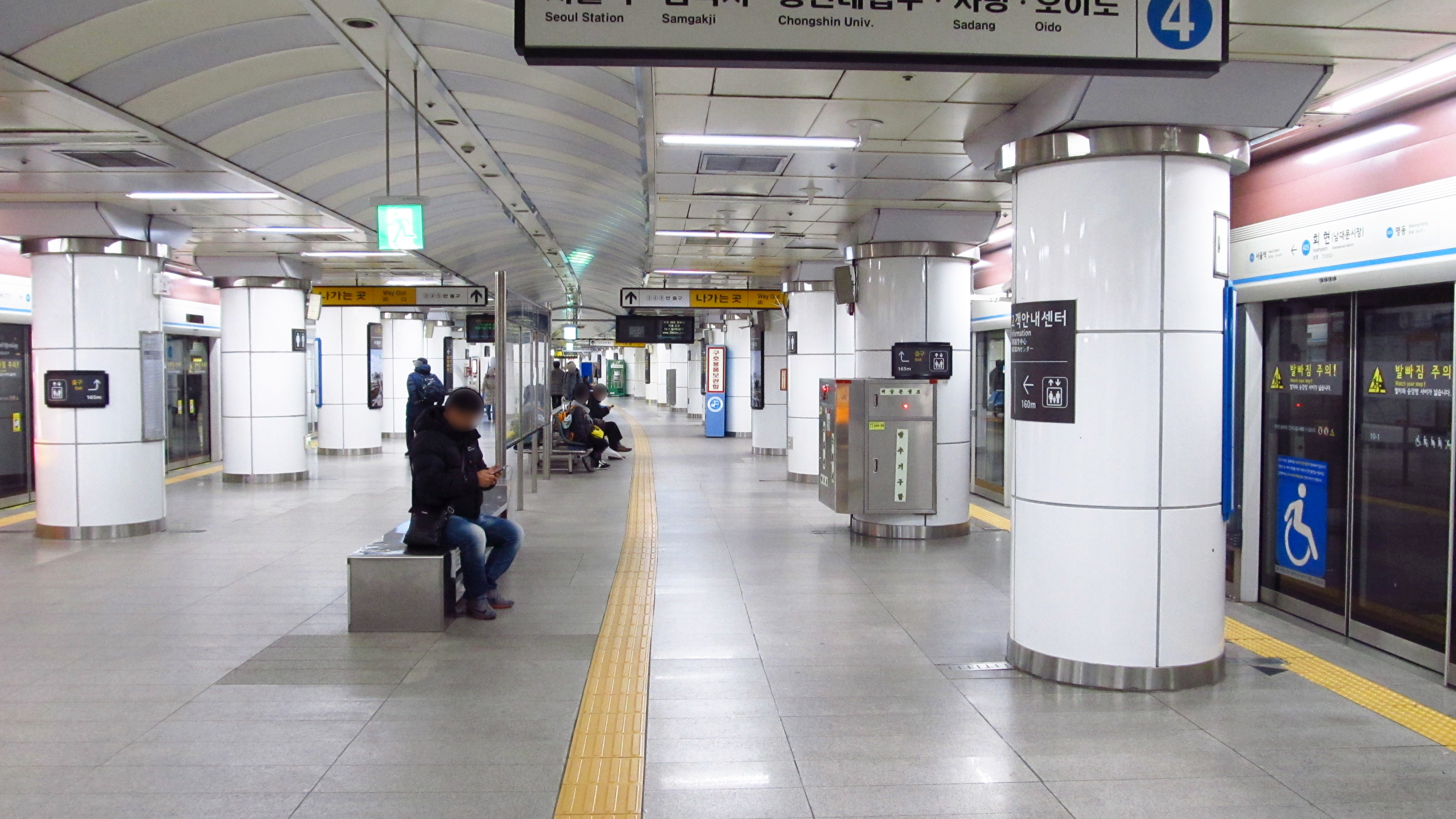
The platform at Hoehyeon Station on Seoul Subway Line 4 in Jung-gu, Seoul

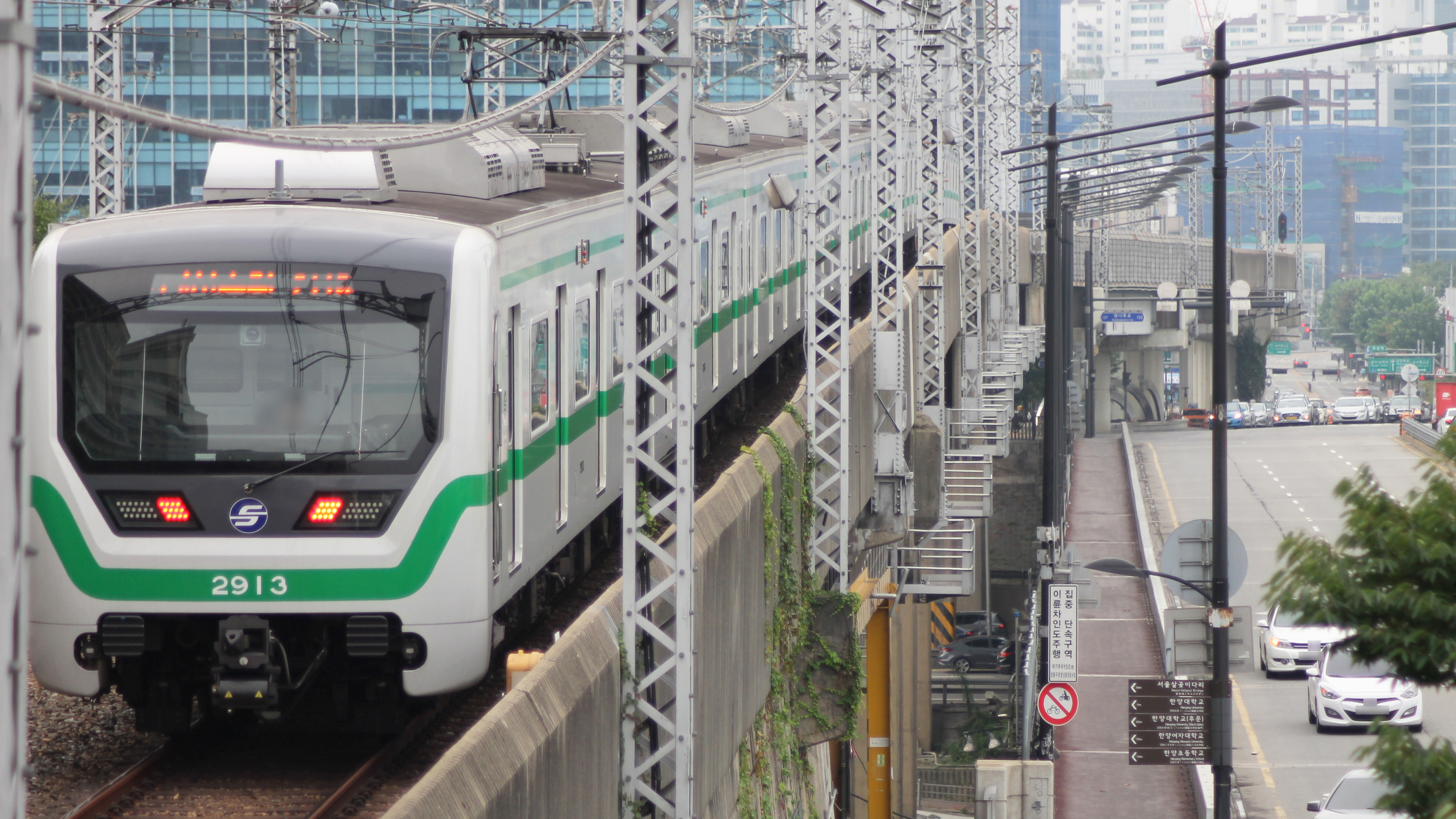
Seoul Metro Class 2000 series 10-car EMU set 2x13 leaving Hanyang University Station on the Seoul Metro Line 2 in Seongdong-gu, Seoul

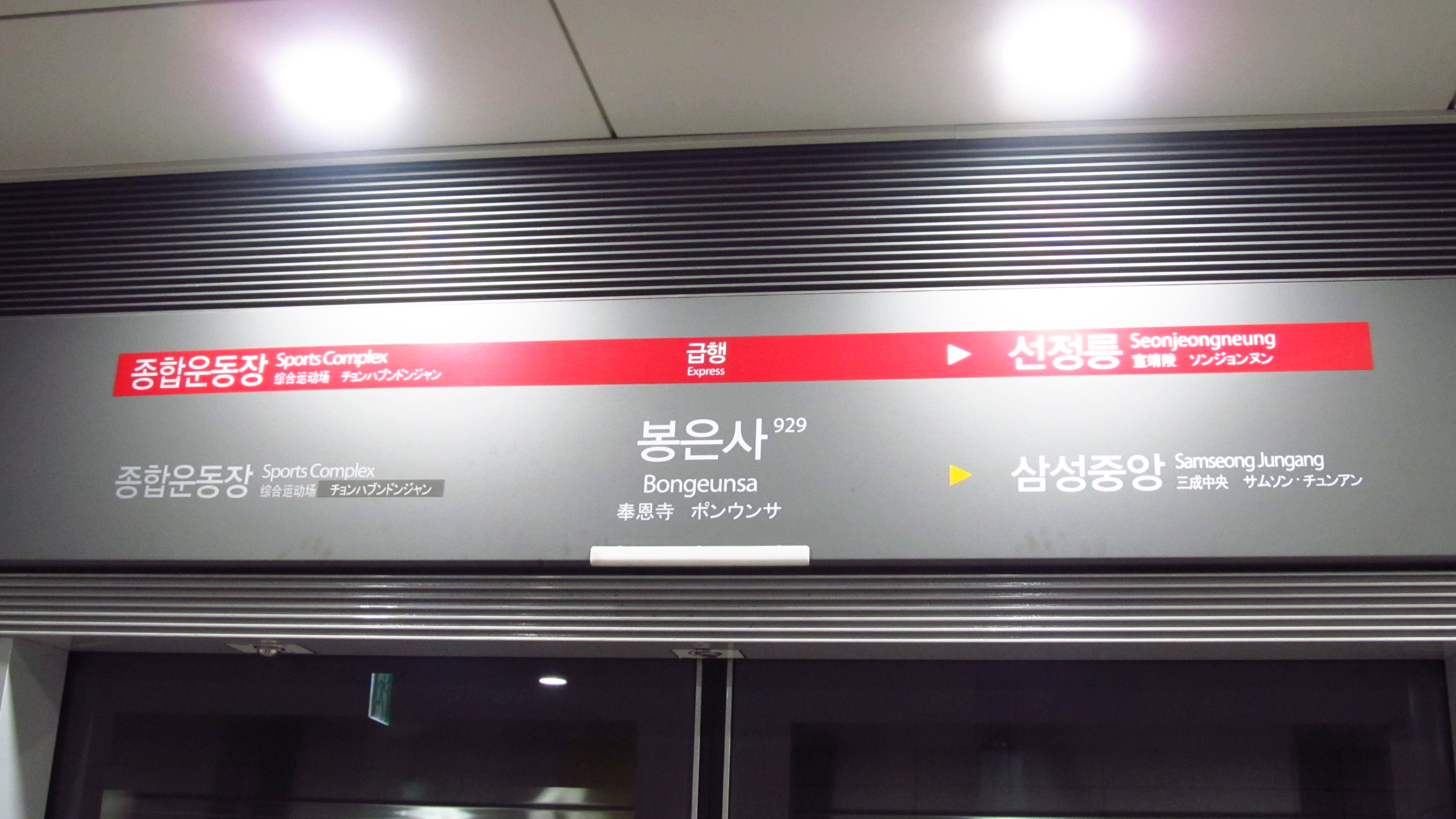
A sign of Bongeunsa Station on Seoul Subway Line 9

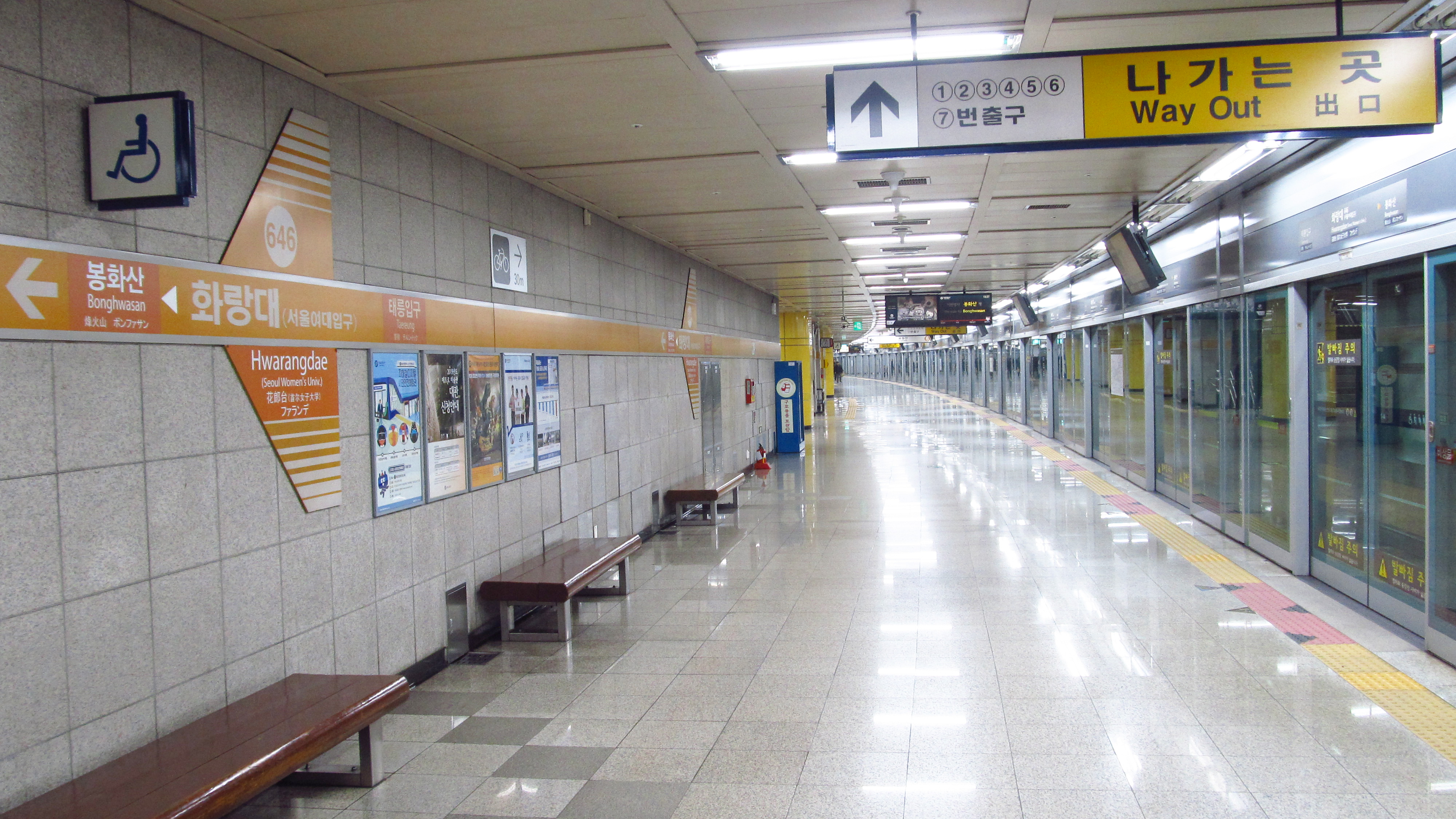
The platform at Hwarangdae Station on Seoul Subway Line 6 in Nowon-gu, Seoul

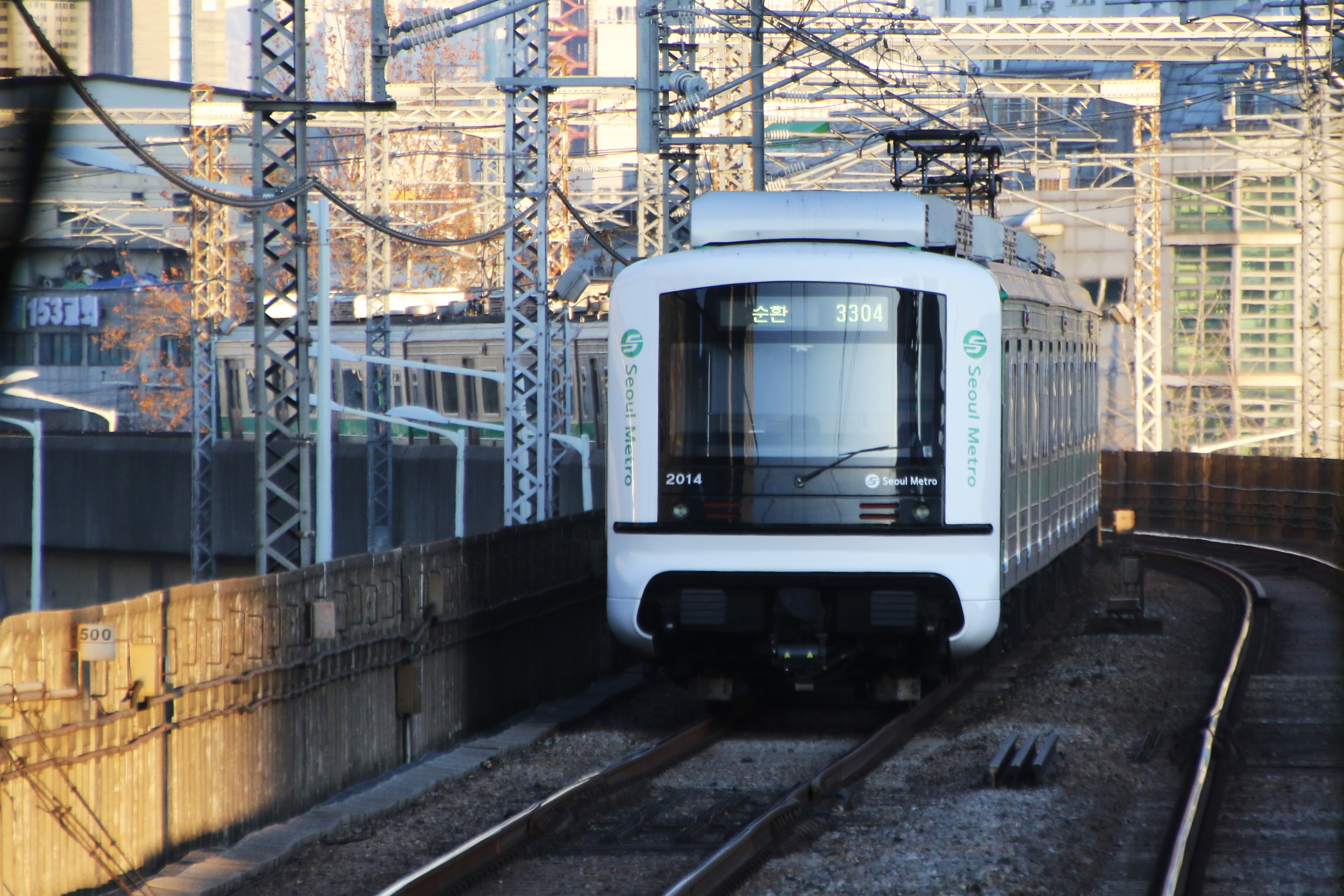
Seoul Metro Line 2 Inner Circle Line train arriving at Guro Digital Complex (2-14 new)

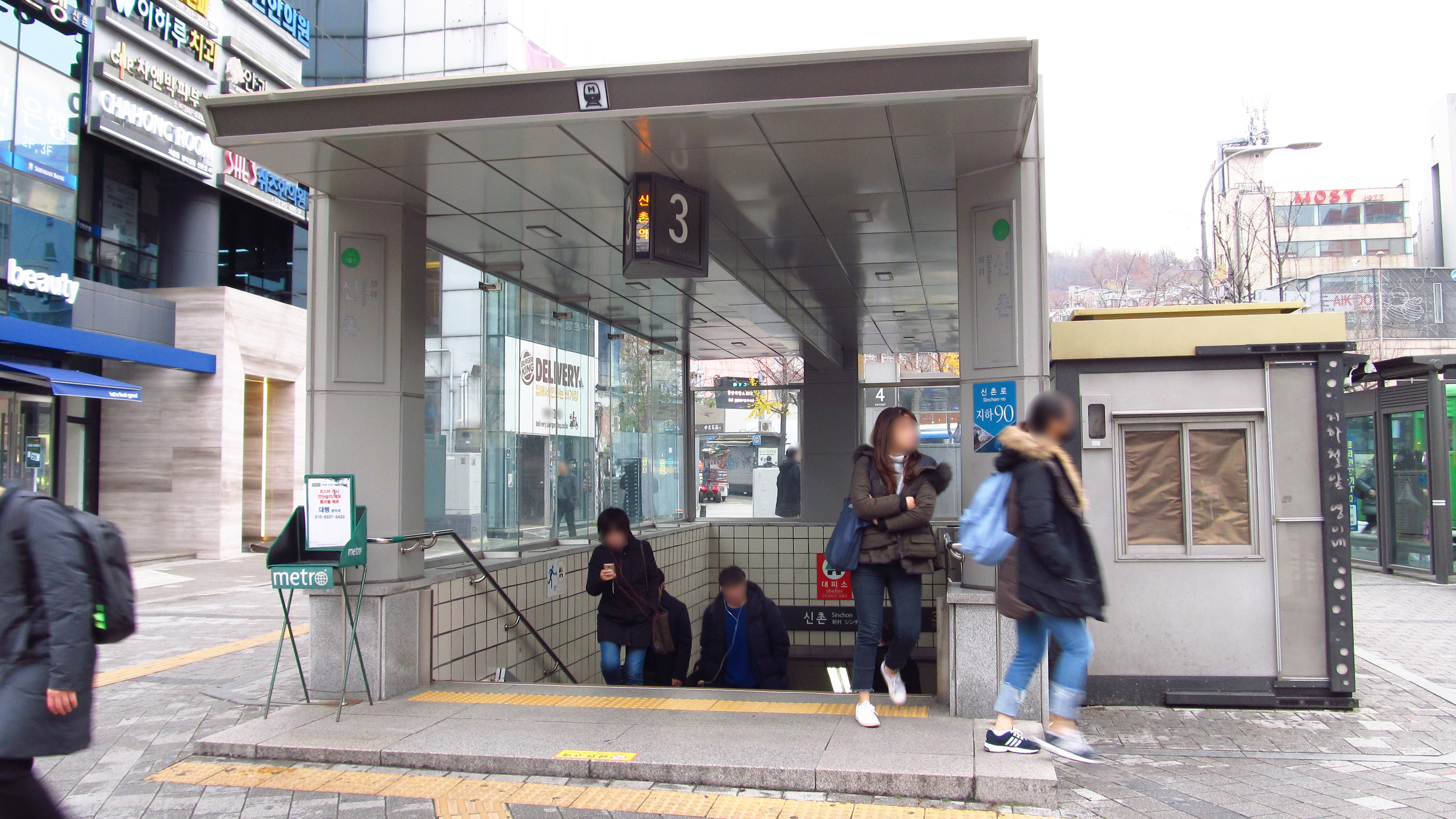
The no.3 entrance to Sinchon Station on the Seoul Metro Line 2 in Mapo-gu, Seoul

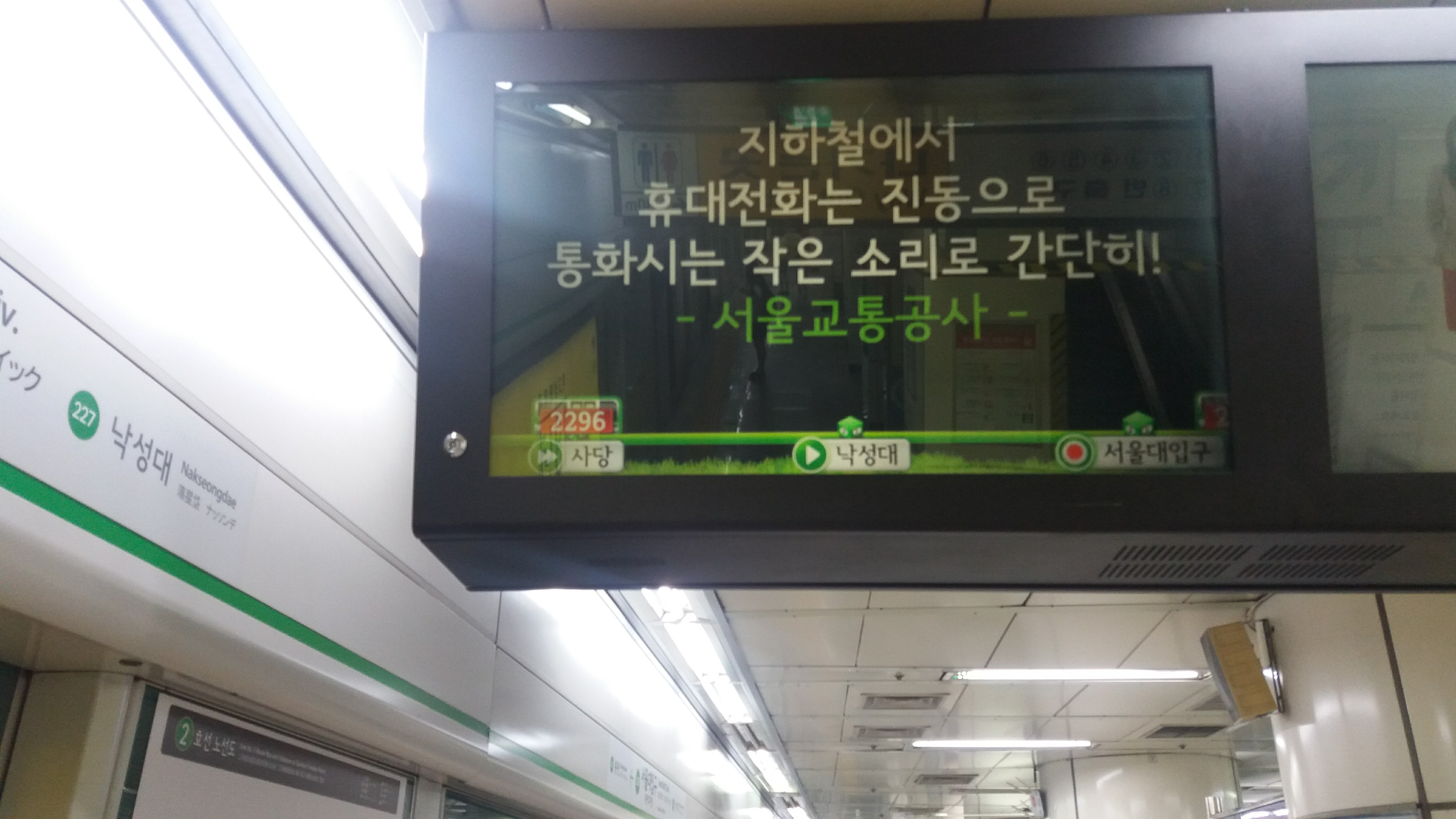
Seoul Metro Line 2 LCD

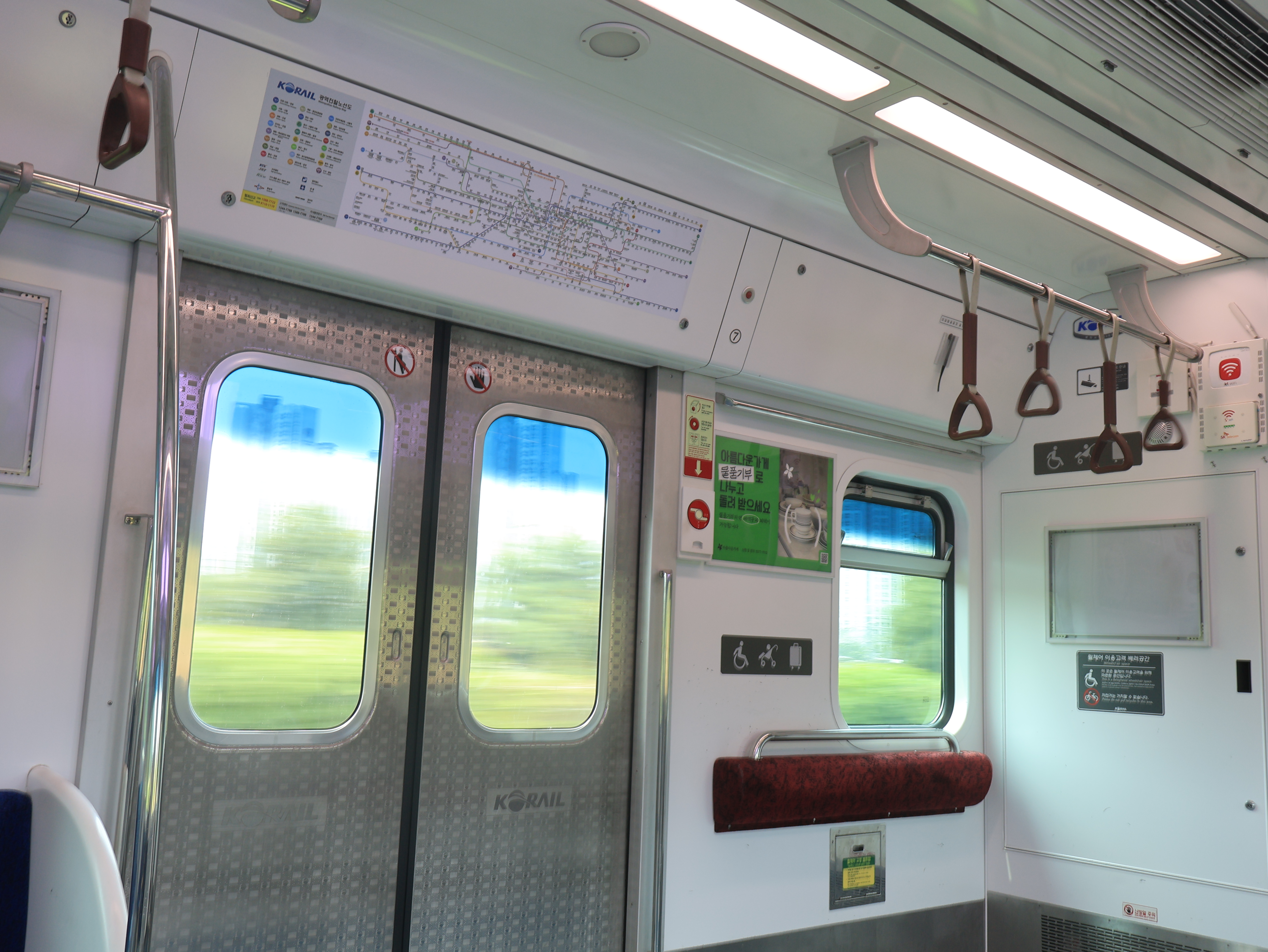
Space for wheelchair stroller carrier (inside the train)

== See also ==
- Seoul Light Rapid Transit
- Incheon Subway
- Pyongyang Metro
- Seoul Metropolitan Subway stations
- Transport in South Korea
- List of metro systems
- List of tram and light rail transit systems
- Incheon Airport Maglev
