= Seryu station =

Metro station in Suwon, South Korea

Coordinates: 37°14′39″N 127°00′51″E

세류; Seryu
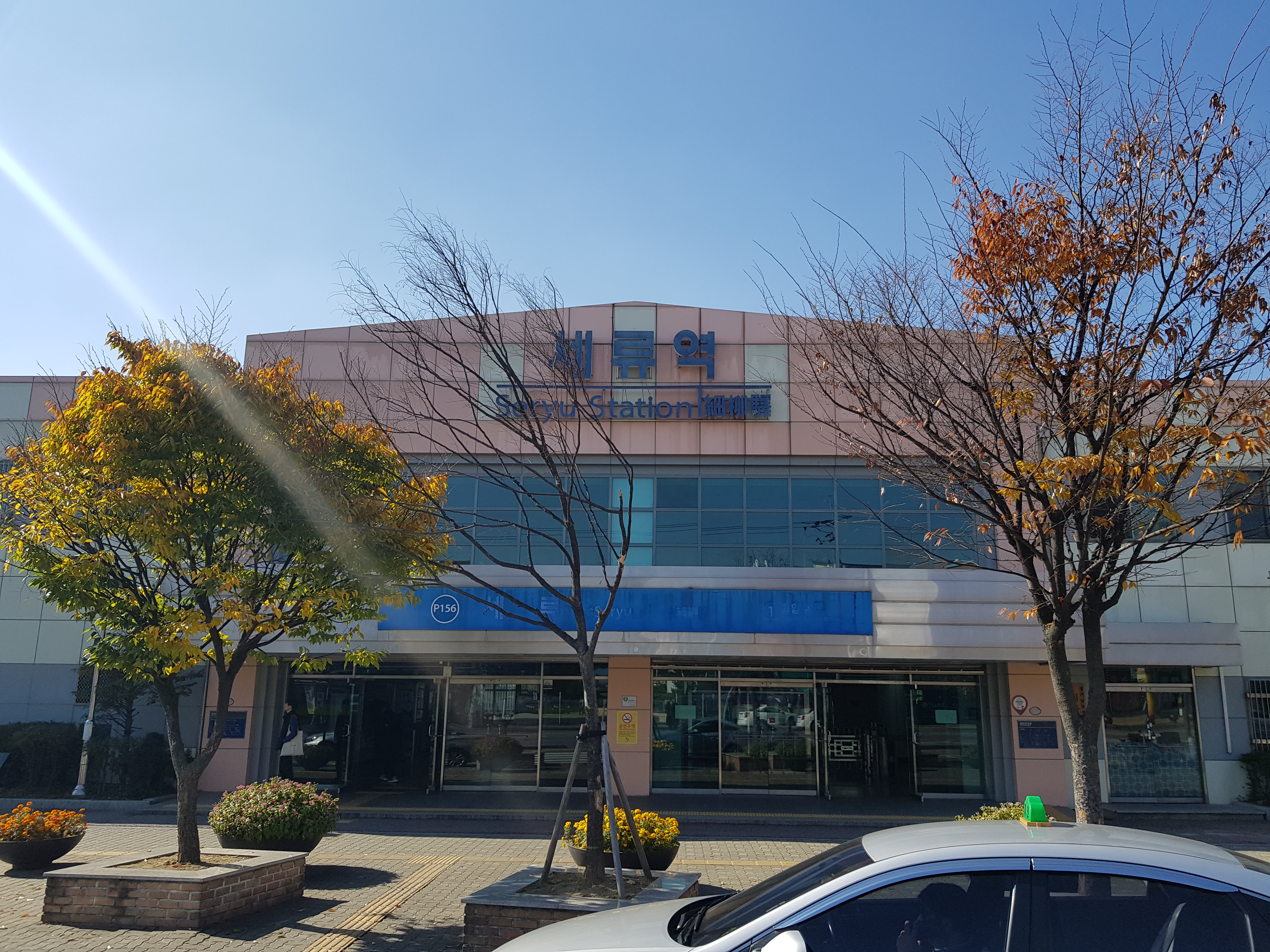

Korean name
- Hangul: 세류역
- Hanja: 細柳驛
- RR: Seryu-yeok
- MR: Seryu-yŏk

General information
- Location: 44-7 Jangji-dong, 387 Jeongjoro, Gwonseon-gu, Suwon-si, Gyeonggi-do
- Operator: Korail
- Line: Gyeongbu Line
- Platforms: 2
- Tracks: 3

Construction
- Structure type: Aboveground

History
- Opened: March 10, 1954; April 30, 2003

Passengers
- (Daily) Based on Jan-Dec 2012. Line 1: 9,594

Services
Preceding station	Seoul Metropolitan Subway	Following station
Suwon towards Kwangwoon University	Line 1	Byeongjeom towards Seodongtan or Sinchang
Location

Seryu station is a station on Line 1 of the Seoul Metropolitan Subway. It is in southern Suwon. Near Seryu station lies Suwon Air Base, home to the ROKAF's 10th Fighter Wing. It is between Suwon station and Byeongjeom station.

== Gallery ==
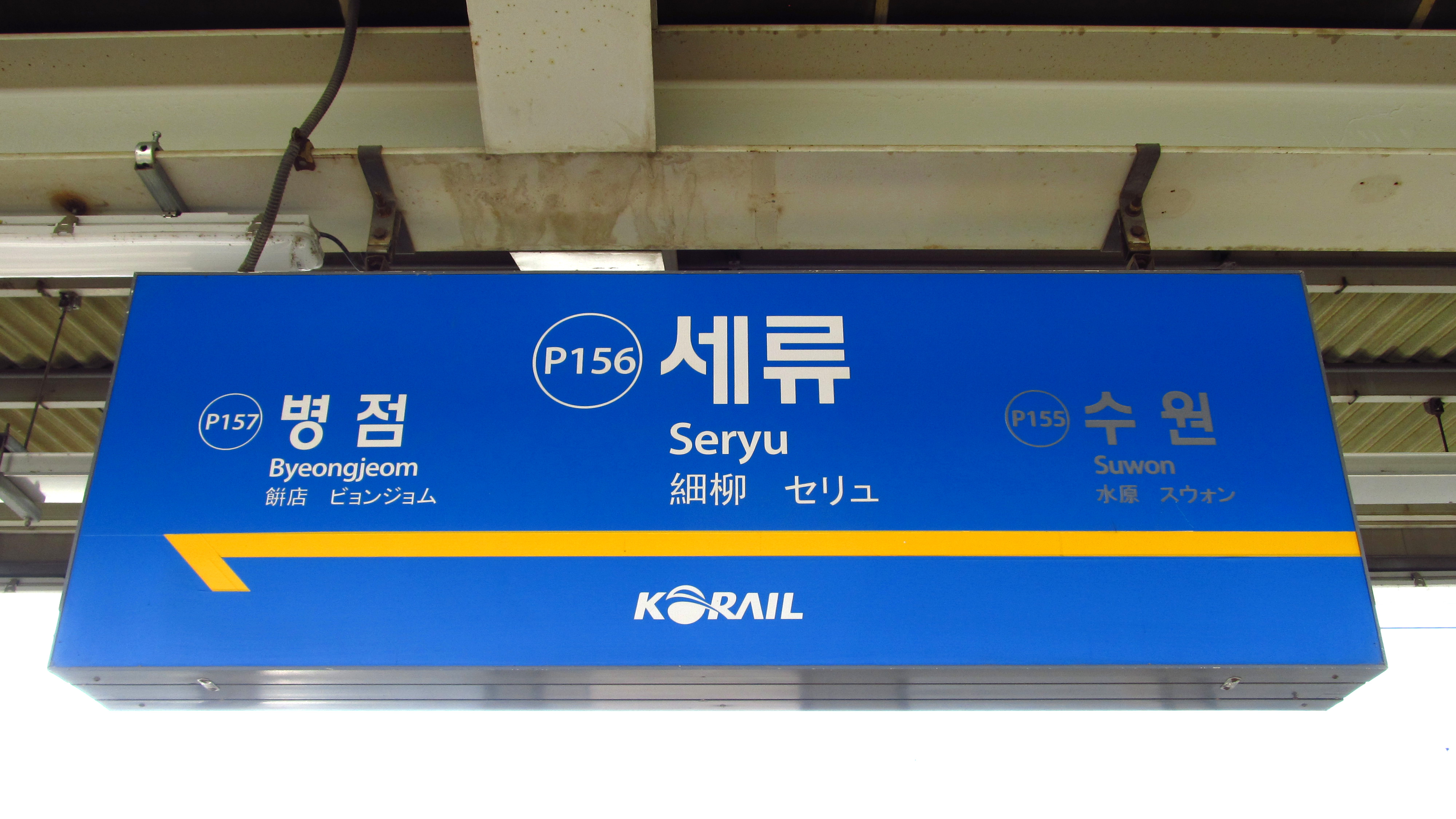
Station nameplate

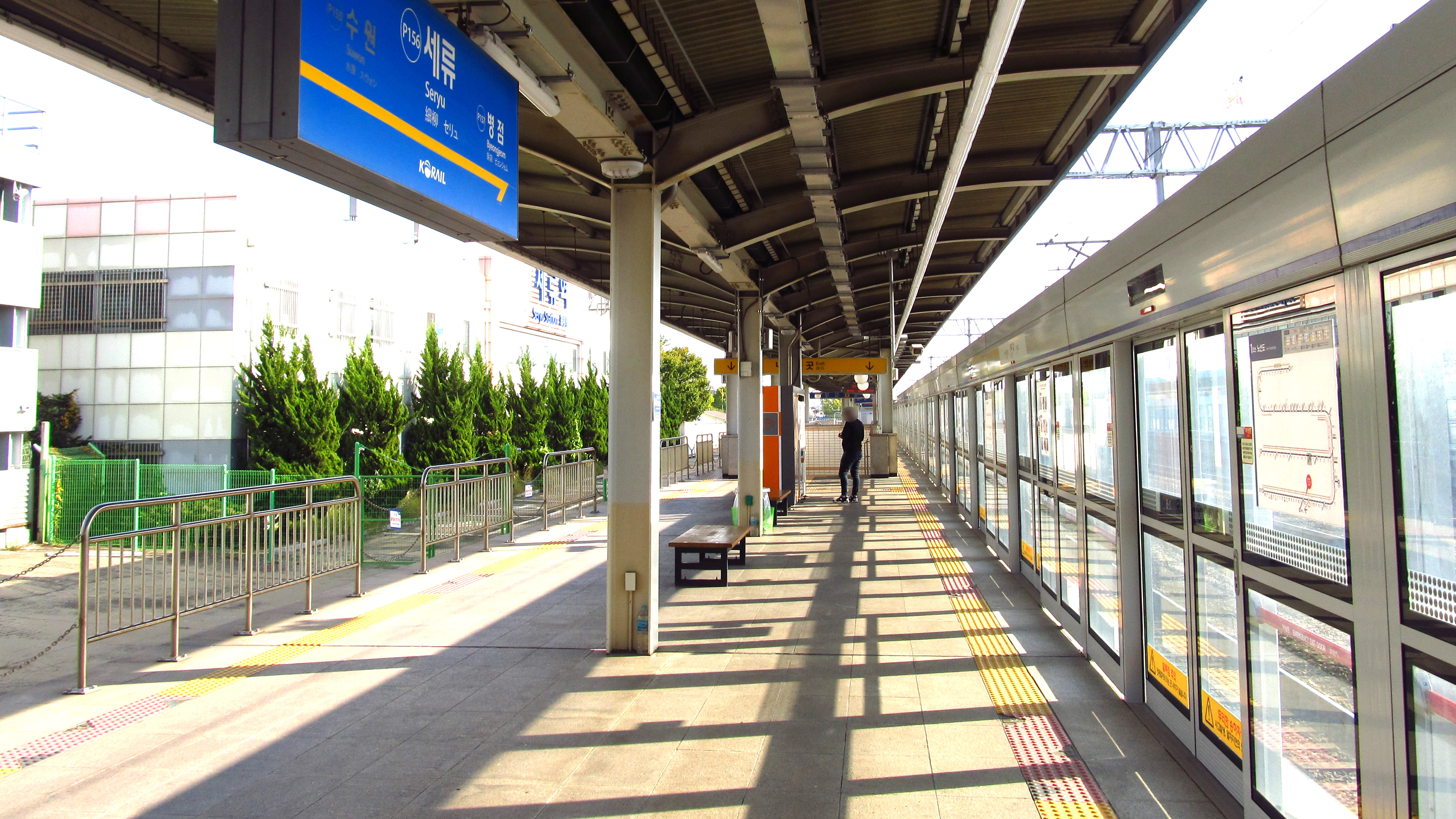
Station platform
