= Byeongjeom Depot Line =

Railway line in South Korea

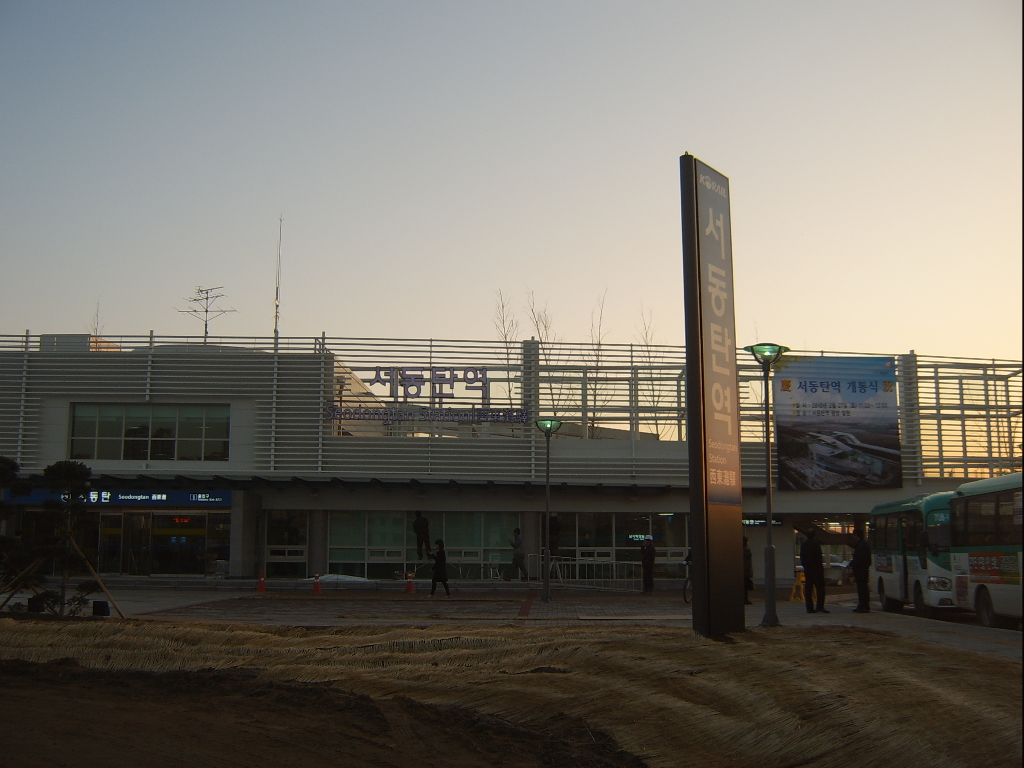

Korean name
- Hangul: 병점기지선
- Hanja: 餠店基地線
- Revised Romanization: Byeongjeomgijiseon
- McCune–Reischauer: Pyŏngjŏmgijisŏn

Byeongjeom Depot Line is a subway line operated by Seoul Metropolitan Subway, in Seoul, South Korea. It is part of Seoul Metro's Line 1. It opened to the public on February 26, 2010.

This branch will be extended to Dongtan station after the construction of Dongtan–Indeogwon Line.

== Stations ==
Station number	Station name English	Station name Hangul	Station name Hanja	Transfer	Location
P157	Byeongjeom	병점	餠店		Hwaseong
	Byeongjeom Depot	병점기지	餠店基地		Hwaseong
P157-1	Seodongtan	서동탄	西東灘		Osan

== See also ==
- Subways in South Korea
- Seoul Subway Line 1
