= Buses in Seoul =

Public transportation in Seoul, South Korea

In Seoul, public transit buses are operated by the Seoul Metropolitan Government and private bus operators. The city maintains a quasi-public system where the city manages where the routes run, but private companies manage the running of the individual routes themselves.

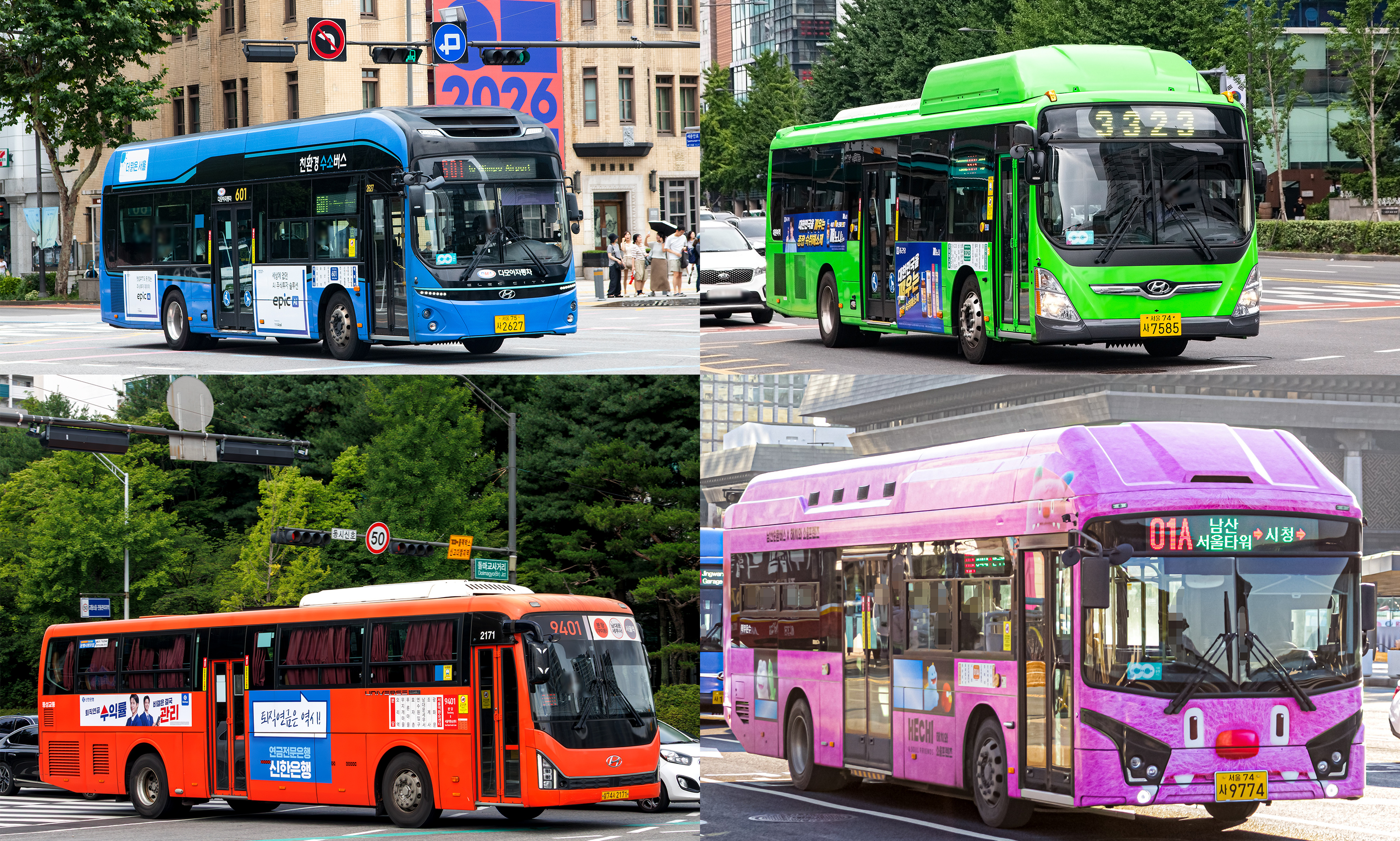
The four colors used to identify different Seoul buses

== Bus types ==
There are four types of buses:

- Trunk Bus (Blue) : Trunk buses are operated partly by private bus companies and partly by the city government. It runs for longer distance and has access to median bus lanes connecting suburban areas to downtown Seoul. The city has taken full consideration to introducing 3 kinds of buses belonging to the Blue Bus category: articulated buses (since retired), low floor buses, and high floor buses. The blue color represents Seoul's skyline and Hangang (River), which in turn symbolize security and freedom.
- Branch Bus (Green) : Branch buses are flexibly operated by private bus companies. It runs for shorter distance connecting major subway stations or bus terminals outside downtown Seoul. It is similar to the city bus and the community shuttle bus currently in operation. The green color represents the mountains surrounding the city.
- Rapid Bus (Red) : Rapid buses are express buses designed especially for passengers commuting between downtown Seoul and the metropolitan area. The red color represents the energy of speed.
- Circulation Bus (Yellow) : Circulation buses will circle parts of Seoul and stop at stations near business areas, tourist areas, and shopping areas, as well as providing connections to trunk/branch buses, subway stations, and major railway stations. The color yellow was selected for its dynamic and friendly image. Circulation buses routes have been slowly discontinued, with the last remaining routes being the three Namsan loop buses.
- Village Buses (Green, small) : Village buses are short auxiliary routes that feed local subway stations and other larger lines. Village buses are shorter and a different style than the other four categories of buses.

== Routes ==
Route numbers specify area divisions. For trunk and branch buses, the first digit indicates the area where the route begins, and the second digit indicates where the route ends. For rapid buses, the first digit is always 9, and the second digit indicates the area in which the route begins. The first digit of circulation buses indicates the area in which the bus circles. Routes that begin with an 8 are holiday or rush-hour only branch buses. For all lines, any remaining digits identify individual routes.

=== Numbering system for routes ===
The following list shows the numbering system of routes based by area. This system was created to facilitate recognition of route outlines.

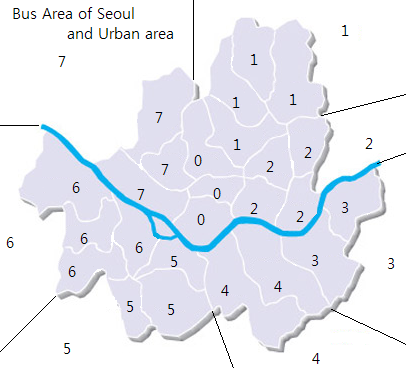

- Area 0 : Central Seoul (Jongno District, Jung District, Yongsan District)
- Area 1 : Dobong District, Gangbuk District, Seongbuk District, Nowon District. (also Uijeongbu, Yangju)
- Area 2 : Dongdaemun District, Jungnang District, Seongdong District, Gwangjin District. (also Guri, Namyangju)
- Area 3 : Gangdong District, Songpa District. (also Hanam, Gwangju (Gyeonggi Province))
- Area 4 : Seocho District, Gangnam District. (also Seongnam, Yongin)
- Area 5 : Dongjak District, Gwanak District, Geumcheon District. (also Anyang, Gwacheon, Uiwang, Ansan, Gunpo, Suwon)
- Area 6 : Gangseo District, Yangcheon District, Yeongdeungpo District, Guro District. (also Incheon, Bucheon, Gwangmyeong, Gimpo, Siheung)
- Area 7 : Eunpyeong District, Mapo District, Seodaemun District. (also Goyang, Paju)

== Vehicles ==
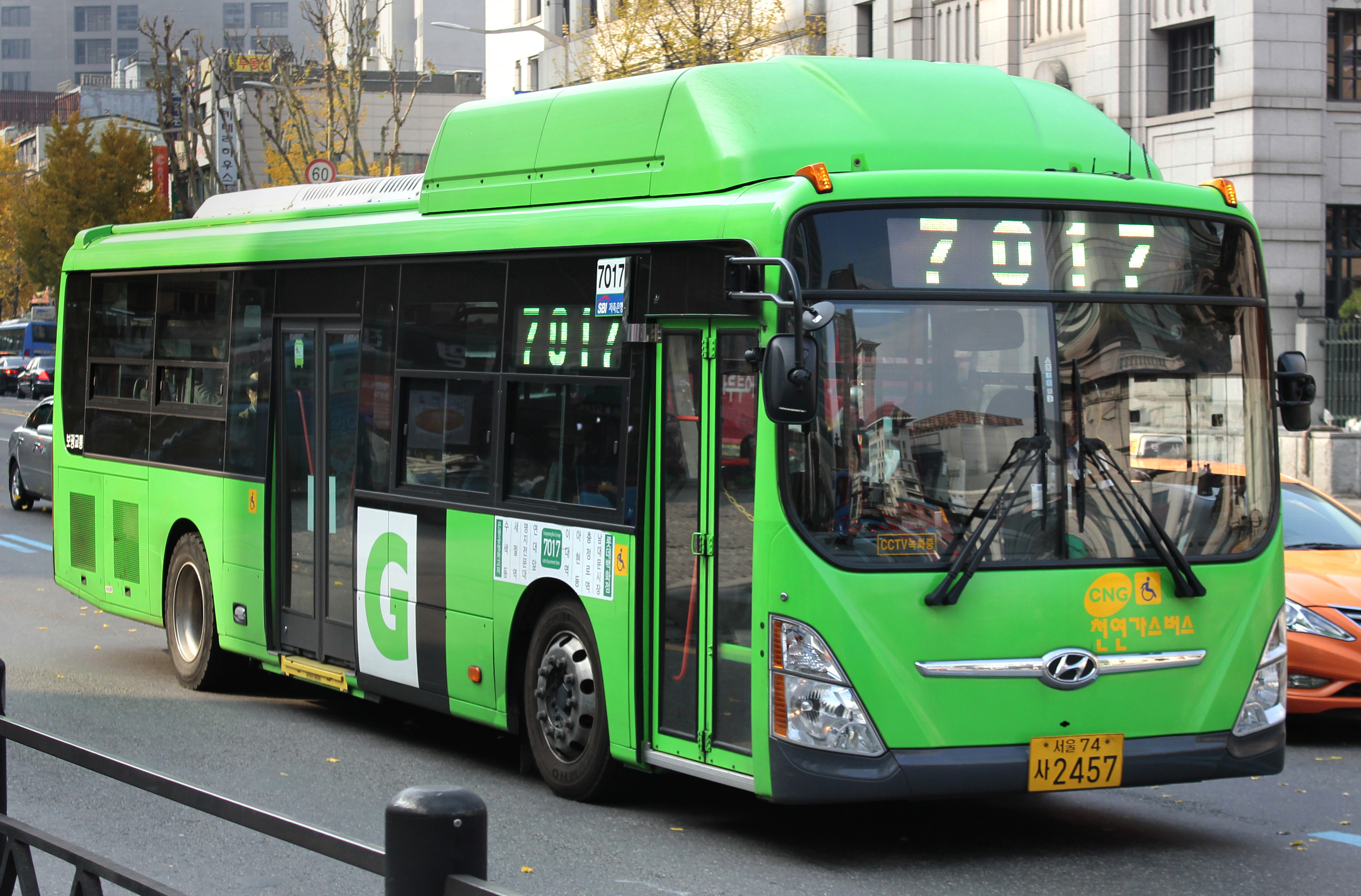
New Super Aero City for 7017

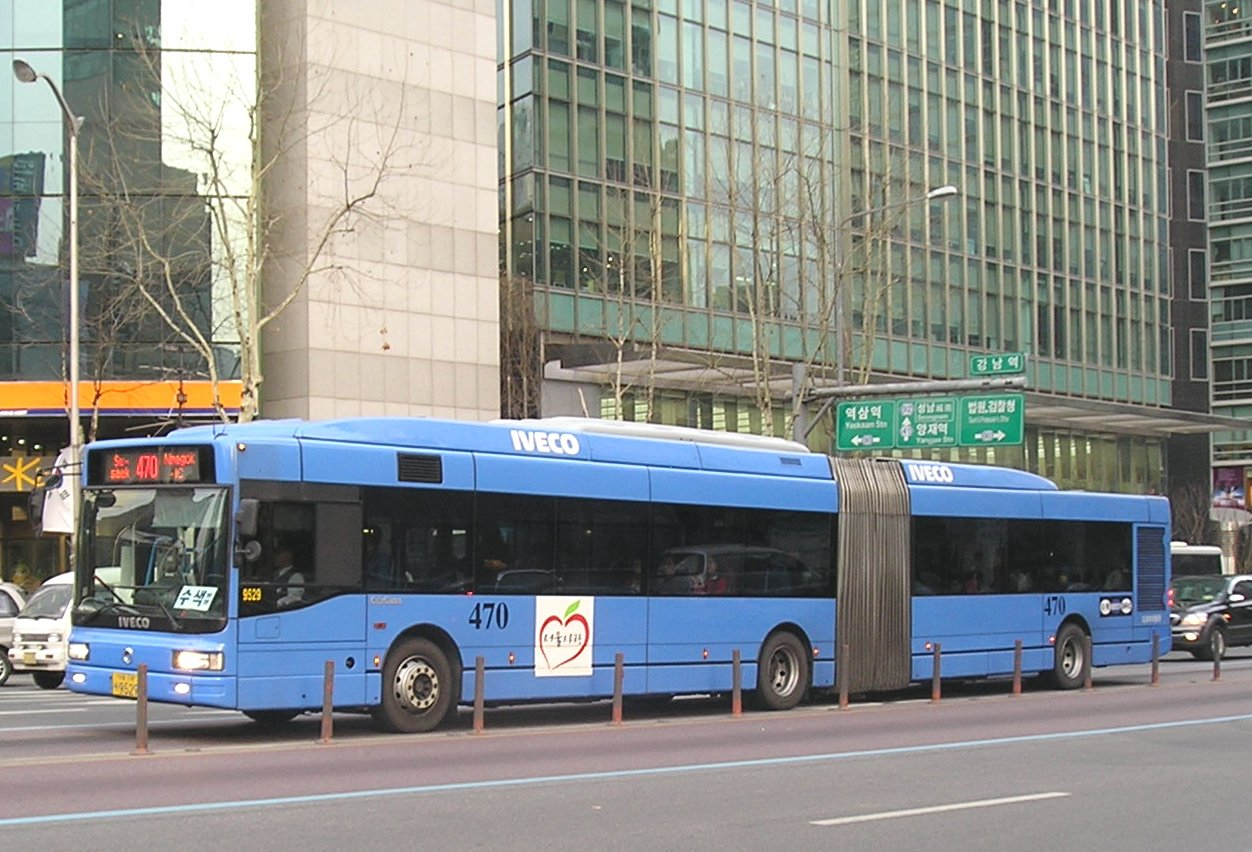
Iveco CityClass (18m) for 470

Most buses in South Korea are domestic models and are made by Hyundai, Daewoo and Edison Motors (acquired by and rebranded to KGM). Buses are either 9 m (29 ft 6 5/16 in) or 10.6 m (34 ft 9 5/16 in) to 11 m (36 ft 1 1/16 in) Buses use either compressed natural gas, electric batteries, or a combination of both. In the past, diesel buses also ran until retirement, and Daewoo buses measuring 12 m (39 ft 4 7/16 in) in length and Iveco articulated buses measuring 18 m (59 ft 11/16 in) in length were in service on trunk buses from 2004 until 2014.

Rapid buses operate with coach buses, specifically the Hyundai Universe. The majority of these are diesel-powered, however a small subset are powered by hydrogen fuel cells.

== In popular culture ==
The South Korean animated children's television series Tayo the Little Bus, which is available on Hulu, Netflix and on many stations throughout the world, is based on Seoul's bus system. Each of the four main characters is a different color (type) of bus, with the title character Tayo being a blue/trunk bus.

== See also ==
- Seoul
- Seoul Subway
- T-money: Transportation Card System
- Upass (South Korea): Transportation Card System
- Transportation in Bundang
- Incheon Buses
- Gyeonggi Buses
- Busan Buses
- Daejeon Buses
- List of Seoul Bus routes
