= Upass =

South Korean public transportation card

- Location: Seoul Metropolitan Area
- Launched: June 1996
- Discontinued: 15 October 2014
- Successor: T-money
- Technology: MIFARE
- Operator: Seoul Bus Transport Association
- Manager: Seoul Bus Transport Association
- Currency: KRW
- Credit expiry: None
- Validity: Seoul Subway; Seoul buses
- Retailed: kiosks in Seoul (formerly)
- Website: http://www.u-pass.kr/ (Redirects to T-money)

Upass (Korean: 유패스) was a prepaid card for the transportation system in Seoul and its suburbs. The card was issued by Seoul Bus Transport Association and eB Card. Its parent-generation card is Seoul Transportation Card, a world-first commercial-used RF card for transportation (first used in June 1996)¹. The Korean system integrator Intec and Seoul Bus Union first launched a test of their system in a trial from October to December 1995. Currently, Upass has been discontinued, replaced by the newer T-money card. Existing cards still can be used in T-money areas.

== Technology ==
Upass, and older Seoul transportation card system is based on MIFARE Standard, Ultralight and PROX technology.

== Use ==
Before its discontinuation in October 2014, many kiosks around Seoul sold various types of Upass cards. Major banks and credit card companies, including favored Kookmin Bank and BC Card, issued Upass compatible credit/debit cards marked with PayOn, MasterCard, Paypass or Visa Paywave. Upass is accepted by:

- All Seoul, Gyeonggi-do, Incheon, Cheonan, Asan buses
- Seoul Subway and AREX
- Gyeonggi-do intercity buses which accept payment via transportation cards.
