= Yunggeolleung =

Royal tomb in South Korea

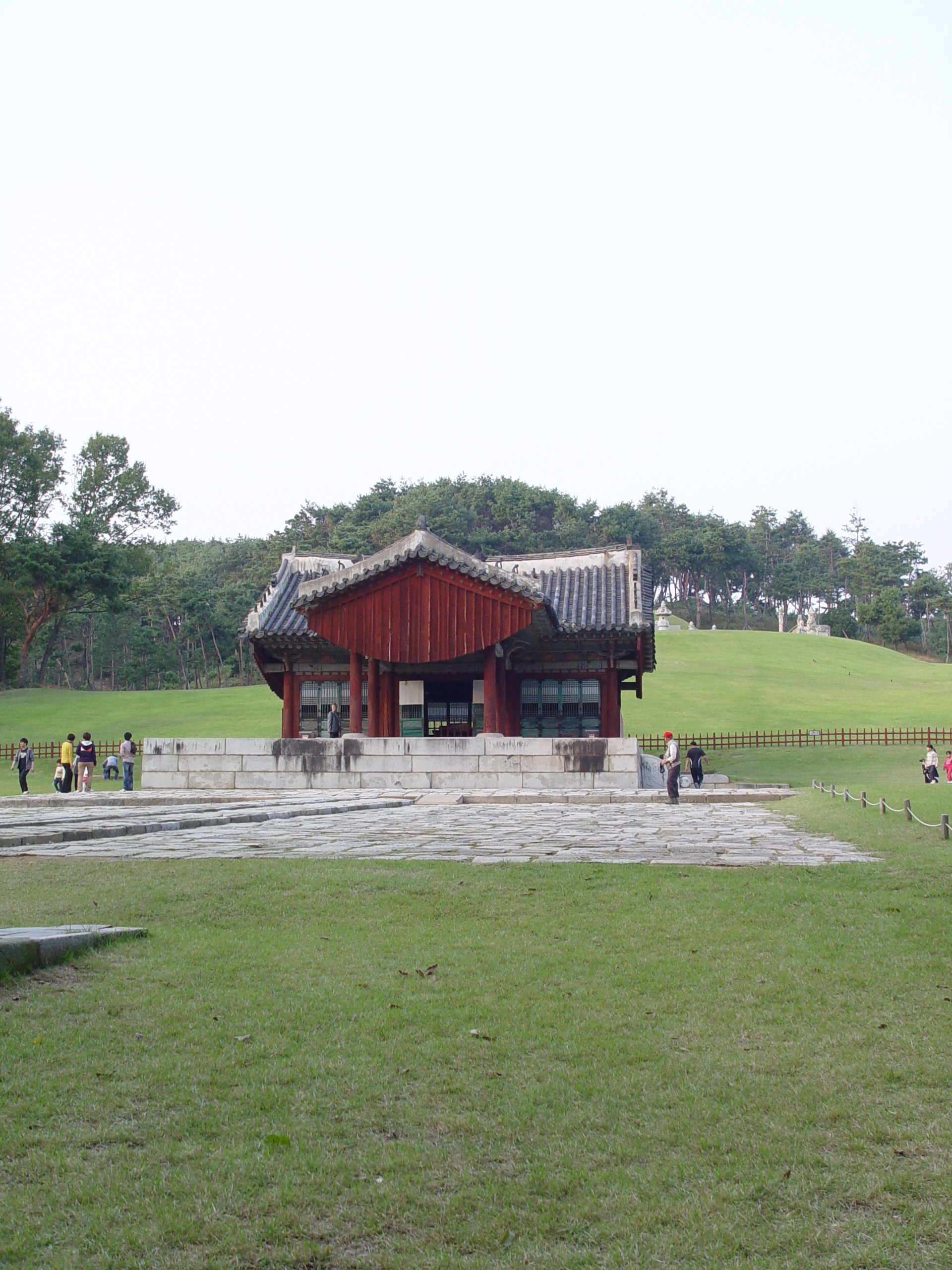
- Geolleung

- Yunggeolleung
- 37°12′44″N 126°59′26″E
- Location: Hwaseong, Gyeonggi Province, South Korea

History
- Built: 1816–1821

Site notes
- Governing body: Cultural Heritage Administration of Korea

UNESCO World Heritage Site
- Type: Cultural
- Criteria: iii, iv, vi
- Designated: 2009 (33rd session)
- Reference no.: 1319
- Region: Asia and Australasia

Korean name
- Hangul: 융건릉
- Hanja: 隆健陵
- RR: Yunggeolleung
- MR: Yunggŏllŭng

Yunggeolleung (Korean: 융건릉; Hanja: 隆健陵) is a burial ground from the Joseon dynasty, located within an oak-forested park in Hwaseong, South Korea. Yungneung is the tomb of Crown Prince Sado and Lady Hyegyeong (posthumously honored as King Jangjo and Queen Heongyeong), while Geolleung houses King Jeongjo and Queen Hyoui. They are an UNESCO World Heritage Site.

== Yungneung ==
37°12′42″N 126°59′38″E

Crown Prince Sado (1735–1762), having died of starvation at the order of his father King Yeongjo, was buried on Baebongsan Mountain in Yangju, Gyeonggi Province. In 1789, his body was moved to its current location, then called Hyeollyungwon (현륭원), by his son King Jeongjo. In 1816, Sado's wife, Lady Hyegyeong, was buried with him. In 1899, when they were posthumously elevated in status and given the titles King Jangjo and Queen Heongyeong, the tomb was also upgraded and renamed Yungneung (융릉).

The tomb features retaining stones around its perimeter. It is decorated by capstones featuring prominently carved lotuses, possibly to soothe the spirit of Prince Sado, whom his son believed was killed before reaching his full potential. Statues on the downward slope guard the tomb; a wide worship road leads to a shrine, which sits at the bottom of the slope. There are two other buildings in the immediate vicinity: a royal kitchen and a shelter for two memorial steles. The memorial road is accessed via a red spiked wooden gateway located a short distance from a circular pond. This, symbolizing the wish-granting bead of a dragon, and therefore King Jeongjo's love for his father, is an unusual feature for a Joseon royal tomb.

Annual memorial rites are held here on the second Sunday of April.

== Geolleung ==
37°12′50″N 126°59′17″E

On his death in 1800, King Jeongjo was buried on a hill to the east of Yungneung, then called Hyeollyungwon, but on the death of his wife, Queen Hyoui, his body was exhumed and moved to the current site, Geolleung (건릉), where the couple were buried together. The tomb matches Yungneung in layout, though with only one stele and without the pond.

Memorial rites are performed here on the second Sunday of May each year.

== House of the Tomb Keeper ==
37°12′29″N 126°59′23″E

The House of the Tomb Keeper(재실), by the park's entrance, consists of two buildings in a walled courtyard containing an old Chinese juniper and a Korean plum yew. This place is used to prepare the memorial rites.

== Admission ==
The park is open from 9 a.m. to 6.30 p.m. (last admission 5.30) from March to October, closing one hour earlier from November to February, and is closed on Mondays. The entrance fee is 1000 won for adults and 500 won for children.

== Transport ==
The park is accessible by a 40-minute bus ride (number 24 or 46) from Suwon Station, or a 15–minutes ride (number 24, 34, 34-1, 35, 35-1, 44, 50, or 50-1) from Byeongjeom Station (Exit 2).
