= Seodongtan station =

Metro station in Osan, South Korea

Coordinates: 37°11′35″N 127°03′17″E

서동탄; Seodongtan
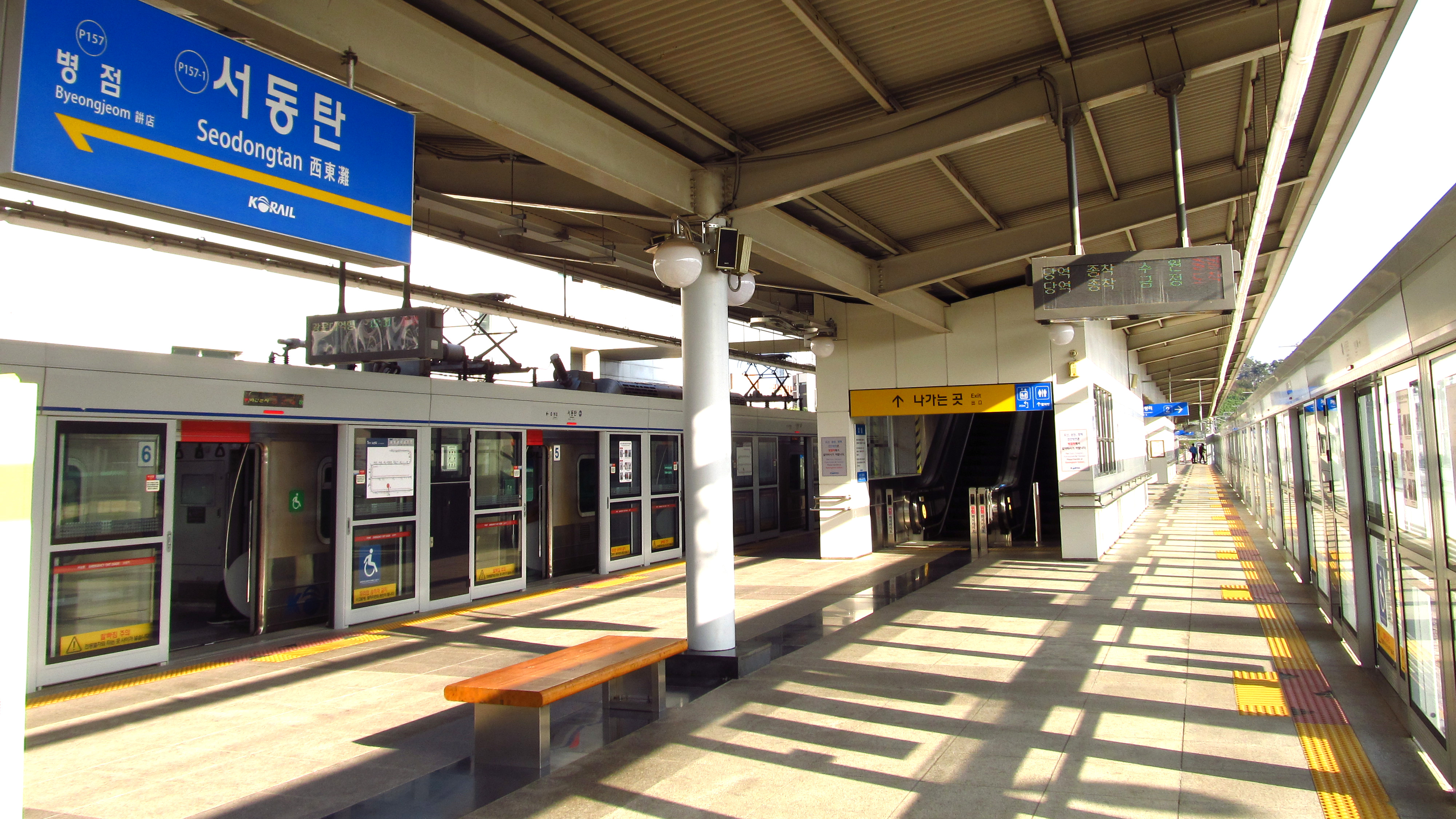
- Station platform

Korean name
- Hangul: 서동탄역
- Hanja: 西東灘驛
- Revised Romanization: Seodongtan-yeok
- McCune–Reischauer: Sŏdongt'an-yŏk

General information
- Other names: West Dongtan
- Location: 87 Oesammiro 15-beon-gil, Osan, Gyeonggi-do
- Operator: Korail
- Line: Byeongjeom Depot Line
- Platforms: 1
- Tracks: 2

Construction
- Structure type: Aboveground

History
- Opened: February 26, 2010; 16 years ago

Passengers
- (Daily) Based on Jan-Dec of 2012. Line 1: 2,448

Services
Preceding station	Seoul Metropolitan Subway	Following station
Byeongjeom towards Kwangwoon University	Line 1 Byeongjeom Depot Line	Terminus
Location

Seodongtan station (Korean: 서동탄역) is a station on Line 1 of the Seoul Metropolitan Subway. It serves the cities of Hwaseong and Osan in Gyeonggi-do, South Korea. The station takes its name (literally West Dongtan) from its local area of the city of Hwaseong, but straddles the border with Osan, in which it is mostly located and its postal address lies.

== History ==
Seodongtan station was opened on February 26, 2010, beside Byeongjeom Depot. It primarily serves residents who reside in Dongtan New Town.

The Byeongjeom Depot Line will be extended to Dongtan station in the future after the construction of Dongtan–Indeogwon Line.

== Station layout ==
L2; Platforms	Northbound	← Line 1 toward Kwangwoon University (Byeongjeom)
L2; Platforms	Island platform, doors will open on the left, right
L2; Platforms	Northbound	← Line 1 toward Kwangwoon University (Byeongjeom)

L1; Concourse	Lobby	Customer Service, Vending machines, ATMs

G	Street level	Exit
