= Byeongjeom station =

Station of the Seoul Metropolitan Subway

Coordinates: 37°12′24″N 127°01′59″E

병점; Byeongjeom
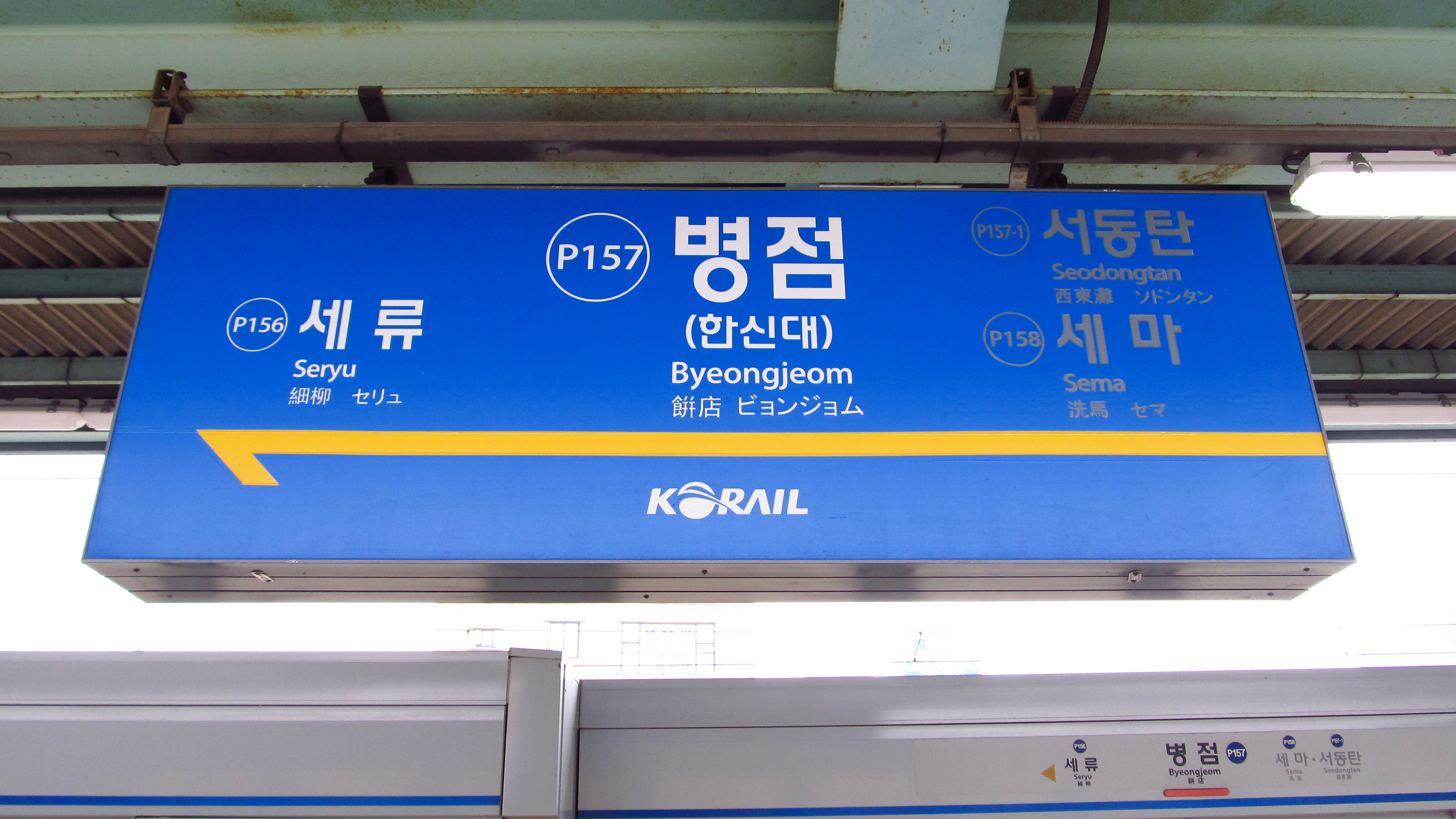

Korean name
- Hangul: 병점역
- Hanja: 餠店驛
- RR: Byeongjeom-yeok
- MR: Pyŏngjŏm-yŏk

General information
- Location: 824-1 Jinan-dong, 97 Ddokjeongollo, Hwaseong-si, Gyeonggi-do
- Operator: Korail
- Lines: Gyeongbu Line, Byeongjeom Depot Line
- Platforms: 2
- Tracks: 4

Construction
- Structure type: Aboveground

History
- Opened: January 1, 1905; 30 April 2003

Passengers
- (Daily) Based on Jan–Dec 2012. Line 1: 30,669
Services
Preceding station	Seoul Metropolitan Subway	Following station
Seryu towards Kwangwoon University	Line 1	Sema towards Sinchang
Suwon towards Cheongnyangni or Seoul	Line 1 Gyeongbu Express	Osan towards Sinchang
Seryu towards Kwangwoon University	Line 1 Byeongjeom Depot Line	Seodongtan Terminus
Location

Byeongjeom station (Korean: 병점 (한신대)) is a station on Line 1 of the Seoul Metropolitan Subway. It is the only train station serving the city of Hwaseong. It is the penultimate station for approximately half of the subway trains on this line who then carry on Seodongtan, with the remainder continuing to Cheonan or Sinchang.

Many centers of higher education, including Hanshin University, Suwon Science College and the University of Suwon, are located nearby, and shuttle buses run regularly between there and the campuses. In addition, Yungneung (융릉; 隆陵) and Geolleung (건릉; 健陵) – the royal tombs of Crown Prince Sado and his son King Jeongjo, the 22nd ruler of the Joseon Dynasty – lie to the west of the station.

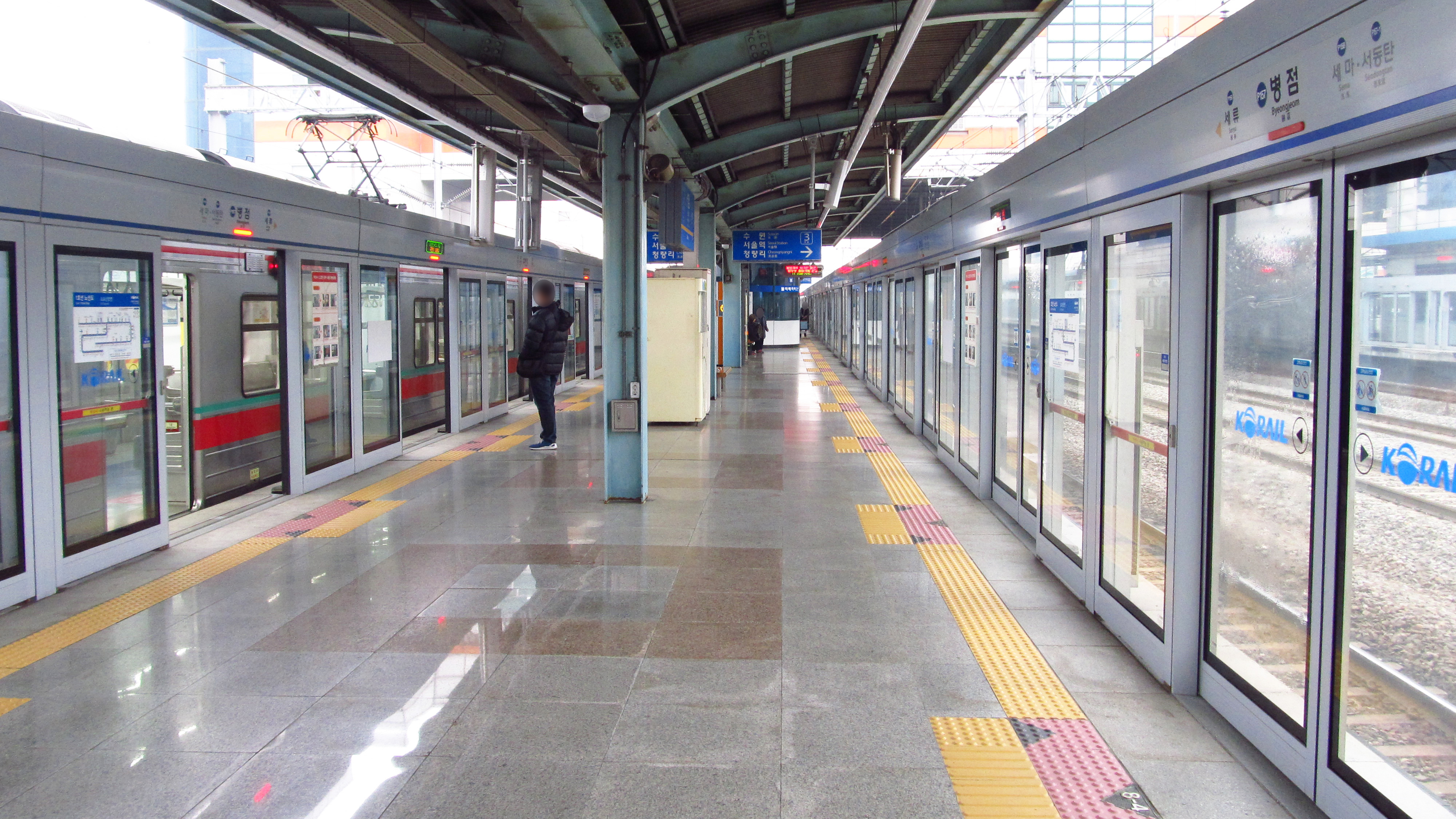
Station platforms
