= Mok-dong Line =

Railway line in Seoul, South Korea

Overview
- Native name: 서울 경전철 목동선 (木洞線)
- Status: Proposed
- Termini: Sinwol; Dangsan
- Stations: 12

History
- Planned opening: 2028

Technical
- Line length: 10.87 km (6.75 mi)

The Mok-dong Line (Korean: 목동선; Hanja: 木洞線) is a proposed light metro line scheduled to open in 2028, in Seoul, South Korea. In July 2024, the Ministry of Economy and Finance rejected the proposal on economic feasibility concerns. The Seoul Metropolitan Government intends to revise proposal to improve its economic return and resubmit at a later date.

== Stations ==
The names of the stations are not yet final.

Station Number	Station Name English	Station Name Hangul	Station Name Hanja	Transfer	Distance in km	Total Distance	Location	
S610	Sinwol	신월	新月				Seoul	Yangcheon-gu
S611	Sinwolsageori	신월사거리	新月四거리				Seoul	Yangcheon-gu
S612	West Seoul Lake Park	서서울호수공원	西서울湖水公園				Seoul	Yangcheon-gu
S613	Osolgilsilbeo Park	오솔길실버공원	오솔길실버公園				Seoul	Yangcheon-gu
S614	Gangsinjunggyo	강신중교	江信中校				Seoul	Yangcheon-gu
S615	Geumokjunggogyo	금옥중고교	金玉中高校				Seoul	Yangcheon-gu
S616	Sinteuri Park	신트리공원	신트리公園				Seoul	Yangcheon-gu
S617	Yangcheon-gu Office	양천구청	陽川區廳				Seoul	Yangcheon-gu
S618	Omokgyo (Mok-dong Stadium)	오목교 (목동운동장앞)	梧木橋 (木洞運動場앞)	Seoul Subway Line 5			Seoul	Yangcheon-gu
S619	SBS	SBS	SBS				Seoul	Yangcheon-gu
S620	Mokdong Sports Complex	목동종합운동장	木洞綜合運動場				Seoul	Yangcheon-gu
S621	Dangsan	당산	堂山	Seoul Subway Line 2 Seoul Subway Line 9			Seoul	Yeongdeungpo-gu
