= Myeonmok Line =

Railway line in Seoul, South Korea

Overview
- Native name: 서울 경전철 면목선 (面牧線)
- Status: Proposed
- Termini: Cheongnyangni; Sinnae
- Stations: 12

Service
- Depot(s): Sinnae Train Depot

History
- Planned opening: 2028

Technical
- Line length: 9.05 km (5.62 mi)

The Myeonmok Line (Korean: 면목선; Hanja: 面牧線) is a proposed future light metro line scheduled to open in 2028, in Seoul, South Korea.

== Stations ==
The names of the stations are not yet final.

Station Number	Station Name English	Station Name Hangul	Station Name Hanja	Transfer	Distance in km	Total Distance	Location	
S401	Cheongnyangni(Univ. of Seoul)	청량리 (서울시립대입구)	淸凉里	Mugunghwa-ho and ITX-Saemaeul services			Seoul	Dongdaemun-gu
S402	University of Seoul	서울시립대	서울市立大				Seoul	Dongdaemun-gu
S403	Jeonnongnoteori	전농로터리	典農로터리				Seoul	Dongdaemun-gu
S404	Jangandongsamgeori	장안동삼거리	長安洞三거리				Seoul	Dongdaemun-gu
S405	Myeonseo	면서	面西				Seoul	Jungnang-gu
S406	Myeonmok	면목	面牧	Seoul Subway Line 7			Seoul	Jungnang-gu
S407	Seoil University	서일대	瑞逸大				Seoul	Jungnang-gu
S408	Yongma Land	용마랜드	龍馬랜드				Seoul	Jungnang-gu
S409	Mangu	망우	忘憂				Seoul	Jungnang-gu
S410	Jungnang-gu Office	중랑구청	中浪區廳				Seoul	Jungnang-gu
S411	Neungsan	능산	陵山				Seoul	Jungnang-gu
S412	Sinnae	신내	新內	Gyeongchun Line			Seoul	Jungnang-gu
