= Wirye–Sinsa Line =

Subway line in Seoul, South Korea

Overview
- Native name: 서울 경전철 위례신사선 (慰禮新沙線)
- Status: Planned
- Termini: Wirye Centre; Sinsa
- Stations: 11

History
- Planned opening: 2033

Technical
- Line length: 14.7 km (9.1 mi)

The Wirye–Sinsa Line (Korean: 위례신사선; Hanja: 慰禮新沙線) is a future subway line scheduled to open in 2033, in Seoul, South Korea. Construction was scheduled to begin in 2021.

== Stations ==
The names of the stations are not yet final.

Station; Number	Station Name; English	Station Name; Hangul	Station Name; Hanja	Transfer	Distance in km	Total; Distance	Location	
S701	Wirye Jungang	위례중앙	慰禮中央				Seoul	Songpa-gu
S702	Sinmunjeong	신문정	新文井				Seoul	Songpa-gu
S703	Garak Market	가락시장	可樂市場	Seoul Subway Line 3 Seoul Subway Line 8			Seoul	Songpa-gu
S704	Tancheon	탄천	炭川				Seoul	Songpa-gu
S705	Hangnyeoul	학여울	鶴여울	Seoul Subway Line 3			Seoul	Gangnam-gu
S706	Samseong (World Trade Center Seoul)	삼성 (무역센터)	三成 (貿易센터)	Seoul Subway Line 2			Seoul	Gangnam-gu
S707	Bongeunsa	봉은사	奉恩寺	Seoul Subway Line 9			Seoul	Gangnam-gu
S708	Cheongdam (Korea Gold Exchange)	청담 (한국금거래소)	淸潭 (韓國金去來所)	Seoul Subway Line 7			Seoul	Gangnam-gu
S709	Dosan Park	도산공원	島山公園				Seoul	Gangnam-gu
S710	Eulji Hospital	을지병원	乙支病院				Seoul	Gangnam-gu
S711	Sinsa	신사	新沙	Shinbundang Line			Seoul	Gangnam-gu

Planned extension to Hanam by Hanam City

Station; Number	Station Name; English	Station Name; Hangul	Station Name; Hanja	Transfer	Distance in km	Total; Distance	Location	
	Wirye Hanam	위례하남	慰禮河南				Gyeonggi	Hanam
S701	Wirye Jungang	위례중앙	慰禮中央				Seoul	Songpa-gu
