= Gangbukhoengdan Line =

Future subway in Seoul, South Korea

Gangbukhoengdan line

Overview
- Native name: 서울 경전철 강북횡단선 (江北橫斷線); Gangbukhoengdanseon; Gangbuk crossing line
- Status: Planned
- Owner: Seoul Metropolitan Government
- Termini: Cheongnyangni; Mok-dong
- Stations: 19

History
- Planned opening: 2028

Technical
- Line length: 25.7 km (16.0 mi)

The Gangbukhoengdan line (Korean: 강북횡단선; Hanja: 江北橫斷線) is a proposed light metro line scheduled to open in 2028, in Seoul, South Korea. In June 2024, the Ministry of Economy and Finance rejected the proposal on economic feasibility concerns due to high cost and low population density along the line.

== Stations ==
The names of the stations are not yet final.

Station number	Station name			Transfer	Distance	Total distance	Location	
Station number	English	Hangul	Hanja	Transfer	Distance	Total distance	Location	
101	Cheongnyangni	청량리역	淸凉里	Mugunghwa-ho and ITX-Saemaeul services			Seoul	Dongdaemun-gu
102	Hongneung	홍릉	洪陵				Seoul	Dongdaemun-gu
103	Wolgok (Dongduk Women's University)	월곡 (동덕여대)	月谷 (同德女大)	Seoul Subway Line 6			Seoul	Seongbuk-gu
104	Jongamsageori	종암사거리	鍾岩四거리				Seoul	Seongbuk-gu
105	Gireum	길음	吉音	Seoul Subway Line 4			Seoul	Seongbuk-gu
106	Jeongneung	정릉	貞陵	Ui LRT			Seoul	Seongbuk-gu
107	Gungmindae	국민대	國民大				Seoul	Seongbuk-gu
108	Pyeongchang-dong	평창동	平倉洞				Seoul	Jongno-gu
109	Sangmyung University	상명대입구	祥明大入口				Seoul	Jongno-gu
110	Hongje	홍제	弘濟	Seoul Subway Line 3			Seoul	Seodaemun-gu
111	Seodaemun-gu Office	서대문구청	西大門區廳				Seoul	Seodaemun-gu
112	Myongji University	명지대	明知大				Seoul	Seodaemun-gu
113	Namgajwa	남가좌	南加佐				Seoul	Seodaemun-gu
114	Digital Media City	디지털미디어시티	디지털미디어시티	Gyeongui–Jungang Line			Seoul	Mapo-gu
115	Sangam	상암	上岩				Seoul	Mapo-gu
116	Deungchon	등촌	登村	Seoul Subway Line 9			Seoul	Gangseo-gu
117	Sindeungchon	신등촌	新登村				Seoul	Gangseo-gu
118	Mokdongsageori	목동사거리	木洞四거리				Seoul	Yangcheon-gu
119	Mok-dong	목동	木洞	Seoul Subway Line 5			Seoul	Yangcheon-gu
