= Tmoney =

Smartcard payment system in South Korea

Tmoney 티머니
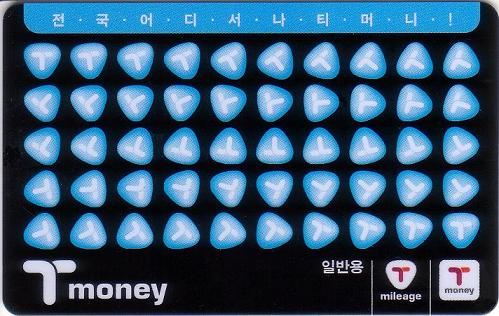
- Location: South Korea
- Launched: April 22 2004
- Technology: ISO/IEC 14443 Type A/B; KS X 6923/6924
- Operator: Tmoney Corporation
- Manager: Tmoney Corporation
- Currency: KRW (500,000 KRW maximum load)
- Credit expiry: None
- Auto recharge: available
- Validity: Rapid transit systems in Seoul Metropolitan Area, Busan, Daegu, Daejeon; Public transport bus systems in Seoul Metropolitan Area (excluding Baengnyeong Island), Daejeon, Sejong, South Chungcheong, Daegu, Busan, Ulsan, Jeju etc.; Taxis that have a card reader (Seoul Metropolitan Area, Daejeon, Busan, Daegu, Ulsan, Gwangju, Jeju etc.); many Convenience stores
- Retailed: Subway stations; convenience store and kiosk; Korea Post, Credit union, Hana Bank, Shinhan Bank(Jeju Bank), and Woori Bank, KB Financial Group Inc, Nonghyup Bank
- Variants: Tmoney Mpass; POP card
- Website: eng.tmoney.co.kr/en/aeb/main/main/readMain.dev

Tmoney (Korean: 티머니), formerly styled T-money, is a rechargeable series of smart cards and other "smart" devices used for paying transportation fares in South Korea. Tmoney can also be used in lieu of cash or credit cards in some convenience stores and other businesses. The Tmoney System has been implemented and is being operated by Tmoney Co., Ltd of which 34.4% owned by Seoul Metropolitan Government, 31.85% owned by LG CNS, and 15.73% owned by Credit Card Union.

== Usage ==
Similar to its predecessor, the "Seoul Bus Card", Tmoney can be used to pay for bus, subway and some taxi fares. As of June 2024, Tmoney is accepted by:

- All public transport buses nationwide
- All six Metropolitan Subway networks (Seoul, Incheon, Busan, Daegu, Daejeon, and Gwangju)
- AREX, U Line, EverLine, Shinbundang Line, Donghae Line (Metro) and Busan–Gimhae Light Rail Transit
- Korail ticket offices
- Toll booths operated by Korea Expressway Corporation

Additionally, shops and attractions including Seoul's four palaces (except Gyeonghuigung), Lotte World amusement park, Kyobo Book Centre, GS 25, CU/FamilyMart and other selected convenience stores accept Tmoney as payment method.

== Card types ==
=== Standard ===
Tmoney cards cost 3,000 – 5,000 won and can be purchased and recharged at metro stations, bank ATMs, convenience stores and kiosks located adjacent to bus stops. Self-service recharge machines are also available at Seoul and Busan metro stations.

In 2014, "One Card All Pass"-enabled Tmoney was introduced. It holds "One Card All Pass" logo, and bears slightly different card number system compared to generic Tmoney. As of March 2016, "One Card All Pass" Tmoney is accepted at major retailers, most express bus and some intercity bus routes, express road toll booths, Korail stations, all metro systems, and all bus systems except Gimhae.

=== Discount cards ===
There are two types of discount cards available for sale, one for teenagers (age 13-18) and the other for children (age 7-12). One needs a proper ID such as a Youth Card or Student ID in order to purchase these cards. Discount cards must be registered via the Internet within 10 days after first use. Registration requires the number on the card, and a National ID number or Foreigner Registration Number. Senior citizens are entitled to free transportation and can pick up free tickets at ticket machine in Seoul metropolitan subway stations with proper ID.

=== Tmoney accessories ===
Smaller, more durable Tmoney cards with a lanyard for easy attachment to cell phones are also available, for about 6,000~8,000 won.

=== Related cards ===
- Metro Pass (정기권), a monthly pass for the Seoul and Incheon subway systems available at stations.
- Tmoney Mpass, a one-day transportation card incorporating the Seoul City Tour Bus ticket and limited use of the metropolitan transportation system.
- Seoul Citypass Plus is a Tmoney with extra benefits at tourist spots.
- Mobile Tmoney is a RF-/NFC-Subscriber Identity Module based Tmoney service. Mobile Tmoney application is available on Google Play and each mobile service provider's ESD.

=== Other cards ===
- eB Card (eBest Card, used in Gyeonggi & Incheon province), now discontinued. → See cashBee.
- Sensepass Tmoney, previously Topcash Tmoney, sold in the Gyeongsangnam and Gyeongsangbuk Provinces except Andong. Not wholly compatible with Smart Tmoney.
- Hankkumi card, sold in Daejeon. This is a rebranded version of Smart Tmoney.
- POP card, sold in GS25. This is a rebranded Smart Tmoney with GS&Point and Happy Point loyalty card.
- Narasarang Card, issued by Shinhan Card·Shinhan Bank and NMD/MMA. This is a K-Cash enabled debit card with POP card functionality. This card is only issued to ROTC officers and ROK Armed Forces enlisted person including KATUSA.

== Company ==
Tmoney is operated by Tmoney Co., Ltd. The company was established in 2003 to run Seoul's smart-card fare system and was known as Korea Smart Card Co. before being renamed Tmoney in June 2019. Its largest shareholder is the Seoul Metropolitan Government, with LG CNS as the second-largest shareholder. In April 2025, the company spun off its mobility and VAN/PG operations into a subsidiary, Tmoney Mobility, in which Kakao Mobility acquired a 19.99% stake.

== See also ==
- RFID
