= Dongtan–Indeogwon Line =

Railway line in South Korea

Overview
- Native name: 동탄–인덕원 복선전철 (東灘–仁德院複線電鐵); Dongtan–Indeogwon Bokseonjeoncheol
- Status: Under construction
- Termini: Indeogwon; Dongtan
- Stations: 6–13

History
- Planned opening: December 2028

The Dongtan–Indeogwon Line (Korean: 동탄–인덕원 복선전철; Hanja: 東灘–仁德院複線電鐵, also formerly known as the Indeogwon–Suwon Line) is a double track subway line planned to open in December 2028.

== Stations ==
The following list of stations may be subject to change as the line is constructed and various sources give conflicting information.

Station Number	Station Name English	Station Name Hangul	Station Name Hanja	Transfer	Distance in km	Total Distance	Location
	Indeogwon	인덕원	仁德院	Seoul Subway Line 4	-	0.0	
	Naeson	내손	內蓀				
	Ojeon	오전	五全				
	Suwon Baseball Stadium	수원야구장	水原野球場				
	Gyeonggi Provincial Government	경기도청	京畿道廳	Shinbundang Line Everline			
	Woncheon	원천	遠川				
	Yeongtong	영통	靈通	Suin–Bundang Line			
	Seocheon	서천	書川				
	Banwol	반월	半月				
	Neung-dong	능동	陵洞				
	Bansong	반송	盤松				
	Dongtan	동탄	東灘	GTX-A			

== Literature ==
- The History of Korean Railway by Photographs: KOTI Knowledge Sharing Report. The Korea Transport Institute (South Korea). ISBN 895503654X.
