= ITX-Maum =

Class of passenger train service in South Korea

Overview
- Service type: Inter-city rail (Higher-speed rail)
- Status: Operating
- Locale: South Korea
- Predecessor: Mugunghwa-ho
- First service: September 1, 2023
- Current operator: Korail

Technical
- Rolling stock: Korail Class 220000
- Track gauge: 1,435 mm (4 ft 8 1/2 in) standard gauge
- Operating speed: 150 km/h (95 mph)

The Intercity Train eXpress-Maum (ITX-Maum; Korean: ITX-마음) is a semi-high-speed train of Korail, South Korea's national railway operator. It was introduced to replace Mugunghwa-ho and has the same class as ITX-Saemaeul. It began operation on the Gyeongbu Line, Honam Line, Jeolla Line, Jungang Line, Donghae Line, Yeongdong Line, Taebaek Line, and Daegu Line in September 2023. The Korail Class 220000 rolling stock used on the ITX-Maum was manufactured by Dawonsys.

== History ==
A public contest for train names was held in 2022, and a total of 8,175 candidates were submitted. In August 2023, the train name was decided as ITX-Maum. Minister of Land, Infrastructure and Transport Won Hee-ryong explained, "We named it ITX-Maum with the hope that starting with this Taebaek Line, it will connect the Korean Peninsula and beyond Eurasia."

In September 2023, the Gyeongbu Line, Honam Line, Jeolla Line, and Taebaek Line began operation. In December 2024, the operation of the Jungang Line Cheongnyangni-Bujeon section (433 km (269 mi)) began.

=== Stops ===
==== Stations served ====
Gyeongbu Line: Seoul, Yeongdeungpo, Suwon, Seojeong-ri, Pyeongtaek, Seonghwan, Cheonan, Jochiwon, Bugang, Sintanjin, Daejeon, Okcheon, Iwon, Jitan, Yeongdong, Hwanggan, Chupungnyeong, Gimcheon, Gumi, Waegwan, Daegu, Dongdaegu, Gyeongsan, Namseonghyeon, Cheongdo, Sangdong, Miryang, Samnangjin, Wondong, Mulgeum, Hwamyeong, Gupo, Sasang, Busan

Gyeongjeon Line: Dongdaegu, Gyeongsan, Namseonghyeon, Cheongdo, Sangdong, Miryang, Hallimjeong, Jinyeong, Jillye, Changwonjungang, Changwon, Masan, Jung-ri, Haman, Gunbuk, Banseong, Jinju

Honam Line: Yongsan, Yeongdeungpo, Suwon, Pyeongtaek, Cheonan, Jochiwon, Seodaejeon, Nonsan, Iksan, Gimje, Sintaein, Jeongeup, Baegyangsa, Jangseong, GwangjuSongjeong, Naju, Dasi, Hampyeong, Muan, Mongtan, Illo, Mokpo

Gwangju Line: Iksan, Gimje, Sintaein, Jeongeup, Jangseong, Gwangju

Jeolla Line: Yongsan, Yeongdeungpo, Suwon, Pyeongtaek, Cheonan, Jochiwon, Sintanjin, Seodaejeon, Nonsan, Iksan, Jeonju, Namwon, Gokseong, Guryegu, Suncheon, Yeocheon, Yeosu-Expo

Taebaek Line: Cheongnyangni, Wonju, Jecheon, Yeongwol, Mindungsan, Sabuk, Taebaek, Dogye, Donghae

Jungang Line: Cheongnyangni, Deokso, Yangpyeong, Yongmun, Yangdong, Seowonju, Wonju, Jecheon, Danyang, Punggi, Yeongju, Andong, Uiseong, Gunwi, Yeongcheon, Ahwa, Gyeongju, Bugulsan, Taehwagang, Namchang, Gijang, Sinhaeundae, Centum, Bujeon

Donghae Line: Dongdaegu, Hayang, Yeongcheon, Gyeongju, Bugulsan, Taehwagang, Namchang, Gijang, Sinhaeundae, Centum, Bujeon / Gangneung, Jeongdongjin, Mukho, Donghae, Chuam, Samcheok Haebyeon, Samcheok, Geundeok, Imwon, Okwon, Heungbu, Jukbyeon, Uljin, Maehwa, Giseong, Pyeonghae, Hupo, Goraebul, Yeonghae, Yeongdeok, Wolpo, Pohang, Seogyeongju, Gyeongju, Bugulsan, Taehwagang, Namchang, Gijang, Sinhaeundae, Centum, Bujeon / Gangneung, Jeongdongjin, Mukho, Donghae, Samcheok Haebyeon, Samcheok, Heungbu, Uljin, Giseong, Hupo, Goraebul, Yeonghae, Yeongdeok, Wolpo, Pohang, Seogyeongju, Yeongcheon, Hayang, Dongdaegu

Seohae Line: Seohwaseong, Hwaseong City Hall, Hyangnam, Anjung, Inju, Hapdeok, Hongseong

Janghang Line: Yongsan, Yeongdeungpo, Anyang, Suwon, Pyeongtaek, Cheonan, Asan, Onyangoncheon, Sinchang, Sillyewon, Yesan, Hongseong

Pyeongtaek Line (circular): Hongseong, Sapgyo, Yesan, Sillyewon, Onyangoncheon, Asan, Cheonan, Pyeongtaek, Anjung, Inju, Hapdeok, Hongseong

Chungbuk Line: Jecheon, Chungju, Judeok, Eumseong, Jeungpyeong, Cheongju Int'l Airport, Ogeunjang, Cheongju, Osong, Jochiwon, Sintanjin, Seodaejeon, Gyeryong, Nonsan, Ganggyeong, Iksan, Gimje, Jeongeup, Geungnakgang, Gwangju / Jecheon, Chungju, Judeok, Eumseong, Jeungpyeong, Cheongju Int'l Airport, Ogeunjang, Cheongju, Osong, Jochiwon, Sintanjin, Seodaejeon, Gyeryong, Nonsan, Iksan, Jeonju, Namwon, Gokseong, Guryegu, Suncheon, Yeocheon, Yeosu-Expo / Daejeon, Jochiwon, Osong, Cheongju, Ogeunjang, Cheongju Int'l Airport, Jeungpyeong, Eumseong, Chungju, Jecheon

== Rolling stock ==
ITX-Maum awaiting a signal change at Seoul

The rolling stock is a multiple unit Korail Class 220000 manufactured by Dawonsys. The exterior is designed with a smooth streamlined shape that takes wind resistance into account, and the color combination is red and black. Each four-car sets has seats for 264 passengers while six-car sets provide seats for up to 392.

Interior amenities include in-car wireless internet, power outlets and USB ports for each seat, reading lights, and reclining seats. The door step can be adjusted according to the platform height.
