= Bugang station =

Train station in South Korea

Coordinates: 36°31′56″N 127°21′55″E

부강
Bugang
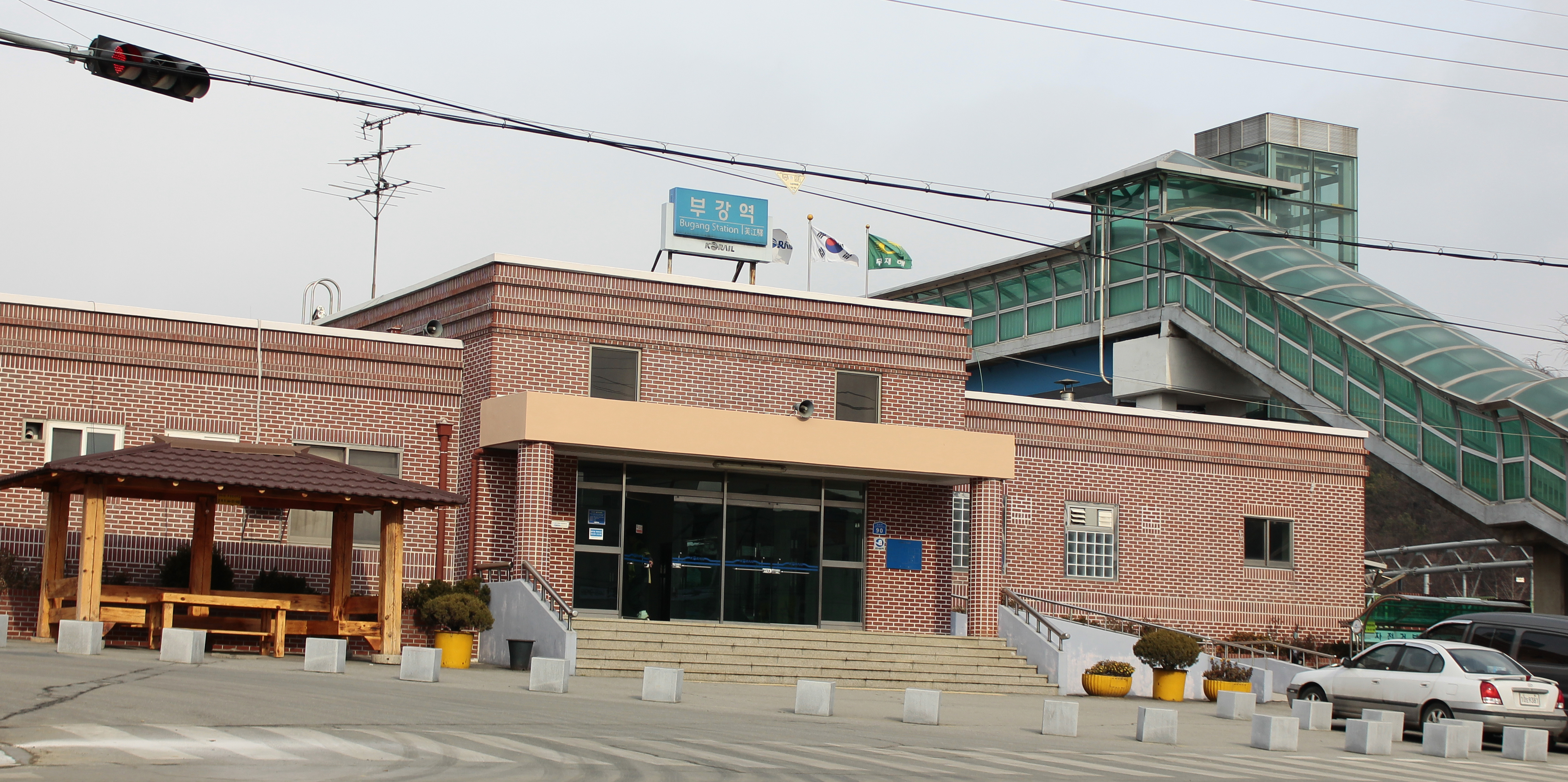

Korean name
- Hangul: 부강역
- Hanja: 芙江驛
- Revised Romanization: Bugang-yeok
- McCune–Reischauer: Pugang-yŏk

General information
- Operator: Korail
- Platforms: 0
- Tracks: 0

Services
Preceding station	Korail	Following station
Jochiwon towards Seoul	ITX-Saemaeul Gyeongbu Line	Sintanjin towards Busan
Jochiwon towards Seoul	ITX-Maum Gyeongbu Line	Sintanjin towards Busan
Jochiwon towards Seoul	Mugunghwa-ho Gyeongbu Line	Sintanjin towards Busan
Jochiwon towards Yongsan	Mugunghwa-ho Honam Line	Sintanjin towards Gwangju
Sintanjin towards Daejeon or Dongdaegu	Mugunghwa-ho Chungbuk Line	Jochiwon towards Jecheon or Yeongju
Jochiwon towards Yongsan	Mugunghwa-ho Jeolla Line	Sintanjin towards Yeosu-Expo
Location

Bugang station is a railway station on the Gyeongbu Line in Bugang-myeon, Sejong City, Republic of Korea.

Construction of a new road connecting Bugang Station on the Gyeongbu Line and the Bukdaejeon Interchange (IC) in Sejong Special Self-Governing City will begin in 2027.
