= Sintanjin station =

Train station in South Korea

Coordinates: 36°26′56.77″N 127°25′42.25″E

신탄진
Sintanjin
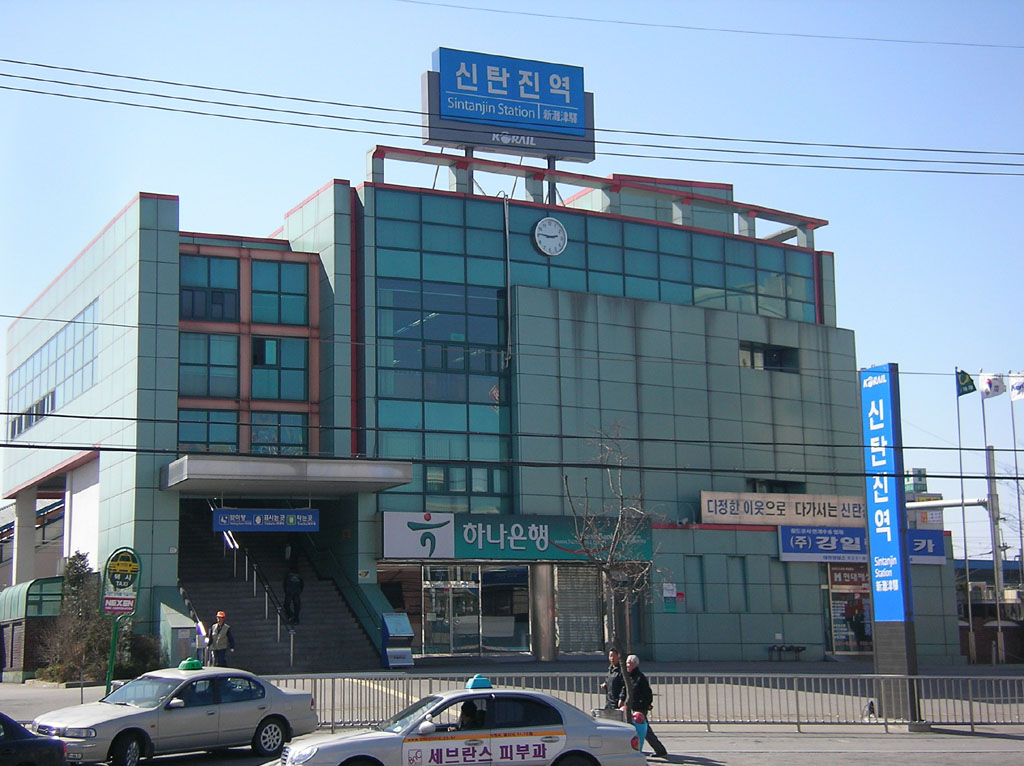

Korean name
- Hangul: 신탄진역
- Hanja: 新灘津驛
- Revised Romanization: Sintanjin-yeok
- McCune–Reischauer: Sint'anjin-yŏk

General information
- Platforms: 0
- Tracks: 0

Services
Preceding station	Korail	Following station
Bugang towards Seoul	ITX-Saemaeul Gyeongbu Line	Daejeon towards Busan
Jochiwon towards Yongsan	ITX-Saemaeul Gwangju Line	Seodaejeon towards Gwangju
Jochiwon towards Yongsan	ITX-Saemaeul Jeolla Line	Seodaejeon towards Yeosu-Expo
Bugang towards Seoul	ITX-Maum Gyeongbu Line	Daejeon towards Busan
Jochiwon towards Yongsan	ITX-Maum Jeolla Line	Seodaejeon towards Yeosu-Expo
Jochiwon towards Jecheon	ITX-Maum Chungbuk Line	Seodaejeon towards Gwangju or Yeosu-Expo
Bugang towards Seoul	Mugunghwa-ho Gyeongbu Line	Daejeon towards Busan
Jochiwon towards Yongsan	Mugunghwa-ho Honam Line	Seodaejeon towards Mokpo
Bugang towards Yongsan	Mugunghwa-ho Honam Line	Seodaejeon towards Gwangju
Daejeon Terminus	Mugunghwa-ho Chungbuk Line	Bugang towards Jecheon
Daejeon towards Dongdaegu	Mugunghwa-ho Chungbuk Line	Bugang towards Yeongju
Bugang towards Yongsan	Mugunghwa-ho Jeolla Line	Seodaejeon towards Yeosu-Expo
Location

Sintanjin station is a railway station on the Gyeongbu Line in South Korea.
