= Mugunghwa-ho =

Class of passenger train service in South Korea

- A Mugunghwa-ho train being hauled by an electric locomotive passing Guro station

Overview
- Service type: Regional rail
- Status: Operating
- Locale: South Korea
- First service: January 1, 1984
- Successor: ITX-Maum
- Current operator: Korail

Route
- Distance travelled: Up to 8 hours

On-board services
- Seating arrangements: Economy Class (2+2)
- Catering facilities: Minicafe Vending Machine (on some trains only)

Technical
- Rolling stock: Various carriage configurations including regular cars built between 1998 and 2004 and older cars built in the late 1980s~1990s: Korail Class 8200; Korail Class 7300
- Track gauge: 1,435 mm (4 ft 8 1/2 in) standard gauge

- Mugunghwa-ho
- Hangul: 무궁화호
- Hanja: 無窮花號
- RR: Mugunghwaho
- MR: Mugunghwaho

The Mugunghwa-ho (Korean: 무궁화호) is a class of train operated by Korail, the main railway operator of South Korea. Mugunghwa trains are Korail's slowest tier of trains stopping at a number of towns and villages, and operating over a number of lines that are not served by other trains. Journey times are generally twice that of KTX trains and 25% longer than ITX express trains.

Along rural lines such as the Gyeongbuk Line, The Mugunghwa-ho remains the only class of passenger train operating. They are the only trains to stop at many stations not served by Saemaeul-ho or KTX trains.

Mugunghwa trains are built to accommodate large numbers of standing passengers, and frequently have many more standees than sitting passengers during high season.

== History ==
In 1980, new express train, named Udeung (우등, literally meaning Premium), was introduced. It was renamed Mugunghwa-ho, which was the name of an express train formerly operating in the 1960s. Today, all long-distance train classes that were formerly below Mugunghwa have been retired, thus Mugunghwa trains are now the cheapest class of trains to operate cross-country.

The Mugunghwa-ho takes its name from the hibiscus syriacus, the national flower of South Korea.

It is scheduled to be replaced by ITX-Maum in the future.

== Carriages and equipment ==
- Passenger car: Due to the number of services operating a variety of carriages are used on Mugunghwa-ho trains, including:
  - Long-length Mugunghwa-ho passenger carriages
  - Streamlined Mugunghwa-ho passenger carriages
  - Ex. Saemaeul-ho carriages (Retired May 2024)
  - Some Mugunghwa-ho trains contain old cafe cars which have been refurbished as subway style high-density non-reserved carriages.
- Multiple units
  - Refurbished Diesel Car (RDC): Former Commuter Diesel Car (CDC) (Retired December 2023)
  - New Diesel Car (Retired in 2010)
  - Diesel Excellent Car (Retired in 2001)

== Gallery ==
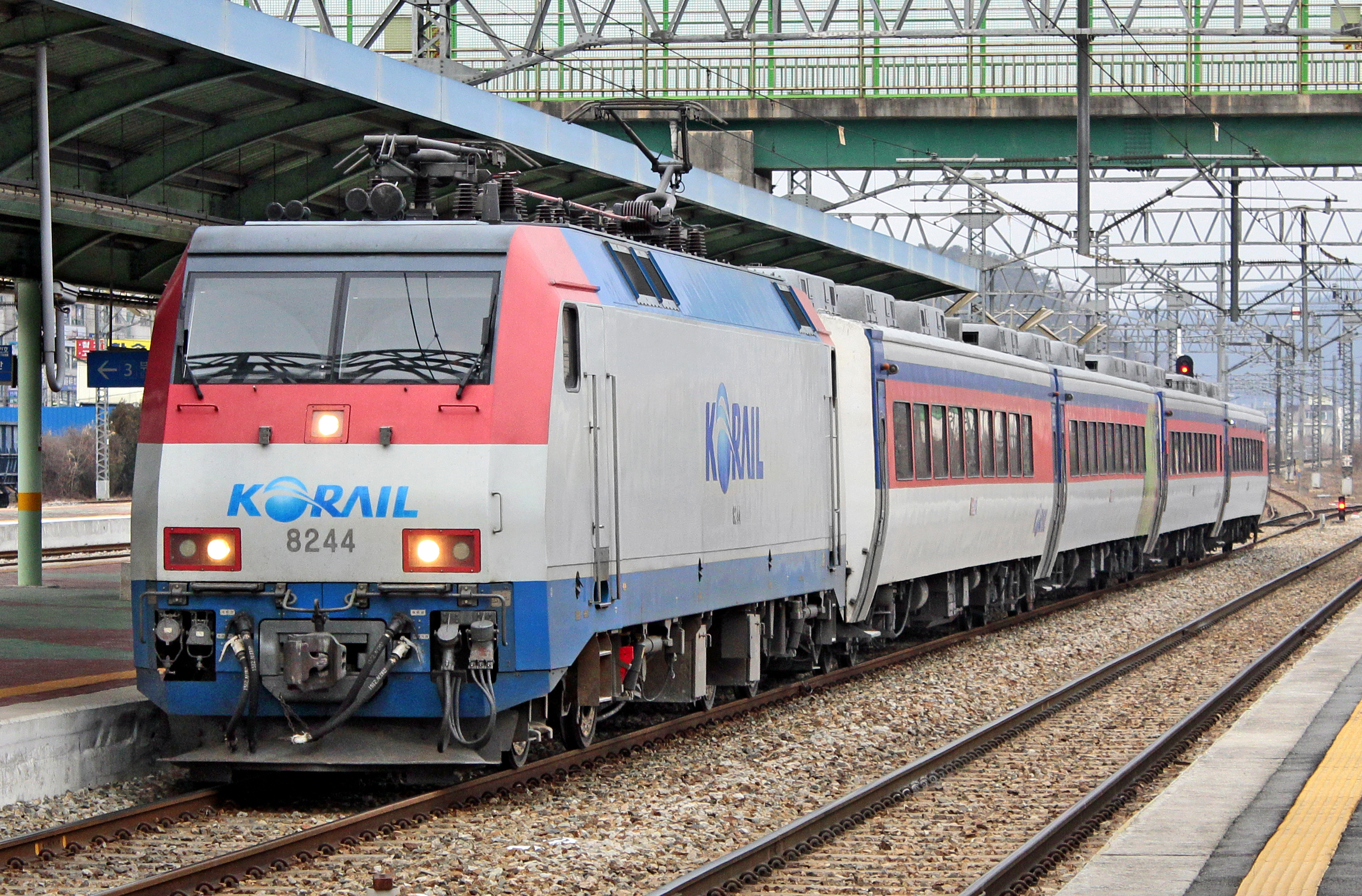
Chungbuk Line Mugunghwa Train pulled by electric locomotive.

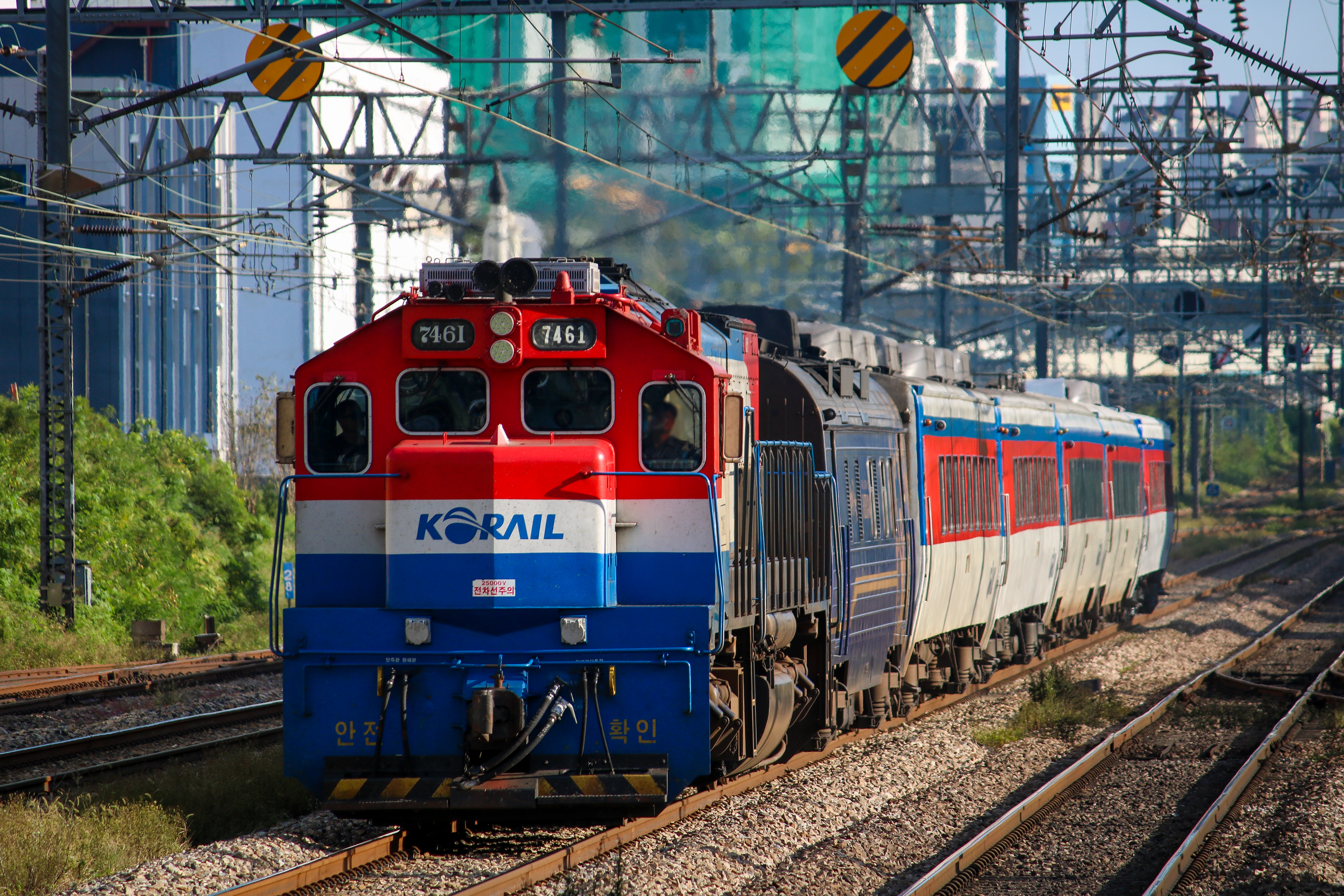
Mugunghwa train pulled by a diesel locomotive.

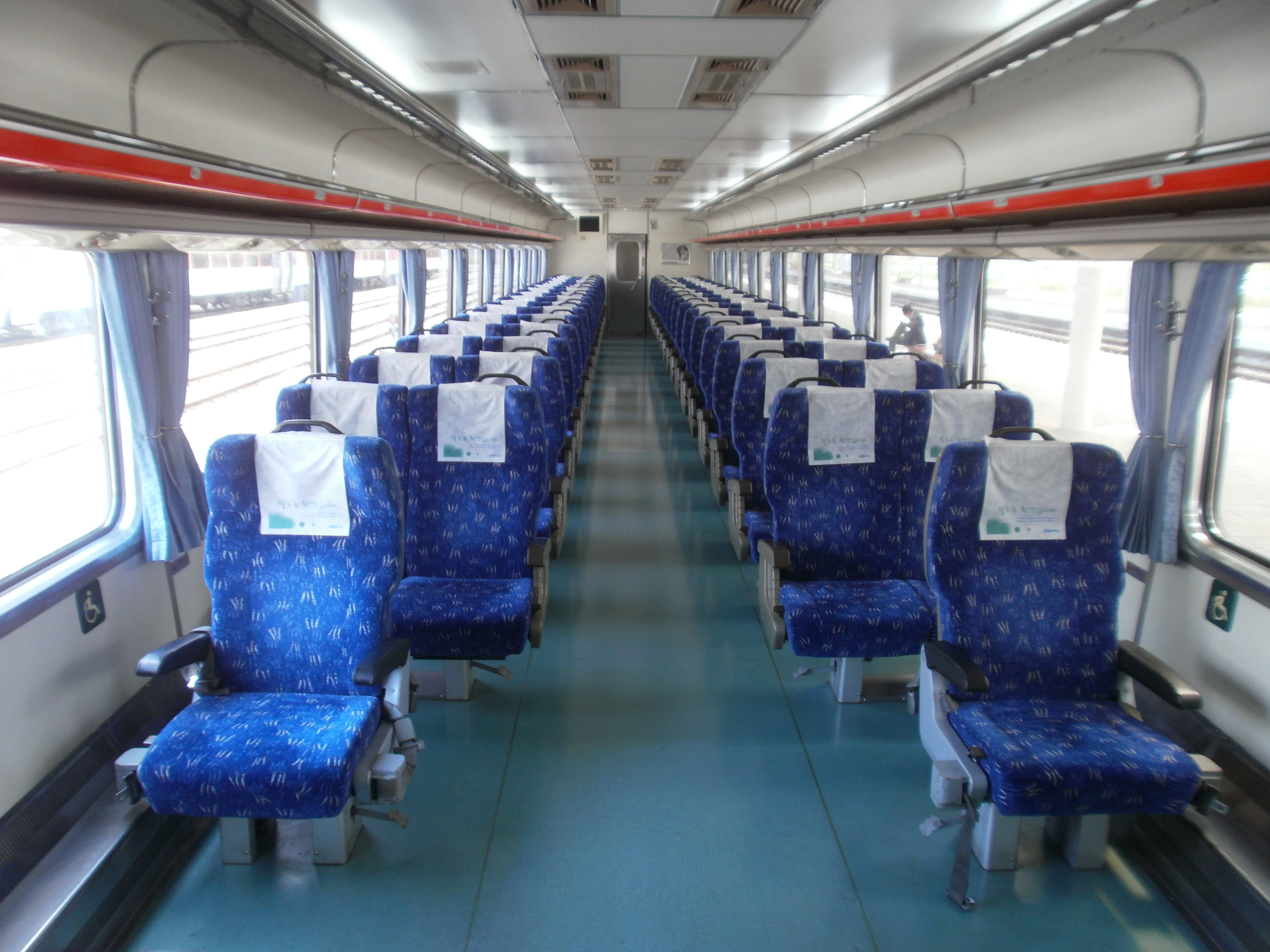
Interior of a renewed Mugunghwa carriage with space for disabled passengers.

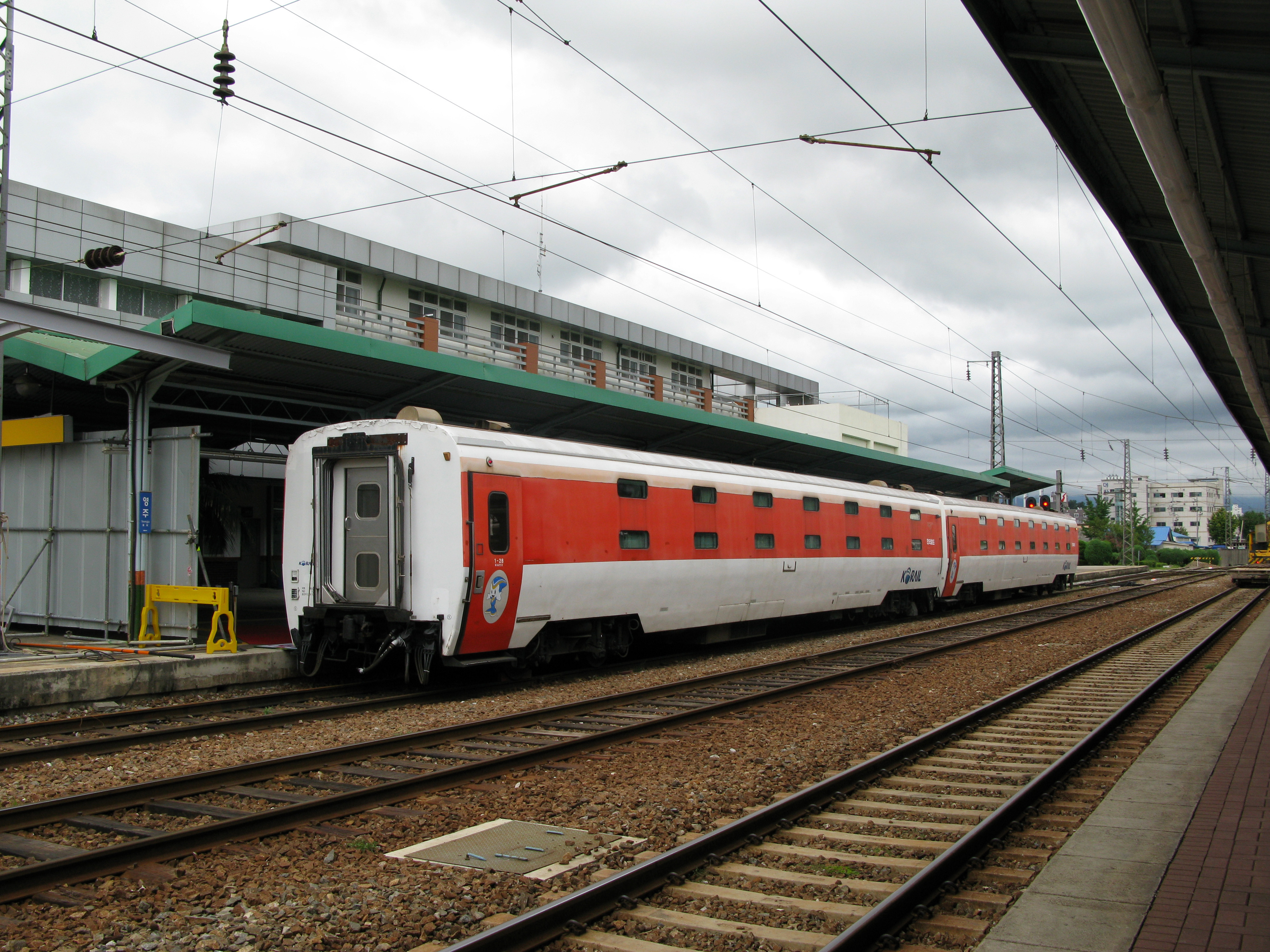
A classic Mugunghwa sleeper car, no longer used due to safety concerns.

== Services ==
Since the retirement of Tongil-ho and Bidulgi-ho services, some of those trains are upgraded to Mugunghwa-ho trains, although they rather stop more stations. Although some of stations are closed from the retirements, stops of Mugunghwa-ho vary for each train. Listed below are lines & stops which are served by Mugunghwa-ho trains:

Gyeongbu Line: Seoul, Yongsan, Yeongdeungpo, Anyang, Suwon, Osan, Seojeong-ri, Pyeongtaek, Seonghwan, Cheonan, Jeonui, Jochiwon, Bugang, Sintanjin, Daejeon, Okcheon, Iwon, Jitan, Simcheon, Gakgye, Yeongdong, Hwanggan, Chupungnyeong, Gimcheon, Gumi, Yangmok, Waegwan, Sindong, Daegu, Dongdaegu, Gyeongsan, Namseonghyeon, Cheongdo, Sangdong, Miryang, Samnangjin, Wondong, Mulgeum, Hwamyheong, Gupo, Sasang, Busan

Honam Line: Seodaejeon, Gyeryong, Yeonsan, Nonsan, Ganggyeong, Hamyeol, Iksan, Gimje, Jeongeup, Baegyangsa, Jangseong, GwangjuSongjeong, Naju, Dasi, Hampyeong, Muan, Mongtan, Illo, Imseong-ri, Mokpo

Jeolla Line: Iksan, Samnye, Jeonju, Imsil, Osu, Namwon, Gokseong, Guryegu, Suncheon, Yeocheon, Yeosu-Expo

Chungbuk Line: Dongdaegu, Daejeon, Sintanjin, Jochiwon, Osong, Cheongju, Ogeunjang, Cheongju Int'l Airport, Jeungpyeong, Eumseong, Judeok, Chungju, Samtan, Bongyang, Jecheon

Gyeongjeon Line: Samnangjin, Hallimjeong, Jinyeong, Jillye, Changwonjungang, Changwon, Masan, Jung-ri, Haman, Gunbuk, Banseong, Jinju, Wansa, Bukcheon, Hoengcheon, Hadong, Jinsang, Gwangyang, Suncheon, Beolgyo, Joseong, Yedang, Deungnyang, Boseong, Myeongbong, Iyang, Neungju, Hyocheon, Seogwangju, GwangjuSongjeong

Yeongdong Line: Yeongju, Bonghwa, Chunyang, Imgi, Hyeondong, Buncheon, Yangwon, Seungbu, Seokpo, Cheoram, Dongbaeksan, Dogye, Singi, Donghae

Taebaek Line: Jecheon, Ssangnyong, Yeongwol, Yemi, Mindungsan, Sabuk, Gohan, Taebaek, Dongbaeksan

Janghang Line: Cheonan, Asan, Onyangoncheon, Dogooncheon, Sillyewon, Yesan, Sapgyo, Hongseong, Gwangcheon, Cheongso, Daecheon, Ungcheon, Pangyo, Seocheon, Janghang, Gunsan, Daeya, Iksan

Donghae Line: Bujeon, Centum, Sinhaeundae, Gijang, Namchang, Taehwagang, Bugulsan, Gyeongju, Seogyeongju, Angang, Pohang

Gyeongbuk Line: Gimcheon, Oksan, Cheongni, Sangju, Hamchang, Jeomchon, Yonggung, Gaepo, Yecheon, Yeongju

Gwangju Line: GwangjuSongjeong, Geungnakgang, Gwangju

Daegu Line: Dongdaegu, Hayang, Yeongcheon

Gyooe Line: Daegok, Wolleung, Iryeong, Jangheung, Songchu, Uijeongbu

Mokpo–Boseong Line: Suncheon, Beolgyo, Joseong, Yedang, Deungnyang, Sinboseong, Jangdong, JeonnamJangheung, Gangjin, Haenam, Yeongam, Imseong-ri

Jungang Line: Cheongnyangni, Deokso, Yangpyeong, Yongmun, Jipyeong, Seokbul, Ilsin, Maegok, Yangdong, Samsan, Seowonju, Wonju, Bongyang, Jecheon, Danyang, Punggi, Yeongju, Andong, Uiseong, Gunwi

== Incidents ==
- On March 28, 1993, a Mugunghwa-ho train in the vicinity of Gupo station in Busan rolled over due to the collapse of a section of track caused by unauthorized tunneling below the track by the Samsung Engineering & Construction company. The derailment killed 78 people and 198 more were injured, making it the worst rail crash in the history of South Korea.
- On April 22, 2016, a Mugunghwa-ho 9-car train which departed Yongsan station at around 10:45 p.m., and headed for Yeosu Expo station on the Jeolla Line, was derailed at 3:41 a.m. on a curved track intersection while approaching Yulchon station. Five out of nine cars were derailed, and two toppled down, damaging parts of the railway electrification system. The engine car toppled away from the tracks, one engine driver was killed, seven passengers were injured and a secondary engine driver was injured. Twenty-three people were known to be onboard the train. Upon derailment, it is known that the train crashed into an unknown object. According to Korail engineers, the locomotive was operating at 127 km/h on the curved railway intersection. As the train was approaching a platform, it was designated to operate under 50 km/h when approaching stations. After further analysis on the train's data and voice recorders, the crash appeared to have been caused by the engine driver. Legal measures were to be taken on the two engine drivers. The remaining four cars were moved away from the tracks, and the destroyed rail electrification pylons were recovered in 25 hours.

== See also ==
- Rail transport in South Korea
- Transportation in South Korea
