= Jochiwon station =

Train station in Sejong City, South Korea

Coordinates: 36°36′15.61″N 127°17′43.54″E

조치원
Jochiwon
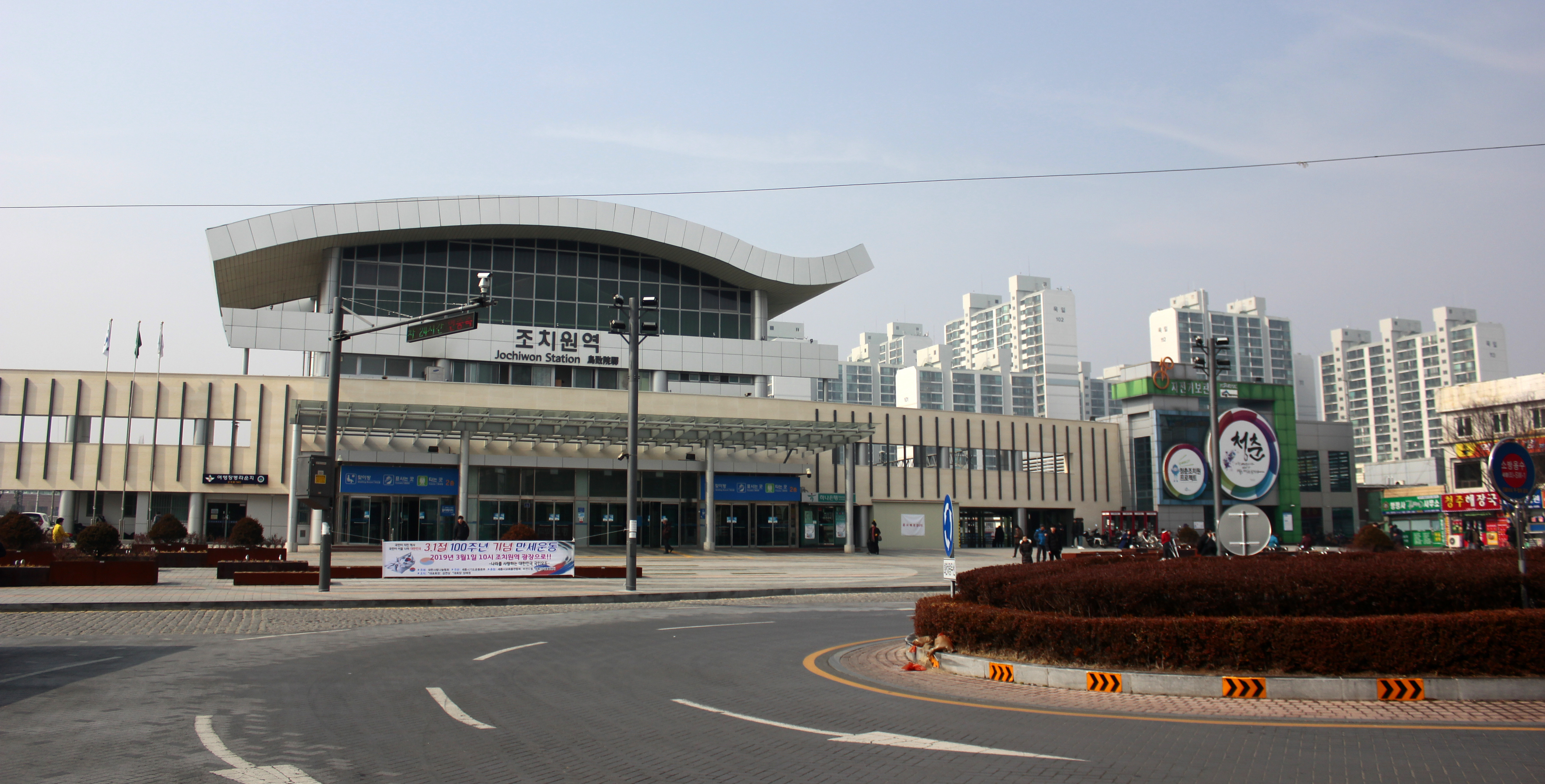

Korean name
- Hangul: 조치원역
- Hanja: 鳥致院驛
- Revised Romanization: Jochiwon-yeok
- McCune–Reischauer: Choch'iwŏn-yŏk

General information
- Platforms: 2-3
- Tracks: 6

Passengers
- (Daily) Based on January–June 2011. KR: 10,243

Services
Preceding station	Korail	Following station
Cheonan towards Seoul	ITX-Saemaeul Gyeongbu Line	Bugang towards Busan
Cheonan towards Seoul	ITX-Saemaeul Gyeongjeon Line	Daejeon towards Jinju
Cheonan towards Yongsan	ITX-Saemaeul Honam Line	Seodaejeon towards Mokpo
Cheonan towards Yongsan	ITX-Saemaeul Gwangju Line	Sintanjin towards Gwangju
Cheonan towards Yongsan	ITX-Saemaeul Jeolla Line	Sintanjin towards Yeosu-Expo
Cheonan towards Seoul	ITX-Maum Gyeongbu Line	Bugang towards Busan
Cheonan towards Yongsan	ITX-Maum Honam Line	Seodaejeon towards Mokpo
Cheonan towards Yongsan	ITX-Maum Jeolla Line	Sintanjin towards Yeosu-Expo
Osong towards Jecheon	ITX-Maum Chungbuk Line	Daejeon Terminus
Osong towards Jecheon	ITX-Maum Chungbuk Line	Sintanjin towards Gwangju or Yeosu-Expo
Jeonui towards Seoul	Mugunghwa-ho Gyeongbu Line	Bugang towards Busan
Jeonui towards Yongsan	Mugunghwa-ho Honam Line	Sintanjin towards Mokpo
Cheonan towards Yongsan	Mugunghwa-ho Honam Line	Bugang towards Gwangju
Bugang towards Daejeon or Dongdaegu	Mugunghwa-ho Chungbuk Line	Osong towards Jecheon or Yeongju
Jeonui towards Yongsan	Mugunghwa-ho Jeolla Line	Bugang towards Yeosu-Expo
Location

Jochiwon station is a railway station in Jochiwon-eup, Sejong City, South Korea.

== Station ==
It serves two railway lines: the Gyeongbu Line and the Chungbuk Line. There are three platforms for five tracks and a container yard for freight trains.

All Mugunghwa-ho trains and most of the ITX-Saemaeul trains stop here.
