= Namseonghyeon station =

Train station in South Korea

남성현
Namseonghyeon
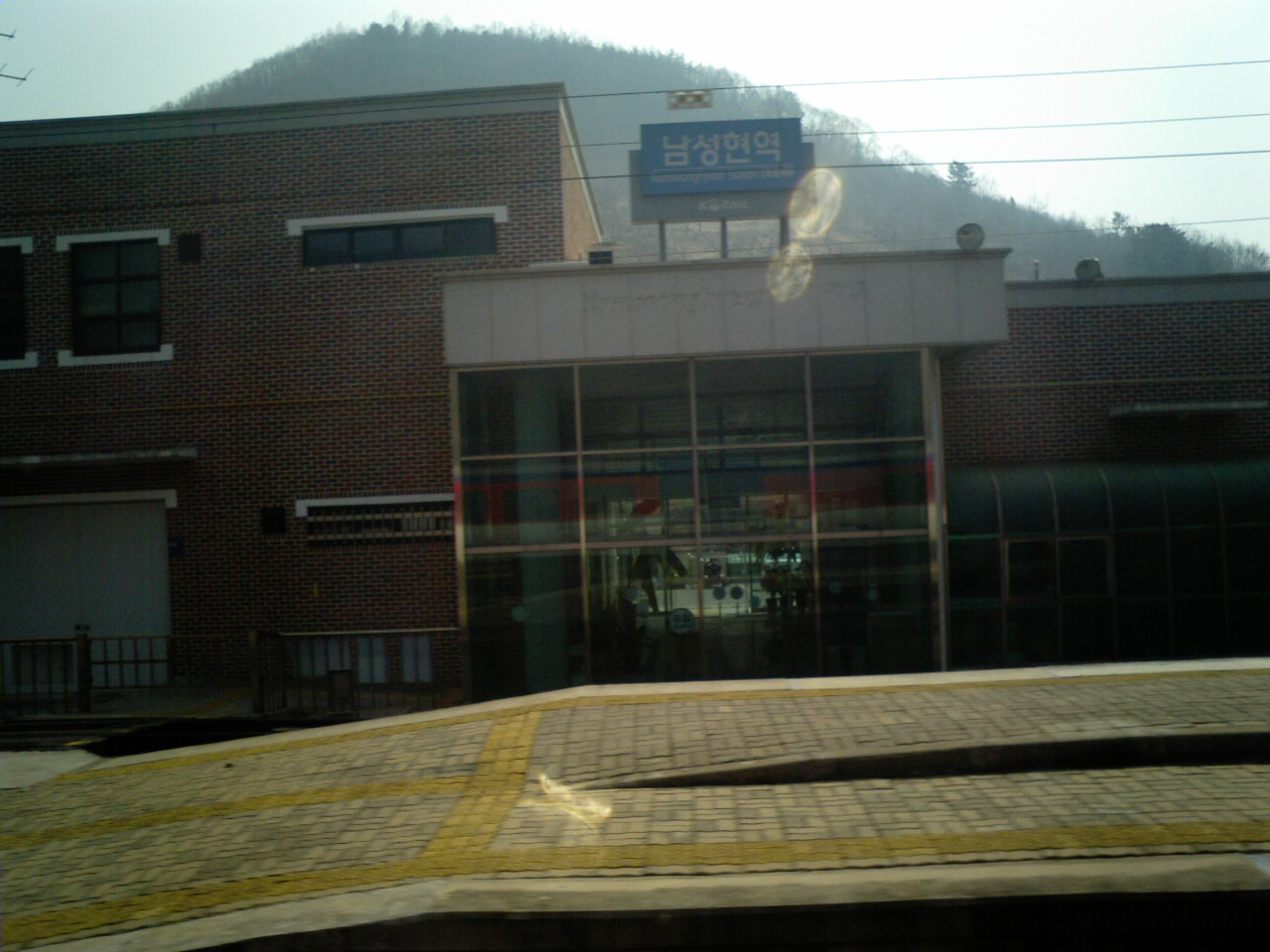

Korean name
- Hangul: 남성현역
- Hanja: 南省峴驛
- Revised Romanization: Namseonghyeonnyeok
- McCune–Reischauer: Namsŏnghyŏnnyŏk

General information
- Location: Daro-ri, Hwayang-eup, Cheongdo-gun, North Gyeongsang; South Korea
- Coordinates: 35°42′19″N 128°43′01″E
- Operator: Korail
- Line: Gyeongbu Line
- Platforms: 2
- Tracks: 4

Construction
- Structure type: Aboveground

History
- Opened: August 1, 1919

Services
Preceding station	Korail	Following station
Gyeongsan towards Dongdaegu	ITX-Saemaeul Gyeongbu Line	Cheongdo towards Busan
Gyeongsan towards Dongdaegu	ITX-Maum Gyeongbu Line	Cheongdo towards Busan
Gyeongsan towards Dongdaegu	ITX-Maum Gyeongjeon Line	Cheongdo towards Jinju
Gyeongsan towards Daejeon or Seoul	Mugunghwa-ho Gyeongbu Line	Cheongdo towards Busan
Gyeongsan towards Dongdaegu	Mugunghwa-ho Gyeongjeon Line	Cheongdo towards Jinju
Location

Namseonghyeon station is a railway station on the Gyeongbu Line in South Korea.
