= Korail Class 210000 =

South Korean train

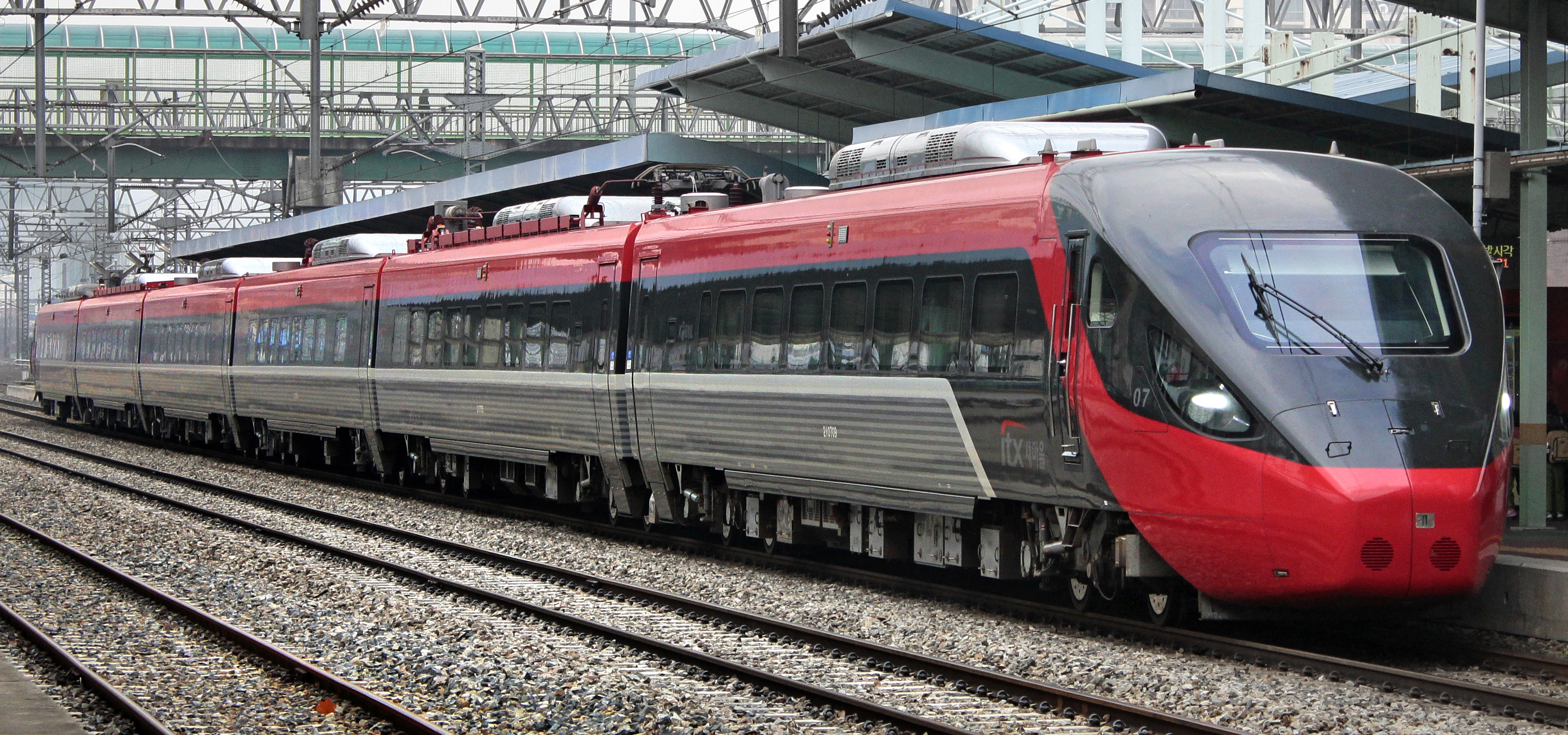
- Korail Class 210000 at Jochiwon Station
- Manufacturer: Hyundai Rotem
- Built at: Changwon, South Korea
- Constructed: 2013-2014
- Entered service: 2014
- Number built: 138 vehicles (23 sets)
- Number in service: 138 vehicles (23 sets)
- Formation: 6 cars per trainset TC-MC-MC-TC-MC-TC: TC – trailer car; MC – motored (powered) car
- Fleet numbers: 01-23
- Capacity: 376 passengers
- Operator: Korail
- Lines served: Donghae Line; Gyeongbu Line; Gyeongjeon Line; Honam Line; Jeolla Line; Jungang Line; Taebaek Line

Specifications
- Car body construction: Aluminium
- Train length: 143.0 m (469 ft 1 15/16 in)
- Car length: End cars: 24.255 m (79 ft 6 15/16 in); Intermediate cars: 23.0 m (75 ft 5 1/2 in)
- Width: 3.15 m (10 ft 4 in)
- Height: 3.82 m (12 ft 6 3/8 in)
- Doors: 2 per car, 1 per side
- Maximum speed: Service: 150 km/h (95 mph); Design: 165 km/h (105 mph)
- Weight: 267 t (263 long tons; 294 short tons)
- Traction system: IGBT-VVVF
- Traction motors: Three-phase AC induction motor
- Deceleration: from 150 to 0 km/h (93 to 0 mph) in 900 m (0.6 mi)
- Power supply: Overhead catenary
- Electric system: 25 kV/60 Hz AC
- Current collection: Pantograph
- Braking systems: Regenerative, air
- Safety systems: ATS, ATP (Ansaldo)
- Track gauge: 1,435 mm (4 ft 8 1/2 in) standard gauge

The Korail Class 210000, also known as the EMU-150, is a South Korean higher-speed electrical multiple unit train manufactured by Hyundai Rotem and operated by Korail on ITX-Saemaeul services since 2014.

== History ==
In 2011, Hyundai-Rotem and Korail signed an agreement for an order of 23 six-car units, with deliveries in 2014.

On 15 October 2013, the first set was delivered to Korail.

The EMU-150 entered service in 2014 on ITX-Saemaeul limited-express services.

== Export variant ==
In 2021, an order of 10 8-car trainsets was received for an export variant for Tanzania as part of its Standard Gauge Railway, with the appearance resembling this model. The trains are gradually delivered from 2024 onwards.

== Fleet list in Korail ==
As of August 2020, the fleet is as follows:

Set number	Date delivered	Status	Remarks
01	2013	In Operation	
02	2013	In Operation	
03	2013	In Operation	
04	2013	In Operation	
05	2013	Decommissioned (Derailed into carwash)	
06	2013	In Operation	
07	2013	In Operation	
08	2013	In Operation	
09	2013	In Operation	
10	2013	In Operation	
11	2013	In Operation	
12	2013	In Operation	
13	2013	In Operation	
14	2013	In Operation	
15	2013	In Operation	
16	2013	In Operation	
17	2013	In Operation	
18	2013	In Operation	
19	2013	In Operation	
20	2013	In Operation	
21	2013	In Operation	
22	2013	In Operation	
23	2013	In Operation	

== Gallery ==
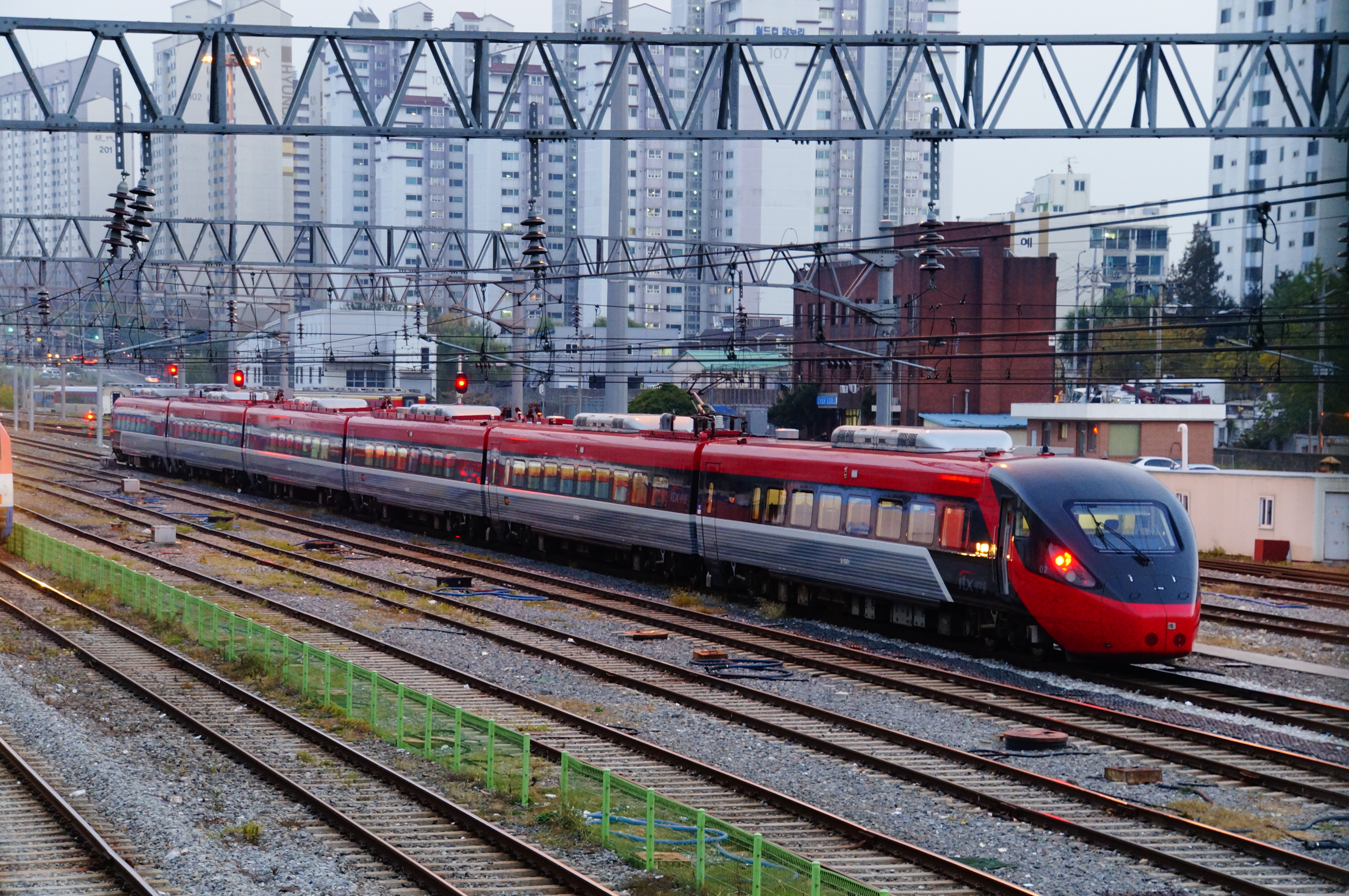

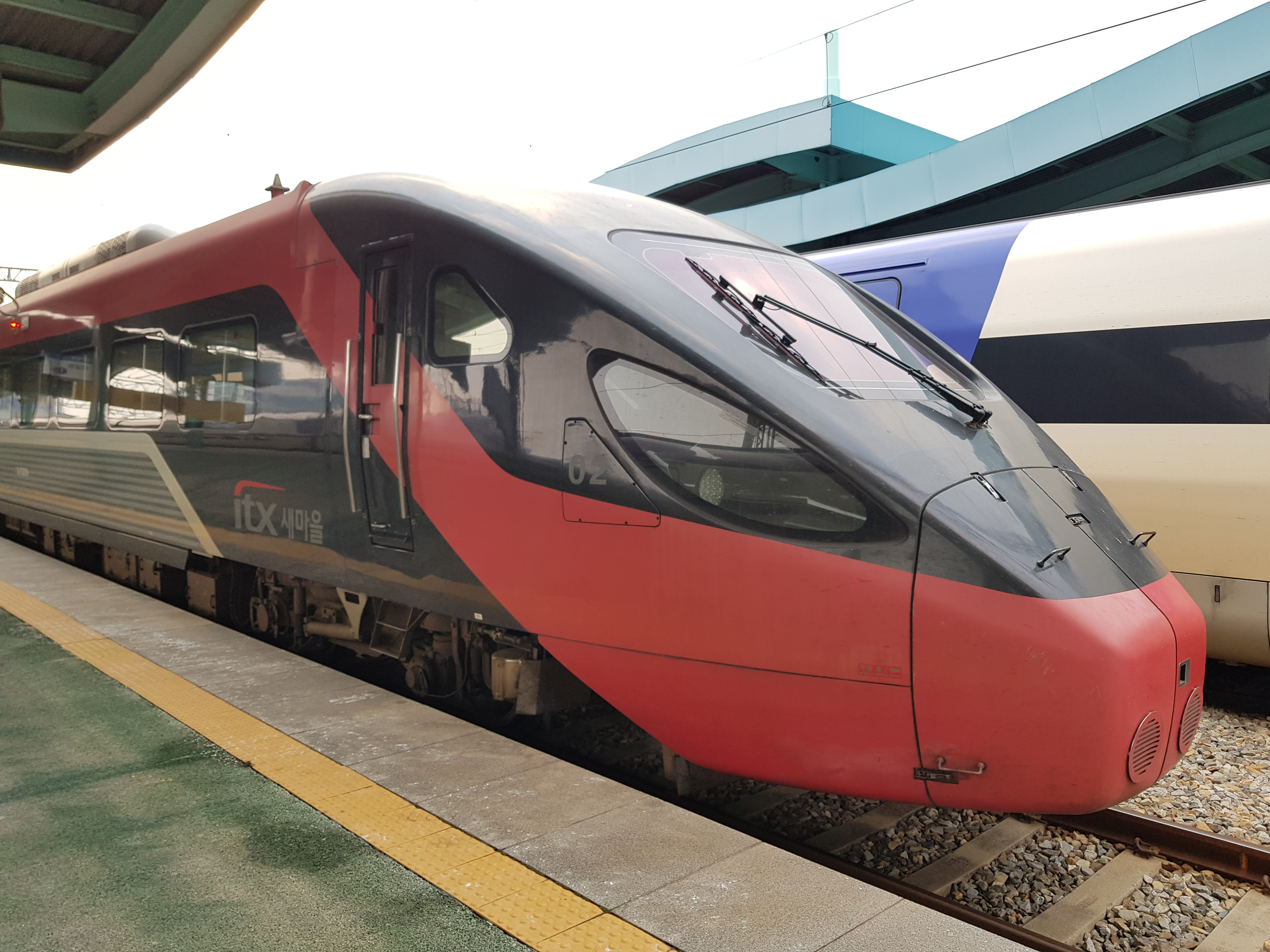

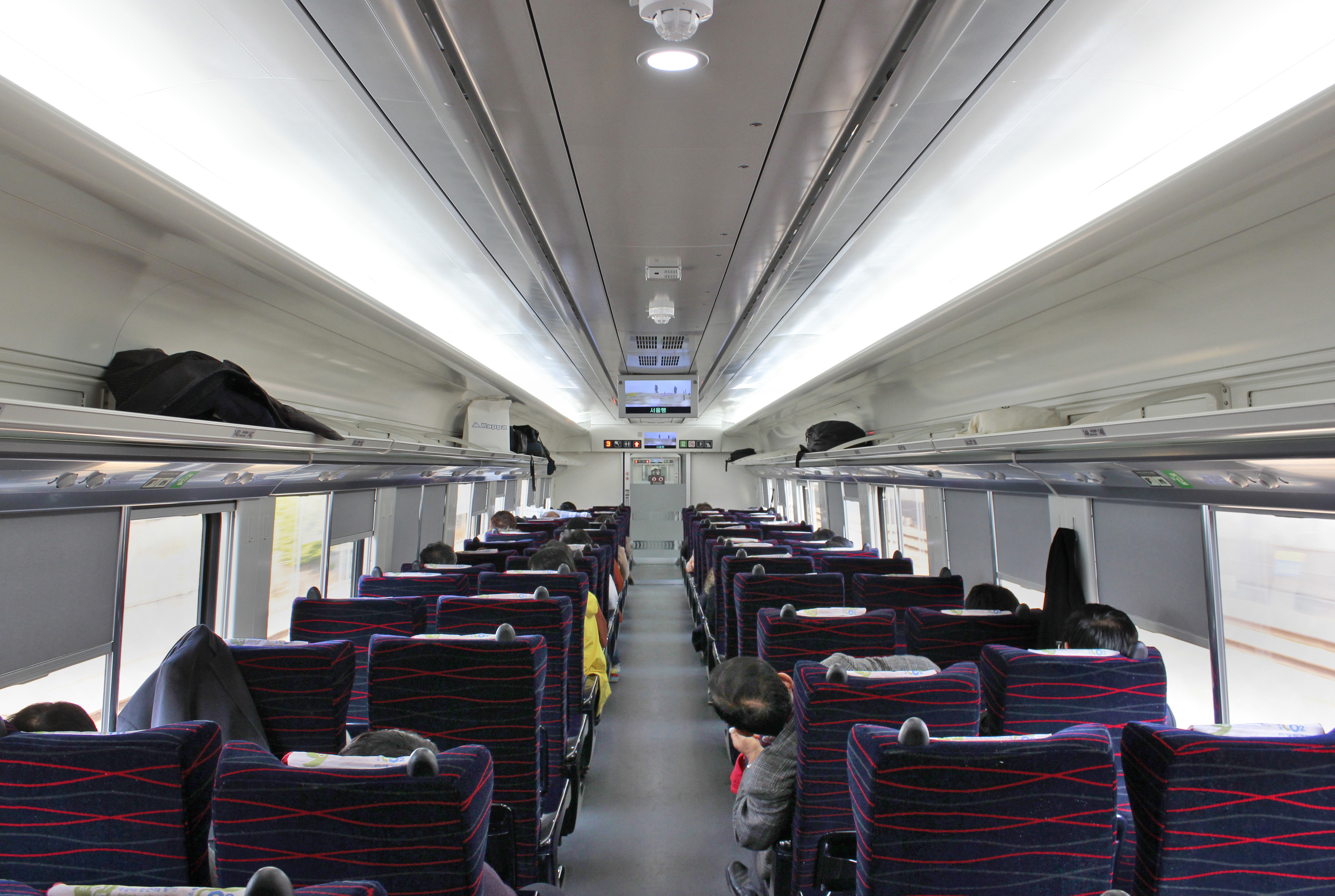

== See also ==
- List of high speed trains
- Rail transport in South Korea
- ITX-Saemaeul
- ITX-Maum
- Korail Class 220000
- Media related to Korail Class 210000 at Wikimedia Commons
