= ITX-Saemaeul =

Class of passenger train service in South Korea

Overview
- Service type: Inter-city rail (Higher-speed rail)
- Status: Operating
- Locale: South Korea
- Predecessor: Saemaeul-ho
- First service: May 12, 2014
- Current operator: Korail

Technical
- Rolling stock: Korail Class 210000
- Track gauge: 1,435 mm (4 ft 8 1/2 in) standard gauge
- Operating speed: 150 km/h (95 mph)

The Intercity Train eXpress-Saemaeul (ITX-Saemaeul; Korean: ITX-새마을) is a class of higher-speed trains operated by Korail, the national railroad of South Korea. It was introduced on May 12, 2014 to replace the Saemaeul-ho. The ITX-Saemaeul trains have a faster maximum speed of 150 kilometers per hour. While they are faster than the Mugunghwa-ho trains, they are still slower than the high-speed KTX. The name was taken from the Saemaul Undong after a public competition to determine the new train's name.

== Stops ==
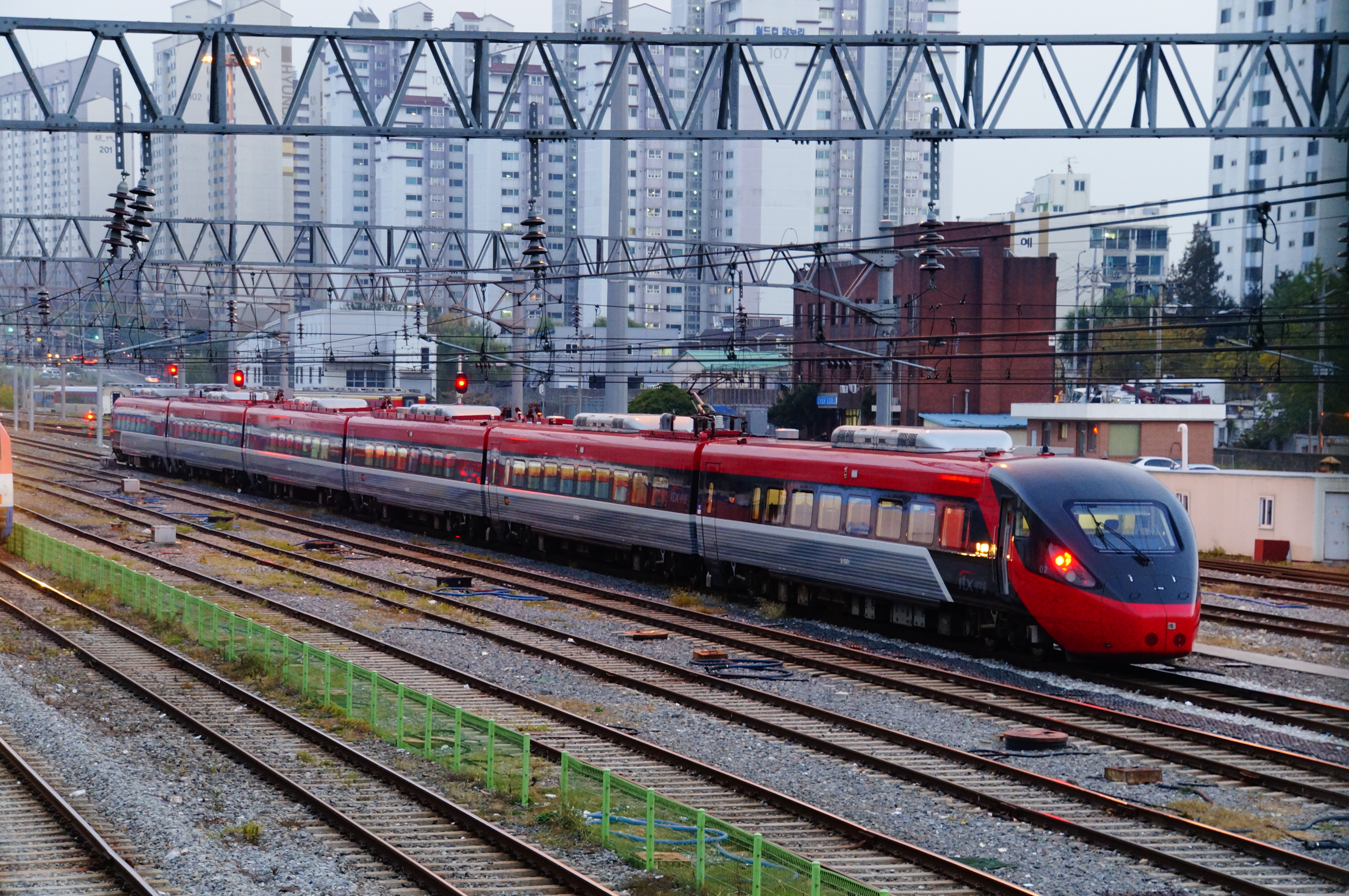
Korail Class 210000 EMU on a ITX-Saemaeul service waiting at Susaek Yard

==== Stations served ====
Gyeongbu Line: Seoul, Yeongdeungpo, Anyang, Suwon, Osan, Seojeong-ri, Pyeongtaek, Seonghwan, Cheonan, Jochiwon, Bugang, Sintanjin, Daejeon, Okcheon, Iwon, Yeongdong, Hwanggan, Gimcheon, Gumi, Waegwan, Daegu, Dongdaegu, Gyeongsan, Namseonghyeon, Cheongdo, Sangdong, Miryang, Samnangjin, Wondong, Mulgeum, Hwamyeong, Gupo, Sasang, Busan

Gyeongjeon Line: Seoul, Yeongdeungpo, Suwon, Pyeongtaek, Cheonan, Jochiwon, Daejeon, Gimcheon, Gumi, Waegwan, Daegu, Dongdaegu, Cheongdo, Miryang, Jinyeong, Changwonjungang, Changwon, Masan, Haman, Jinju

Honam Line: Yongsan, Yeongdeungpo, Suwon, Osan, Seojeong-ri, Pyeongtaek, Seonghwan, Cheonan, Jochiwon, Bugang, Seodaejeon, Gyeryong, Nonsan, Ganggyeong, Iksan, Gimje, Sintaein, Jeongeup, Baegyangsa, Jangseong, GwangjuSongjeong, Naju, Hampyeong, Mongtan, Muan, Illo, Mokpo

Gwangju Line: Yongsan, Yeongdeungpo, Anyang, Suwon, Pyeongtaek, Cheonan, Jochiwon, Sintanjin, Seodaejeon, Gyeryong, Nonsan, Ganggyeong, Iksan, Gimje, Sintaein, Jeongeup, Baegyangsa, Jangseong, Geungnakgang, Gwangju

Jeolla Line: Yongsan, Yeongdeungpo, Suwon, Pyeongtaek, Cheonan, Jochiwon, Sintanjin, Seodaejeon, Gyeryong, Nonsan, Ganggyeong, Iksan, Jeonju, Namwon, Gokseong, Guryegu, Suncheon, Yeocheon, Yeosu-Expo

== Rolling stock ==
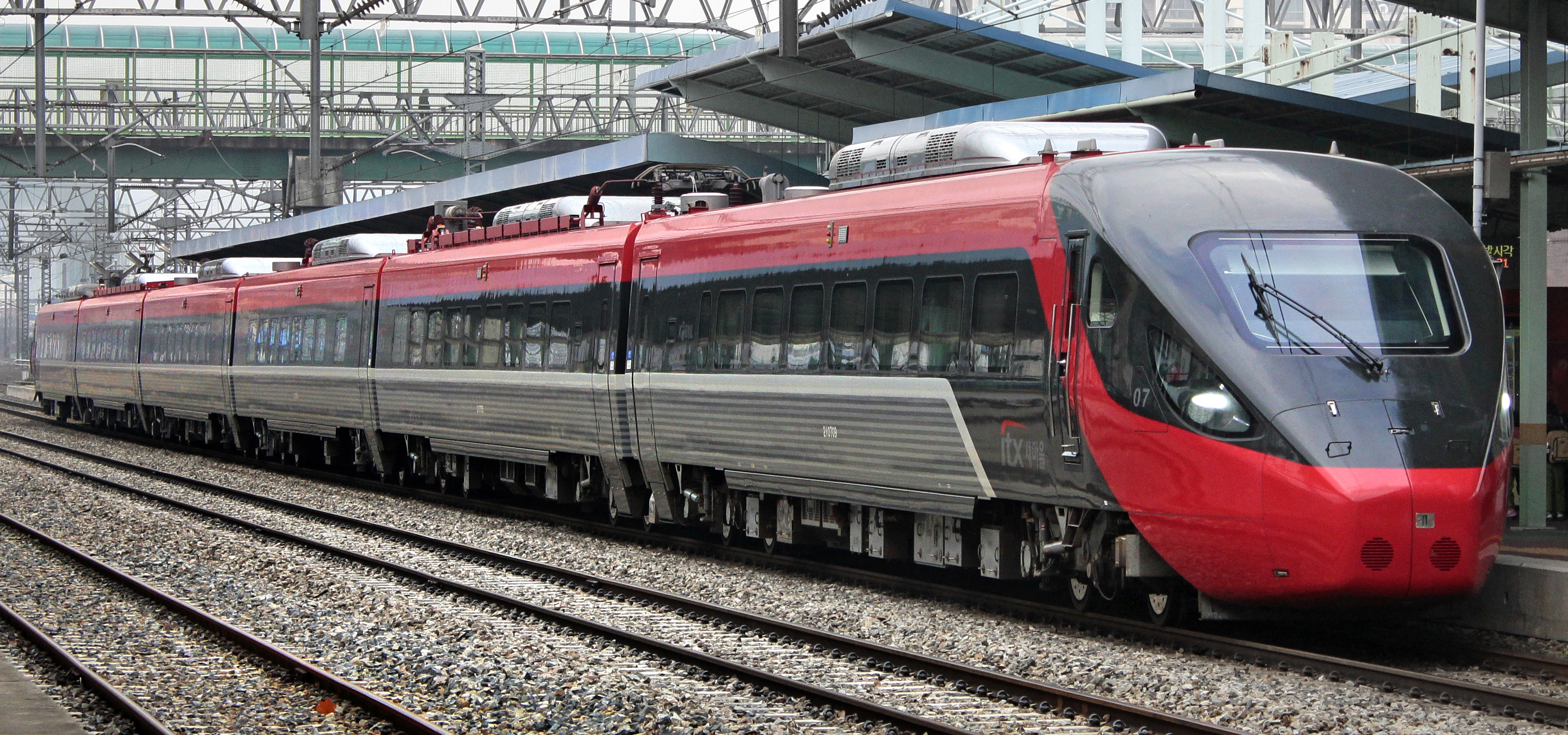
A ITX-Saemaeul Korail Class 210000 train in November 2014

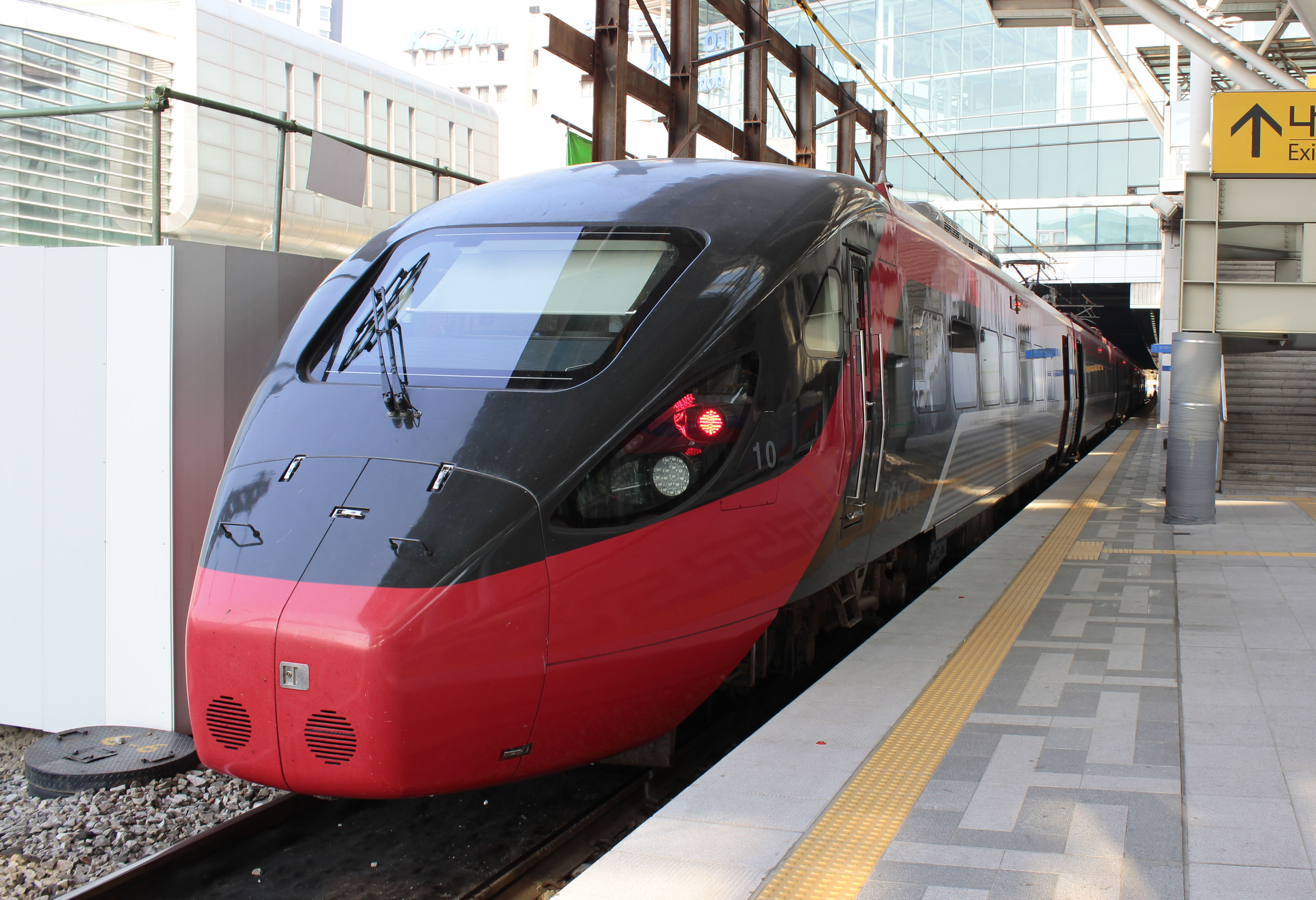
Korail Class 210000

- Korail Class 210000 (since October 2014)

=== Formations ===
Car No.	1	2	3	4	5	6
Numbering	21XX09	21XX55	21XX04	21XX53	21XX52	21XX01
Accommodation	Reserved	Reserved	Reserved	Reserved	Reserved	Reserved

The rolling stock was manufactured by Hyundai Rotem.

== Interior ==
Seats are laid out in a 2+2 abreast configuration. Seat pitch is 980 mm (39 in).

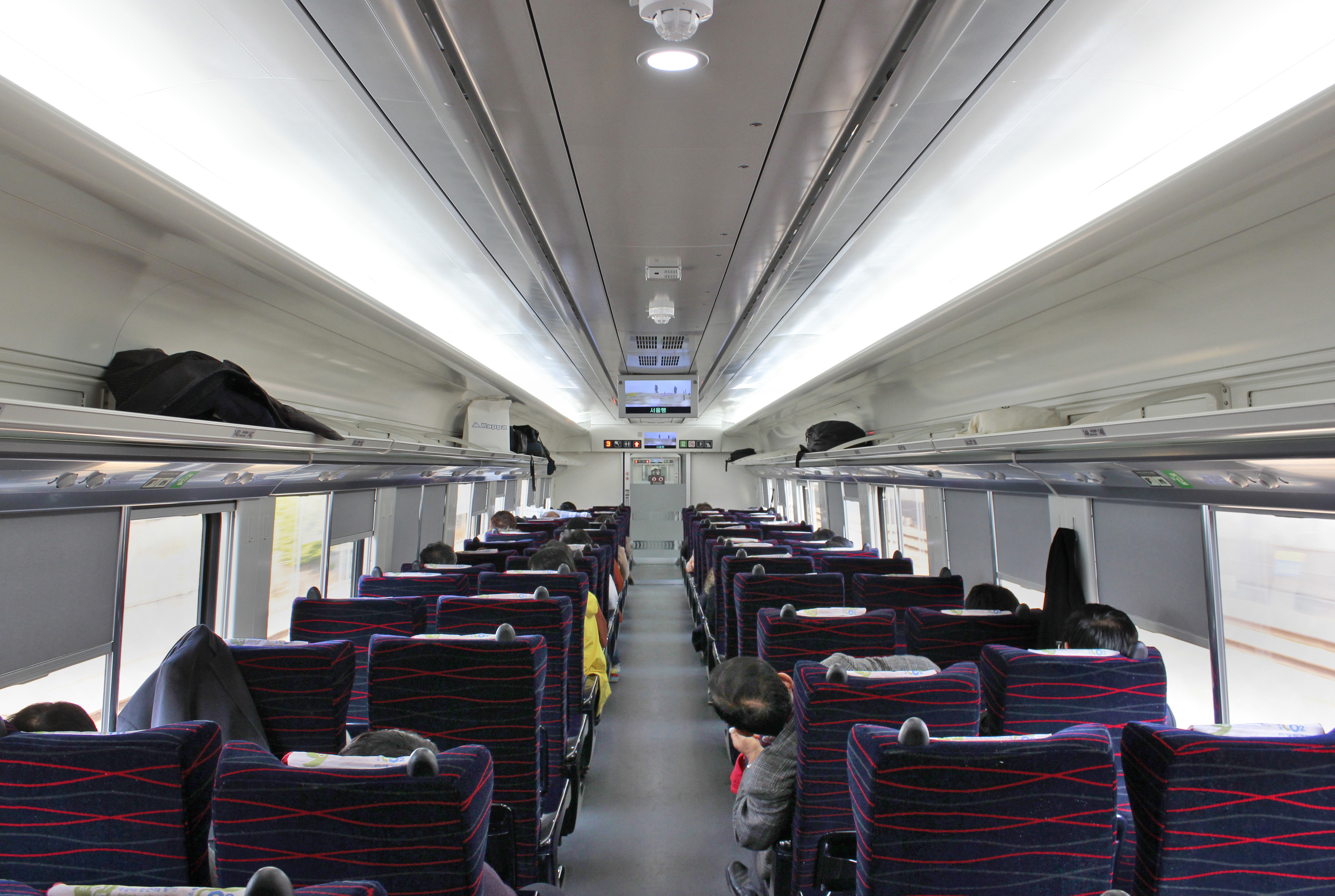
Interior
