= Sangdong station =

Railway station in South Gyeongsang Province, South Korea

Coordinates: 35°33′20″N 128°45′38″E

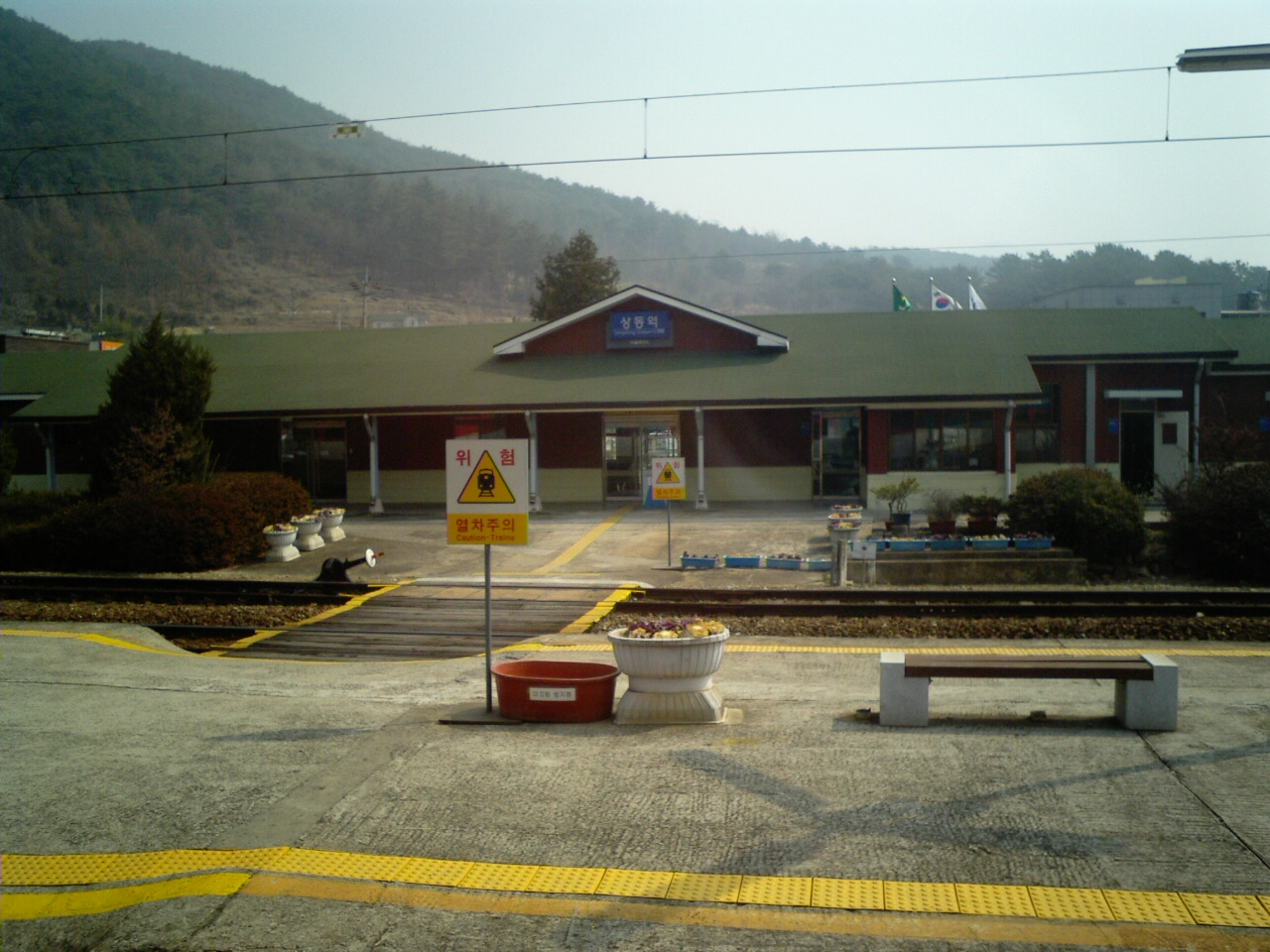
facade of the station

Sangdong station (상동역, Hanja: 上東驛) is a railway station on the Gyeongbu Line in South Korea. It is located in Sangdong-myeon, a rural area of northern Miryang. It was originally built in 1906 as Yucheon station, and retained that name until it was renamed Sangdong in 2000.

The existing station building was constructed in 1967. In 2021, the city government announced plans for a major expansion of the station building, to be completed in 2024. In 2024, the expected completion date was changed to March 2026.

The station is served only by passenger trains in the Mugunghwa-ho class. Twenty-six trains stop there each day. The station formerly also provided freight service, but this ended in 2008.

Preceding station	Korail	Following station
Cheongdo towards Seoul	ITX-Saemaeul Gyeongbu Line	Miryang towards Busan
Cheongdo towards Daejeon	ITX-Maum Gyeongbu Line	Miryang towards Busan
Cheongdo towards Dongdaegu	ITX-Maum Gyeongjeon Line	Miryang towards Jinju
Cheongdo towards Daejeon or Seoul	Mugunghwa-ho Gyeongbu Line	Miryang towards Busan
Cheongdo towards Dongdaegu	Mugunghwa-ho Gyeongjeon Line	Miryang towards Jinju
