= Miryang station =

Railway station in South Gyeongsang Province, South Korea

Coordinates: 35°28′31.12″N 128°46′12.72″E

밀양
Miryang
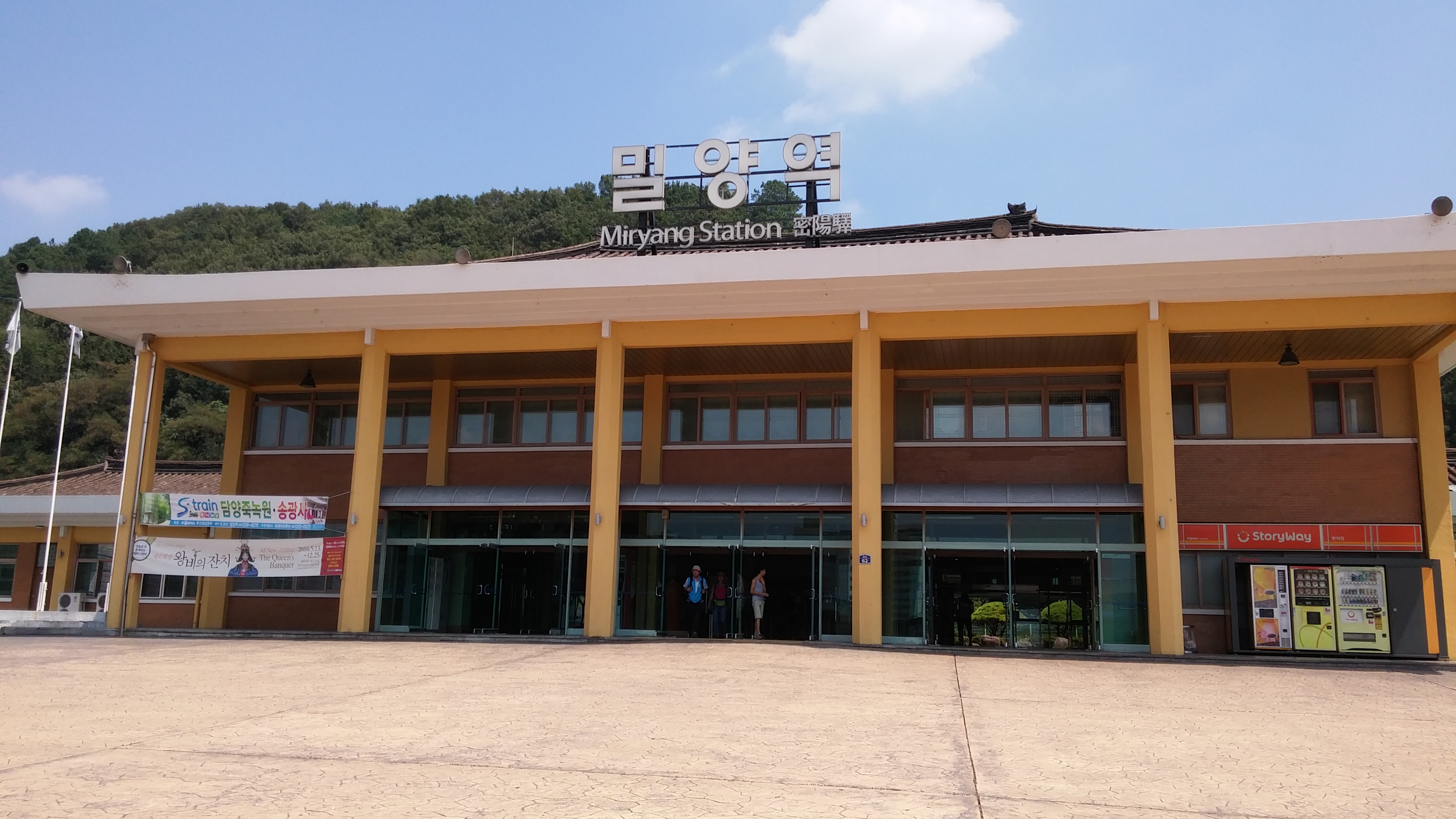
- Station building

Korean name
- Hangul: 밀양역
- Hanja: 密陽驛
- RR: Miryang-yeok
- MR: Miryang-yŏk

General information
- Operator: Korail
- Line: Gyeongbu Line
- Platforms: 2
- Tracks: 4

Construction
- Structure type: Aboveground/Straight

Key dates
- January 1, 1905: opened

Services
| Preceding station | Korea Train Express | Following station |
|---|---|---|
| Gyeongsan towards Haengsin or Suseo | Gyeongbu KTX | Gupo towards Busan |
| Preceding station | Korail | Following station |
| Sangdong towards Seoul | ITX-Saemaeul Gyeongbu Line | Mulgeum towards Busan |
| Sangdong towards Seoul | ITX-Saemaeul Gyeongbu Line via Samnangjin | Samnangjin towards Busan |
| Cheongdo towards Seoul | ITX-Saemaeul Gyeongjeon Line | Jinyeong towards Jinju |
| Cheongdo towards Seoul | ITX-Maum Gyeongbu Line | Samnangjin towards Busan |
| Sangdong towards Daejeon | ITX-Maum Gyeongbu Line via Sangdong | Samnangjin towards Busan |
| Sangdong towards Dongdaegu | ITX-Maum Gyeongjeon Line | Hallimjeong towards Jinju |
| Sangdong towards Daejeon or Seoul | Mugunghwa-ho Gyeongbu Line | Samnangjin towards Busan |
| Sangdong towards Dongdaegu | Mugunghwa-ho Gyeongjeon Line | Hallimjeong towards Jinju |
Location

Miryang station is on the normal speed Gyeongbu Line, 55 km south of Dongdaegu Station. Miryang station is an important branch of the Gyeongbu and Gyeongjeon lines. The surrounding area is filled with numerous tourist attractions such as Ice Valley, Pyochungsa Temple, Pyochungbi, Jaejak Mountain and Unmun Mountain, as well as famous mountains called Yeongnam Alps. Especially in summer, there is a theater festival held in Miryang Theater Village and a cool ice valley without long clothes. It is a station that is the center of economy and tourism.

== History ==
The station opened on January 1, 1905, to trains on the Gyeongbu Line. The building was destroyed by fire on February 12, 1962. The station was elevated in its determined importance on March 3, 1972, and a new station building was completed on December 28, 1982. KTX trains on the normal speed Gyeongbu Line began services on April 1, 2004.

== Services ==
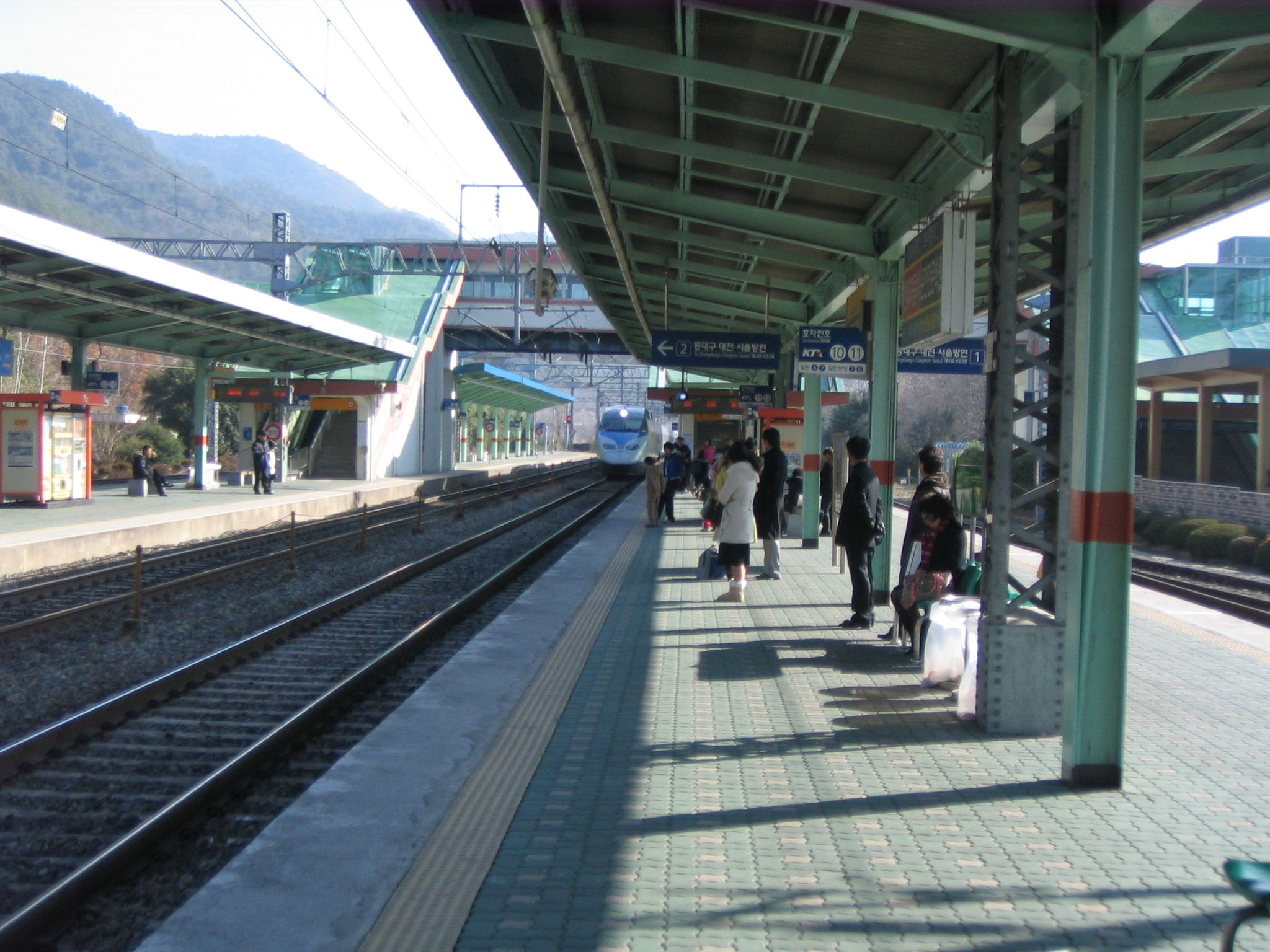
KTX at Miryang station

Miryang station serves KTX, ITX-Saemaeul, ITX-Maum and Mugunghwa-ho trains on the normal speed Gyeongbu Line.

== See also ==
- Transportation in South Korea
- Korail
- KTX
