= Cheongdo station =

Railway station in Cheongdo, South Korea

청도
Cheongdo
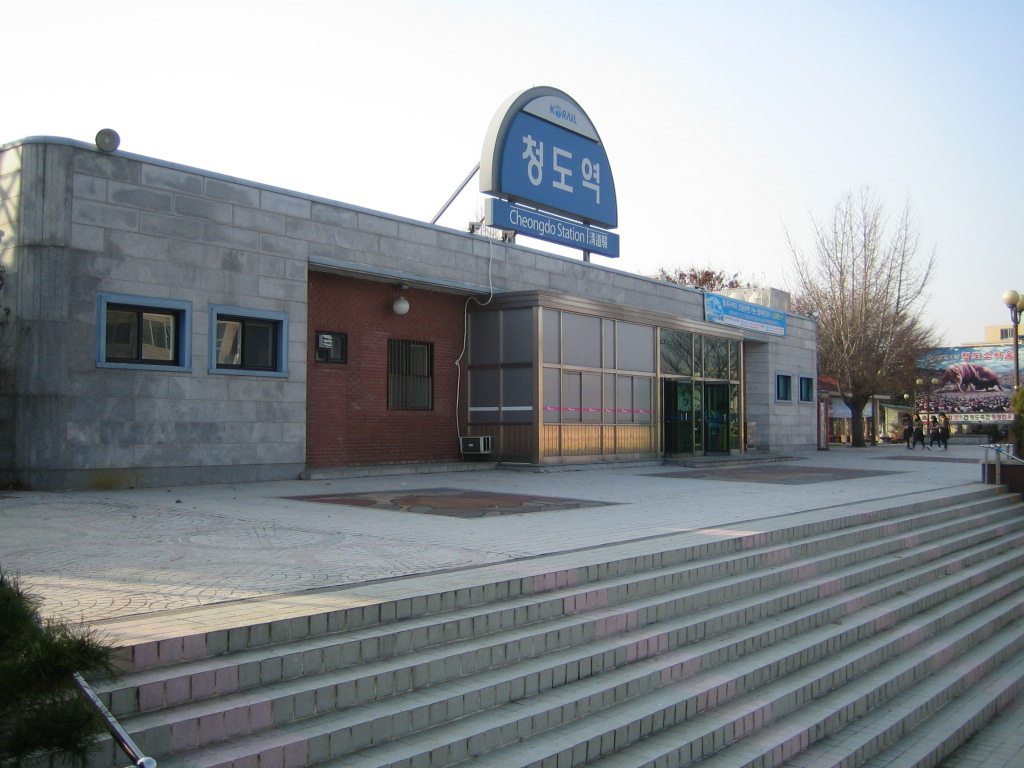

Korean name
- Hangul: 청도역
- Hanja: 淸道驛
- Revised Romanization: Cheongdoyeok
- McCune–Reischauer: Ch'ŏngdoyŏk

General information
- Location: Gosu-ri, Cheongdo-eup, Cheongdo, North Gyeongsang; South Korea
- Coordinates: 35°38′24″N 128°44′47″E
- Operator: Korail
- Line: Gyeongbu Line
- Platforms: 2
- Tracks: 4

Construction
- Structure type: Aboveground

History
- Opened: January 1, 1905

Services
| Preceding station | Korail | Following station |
|---|---|---|
| Gyeongsan towards Seoul | ITX-Saemaeul Gyeongbu Line | Sangdong towards Busan |
| Namseonghyeon towards Dongdaegu | ITX-Saemaeul Gyeongbu Line via Namseonghyeon | Sangdong towards Busan |
| Dongdaegu towards Seoul | ITX-Saemaeul Gyeongjeon Line | Miryang towards Jinju |
| Gyeongsan towards Seoul | ITX-Maum Gyeongbu Line | Miryang towards Busan |
| Namseonghyeon towards Dongdaegu | ITX-Maum Gyeongbu Line via Namseonghyeon | Sangdong towards Busan |
| Gyeongsan towards Daejeon | ITX-Maum Gyeongbu Line via Sangdong | Sangdong towards Busan |
| Namseonghyeon towards Dongdaegu | ITX-Maum Gyeongjeon Line | Sangdong towards Jinju |
| Namseonghyeon towards Daejeon or Seoul | Mugunghwa-ho Gyeongbu Line | Sangdong towards Busan |
| Namseonghyeon towards Dongdaegu | Mugunghwa-ho Gyeongjeon Line | Sangdong towards Jinju |
Location

Cheongdo station (Korean: 청도역) is a railway station on the Gyeongbu Line, located in Cheongdo, North Gyeongsang Province, South Korea. It began operations in 1905, and the current station building was constructed in 1987. It is served by Mugunghwa-ho and ITX-Saemaeul passenger trains.
