= Jitan station =

Train station in South Korea

Coordinates: 36°14′30″N 127°40′33″E

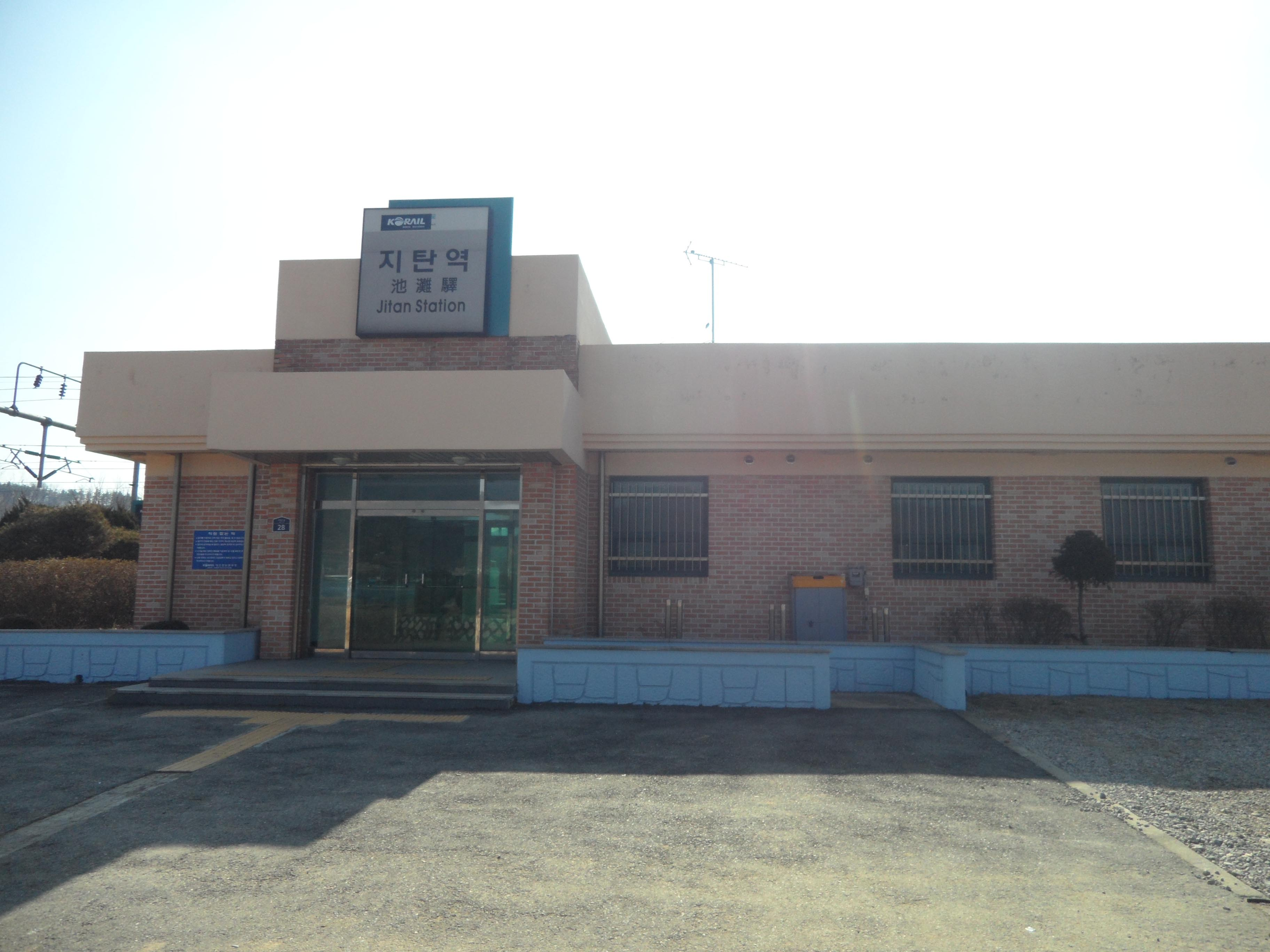
Jitan Station, Okcheon County

Jitan station is a railway station on the Gyeongbu Line in Korea.

The station is normally unstaffed. It has a sister twinning relationship with Japan’s Hayabusa Station.

Preceding station	Korail	Following station
Okcheon towards Daejeon	ITX-Maum Gyeongbu Line	Yeongdong towards Busan
Simcheon towards Dongdaegu	Mugunghwa-ho Chungbuk Line	Iwon towards Yeongju
