= Okcheon station =

Train stop in South Korea

Coordinates: 36°17′51.57″N 127°33′55.03″E

옥천
Okcheon
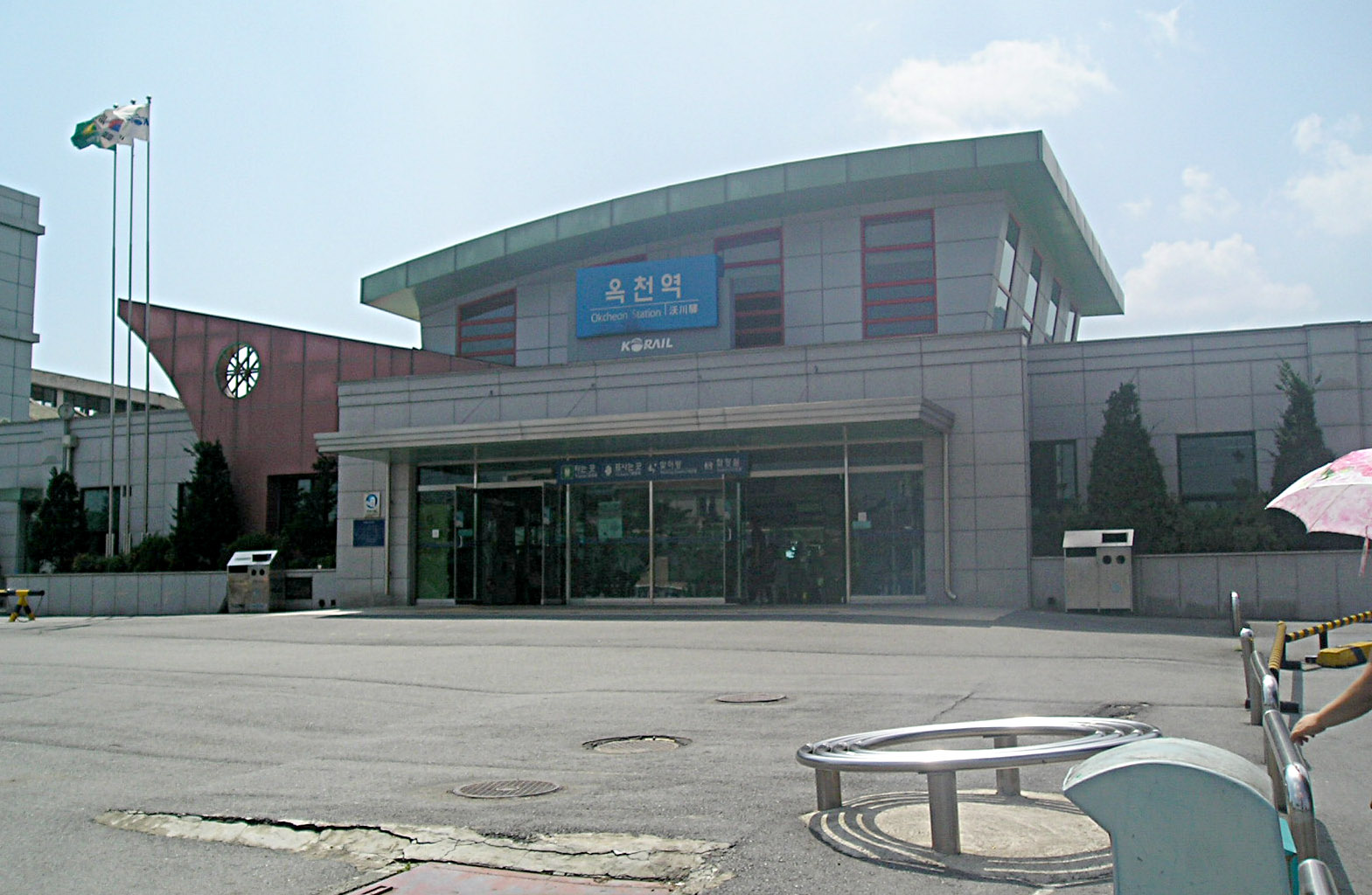

Korean name
- Hangul: 옥천역
- Hanja: 沃川驛
- Revised Romanization: Okcheon-yeok
- McCune–Reischauer: Okch'ŏn-yŏk

General information
- Platforms: 0
- Tracks: 0

Services
Preceding station	Korail	Following station
Daejeon towards Seoul	ITX-Saemaeul Gyeongbu Line	Iwon towards Busan
Daejeon towards Seoul	ITX-Maum Gyeongbu Line	Yeongdong towards Busan
Daejeon Terminus	ITX-Maum Gyeongbu Line	Iwon towards Busan
Daejeon Terminus	ITX-Maum Gyeongbu Line via Jitan	Jitan towards Busan
Daejeon towards Daejeon or Seoul	Mugunghwa-ho Gyeongbu Line	Iwon towards Busan
Iwon towards Dongdaegu	Mugunghwa-ho Chungbuk Line	Daejeon towards Yeongju
Location

Okcheon station is a railway station on the Gyeongbu Line in South Korea.

The station serves the local college.

Services to the station from Seoul were disrupted in 2024 due to strike action.
