= Jeonui station =

Train station in South Korea

Coordinates: 36°40′42″N 127°12′11″E

전의
Jeonui
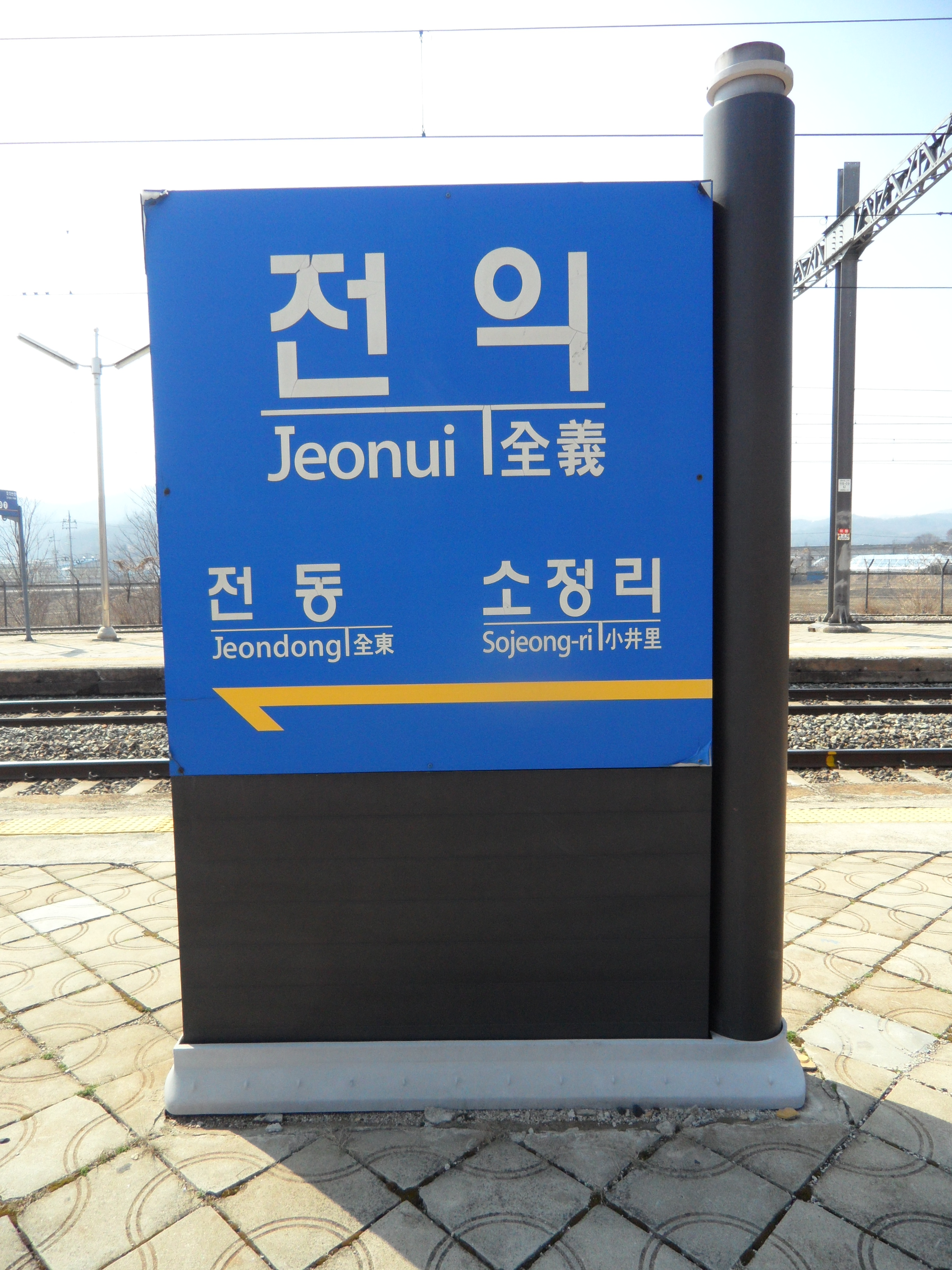

Korean name
- Hangul: 전의역
- Hanja: 全義驛
- Revised Romanization: Jeonui-yeok
- McCune–Reischauer: Chŏnŭi-yŏk

General information
- Platforms: 0
- Tracks: 0

Passengers
- (Daily) Based on January–June 2011. KR: 363

Services
Preceding station	Korail	Following station
Cheonan towards Seoul	Mugunghwa-ho Gyeongbu Line	Jochiwon towards Busan
Cheonan towards Yongsan	Mugunghwa-ho Honam Line	Jochiwon towards Mokpo
Cheonan towards Seoul	Mugunghwa-ho Chungbuk Line	Osong towards Jecheon
Cheonan towards Yongsan	Mugunghwa-ho Jeolla Line	Jochiwon towards Yeosu-Expo
Location

Jeonui station is a railway station in Jeonui-myeon, Sejong City, South Korea.

== Station ==
This station is on the Gyeongbu Line with 2 platforms for 4 tracks. Station and platforms are connected with level crossing.

There are 14 Mugunghwa-ho trains that stop at the station.
