= Seodaejeon station =

Train station in South Korea

서대전
Seodaejeon
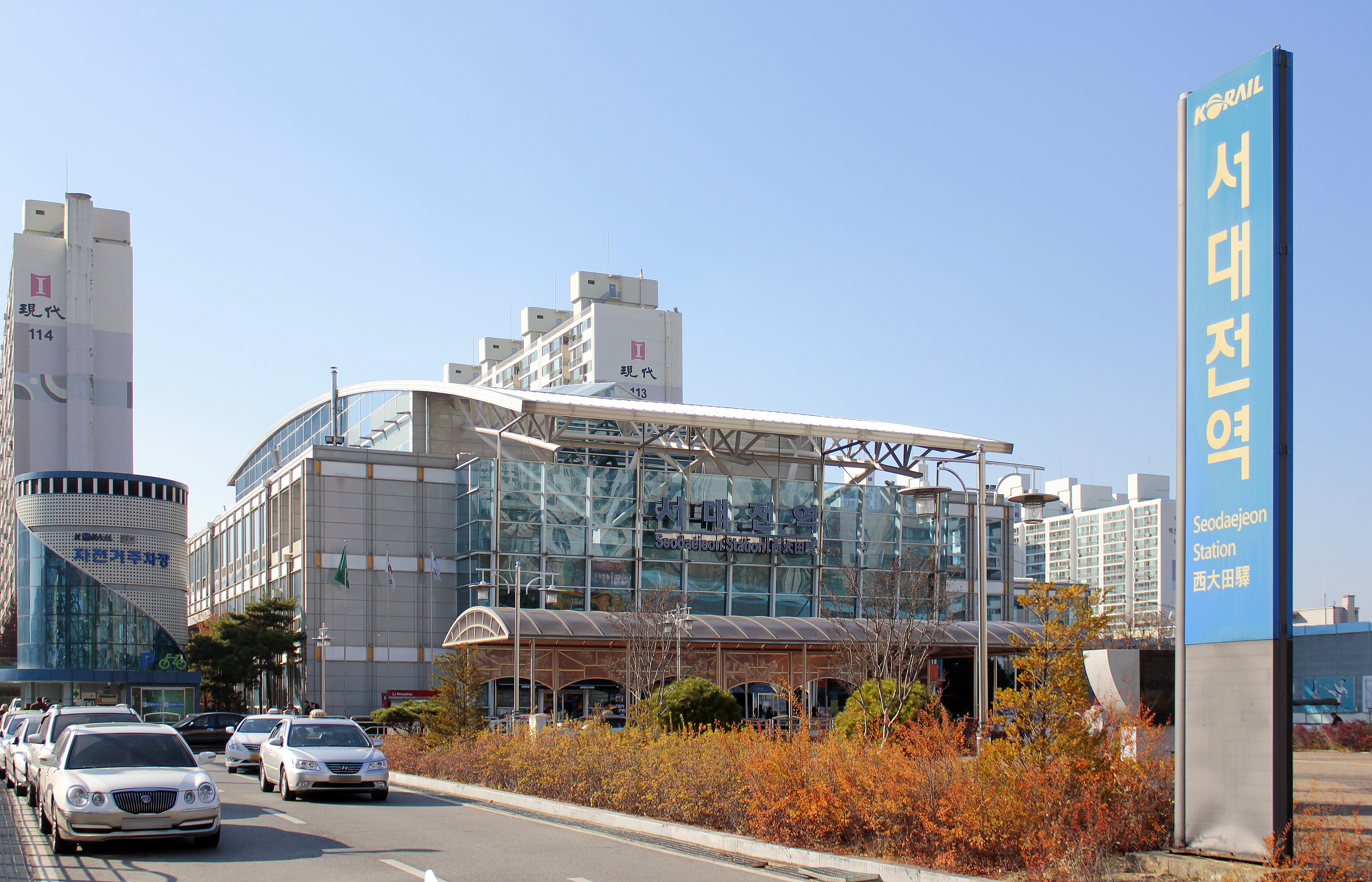

Korean name
- Hangul: 서대전역
- Hanja: 西大田驛
- Revised Romanization: Seodaejeonnyeok
- McCune–Reischauer: Sŏdaejŏnnyŏk

General information
- Location: 23 Oryu-ro, Jung District, Daejeon; South Korea
- Coordinates: 36°19′20.91″N 127°24′11.86″E
- Operator: Korail
- Line: Honam Line
- Platforms: 2
- Tracks: 6

Construction
- Structure type: Aboveground/Straight

History
- Opened: November 1, 1936
Location

Seodaejeon station, meaning "West Daejeon station", is on the normal speed Honam Line, 161 km south of Yongsan Station.

== History ==
The station opened on November 1, 1936. After that, in the 1960s, as the city of Daejeon expanded, this place also became part of the downtown area of Daejeon, and since then, the size of the station and the number of users have increased significantly.

At the end of March 1978, as the double track between Daejeonjochajang station and Seodaejeon Station was completed, the Honam Line train passed through Seodaejeon Station without passing through Daejeon Station. After that, with the promotion of Daejeon City to the metropolitan city, the construction of Dusan New Town, the destruction of Yuseong, and the hosting of the Taejon Expo '93 in 1993, the number of passengers increased and it became a station which stopped until Saemaeul-ho.

KTX trains on the normal speed Honam Line began services on April 1, 2004.

== Services ==
Seodaejeon station serves all KTX, SRT, ITX-Saemaeul & Mugunghwa trains on the normal speed Honam Line to Iksan, Gwangju or Mokpo.

== Access ==
The station is accessible by bus, or by walking from Metro line 1 station Oryong or the slightly further station Seodaejeon Negeori.

== Surroundings tourist site ==
Bomunsan, which is located in Daesa-dong, Jung-gu, Daejeon, and 11 other dongs, is one of the eight monuments in Daejeon. There are many cultural properties along with resting places such as Bomun Land, Pupu Land, Youth Square, Bomunsan Park (Sajung Park), an outdoor music hall, an observatory, amusement facilities and a cable car. There are also 10 trails, including Sylbong Road, Moonpilbong Road, and Mountain Road. The top of the mountain features monuments like Bomunsan fortress, Mae Arya, and Bomunsa Temple.

== See also ==
- Transportation in South Korea
- Korail
- KTX
