= Gyeryong station =

Train station in South Korea

계룡
Gyeryong
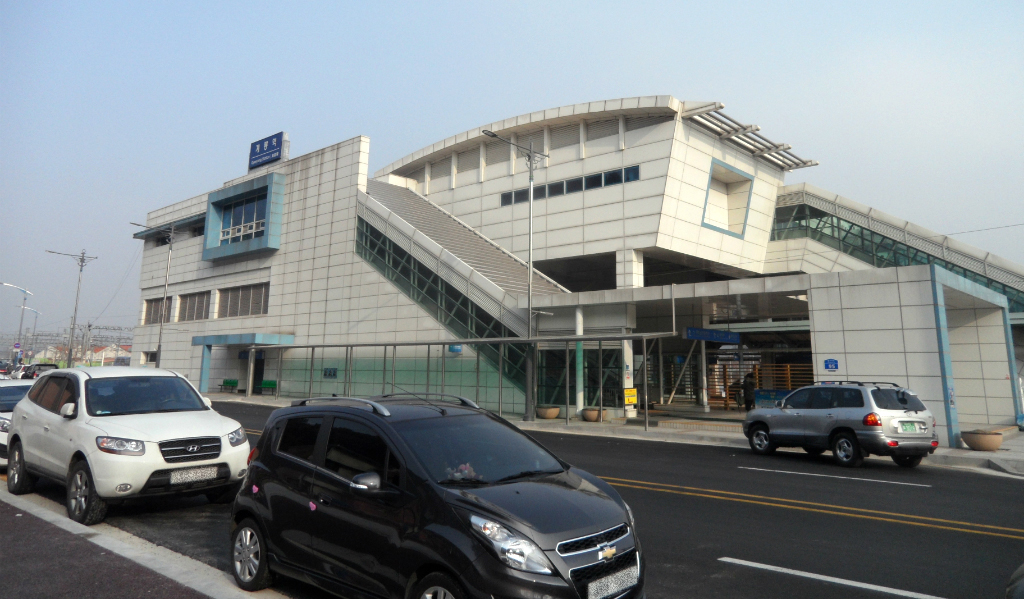

Korean name
- Hangul: 계룡역
- Hanja: 鷄龍驛
- Revised Romanization: Gyeryongnyeok
- McCune–Reischauer: Kyeryongnyŏk

General information
- Location: Dugye-ri, Duma-myeon, Gyeryong, South Chungcheong; South Korea
- Coordinates: 36°16′22″N 127°15′56″E
- Operator: Korail
- Line: Honam Line
- Platforms: 2
- Tracks: 6

Construction
- Structure type: Aboveground

History
- Opened: July 20, 1911
Location

Gyeryong station is a KTX station. It is on the Honam Line. It was formerly known as Dugye Station (Korean: 두계역), and opened on July 20, 1911.
