= Nonsan station =

Train station in South Korea

논산
Nonsan
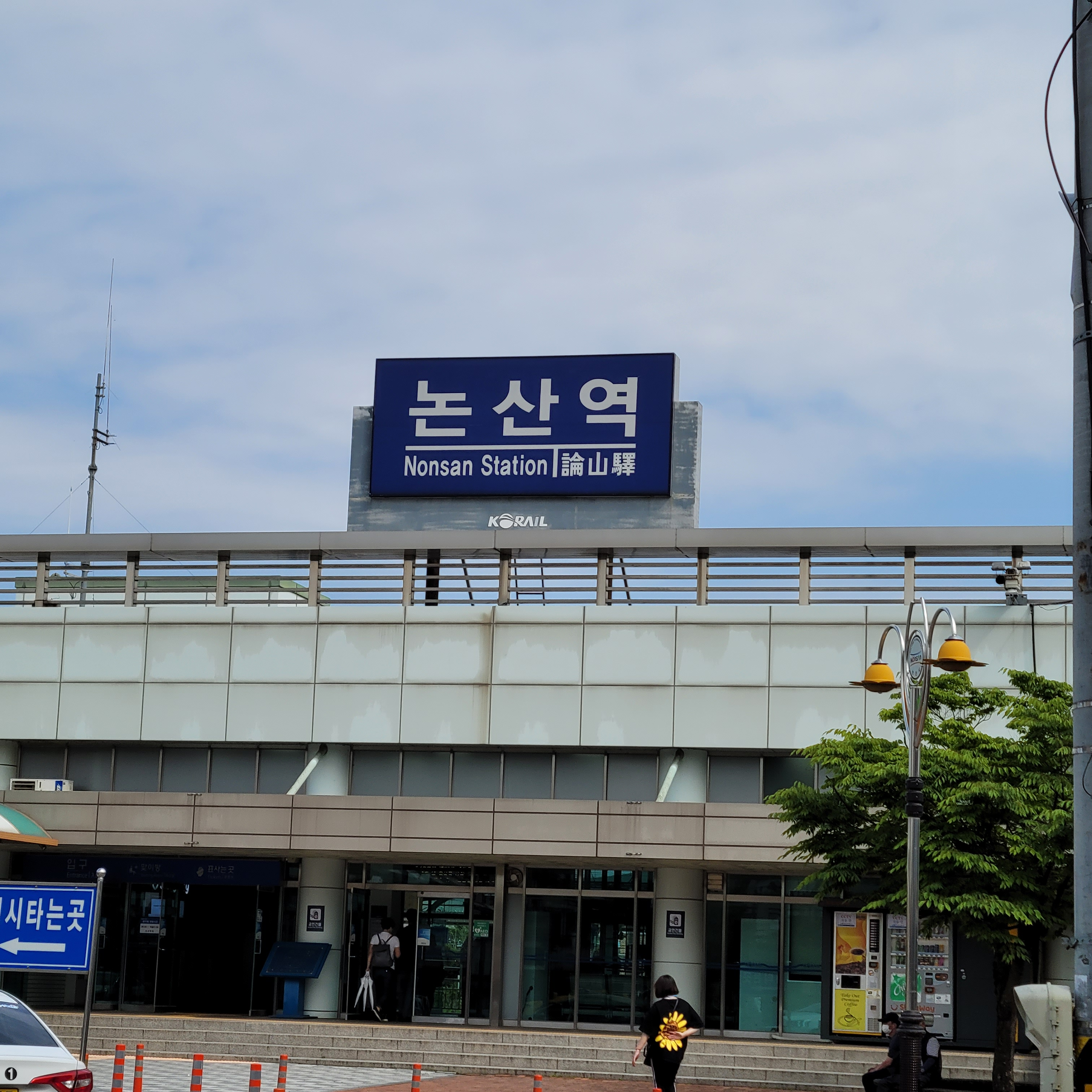
- Station building

Korean name
- Hangul: 논산역
- Hanja: 論山驛
- Revised Romanization: Nonsannyeok
- McCune–Reischauer: Nonsannyŏk

General information
- Location: Banwol-dong, Nonsan, South Chungcheong; South Korea
- Coordinates: 36°12′26″N 127°05′33″E
- Operator: Korail
- Line: Honam Line
- Platforms: 2
- Tracks: 6

Construction
- Structure type: Aboveground

History
- Opened: November 10, 1911
Location

Nonsan station is a KTX station on the Honam Line. Nonsan station opened in November 1911, and Nonsan's old name was 'Hwangsan'. The Honam KTX began to stop on April 1, 2004.
