= Gwangju station =

Train station in Gwangju, South Korea

Coordinates: 35.165326°N 126.909237°E

광주
Gwangju
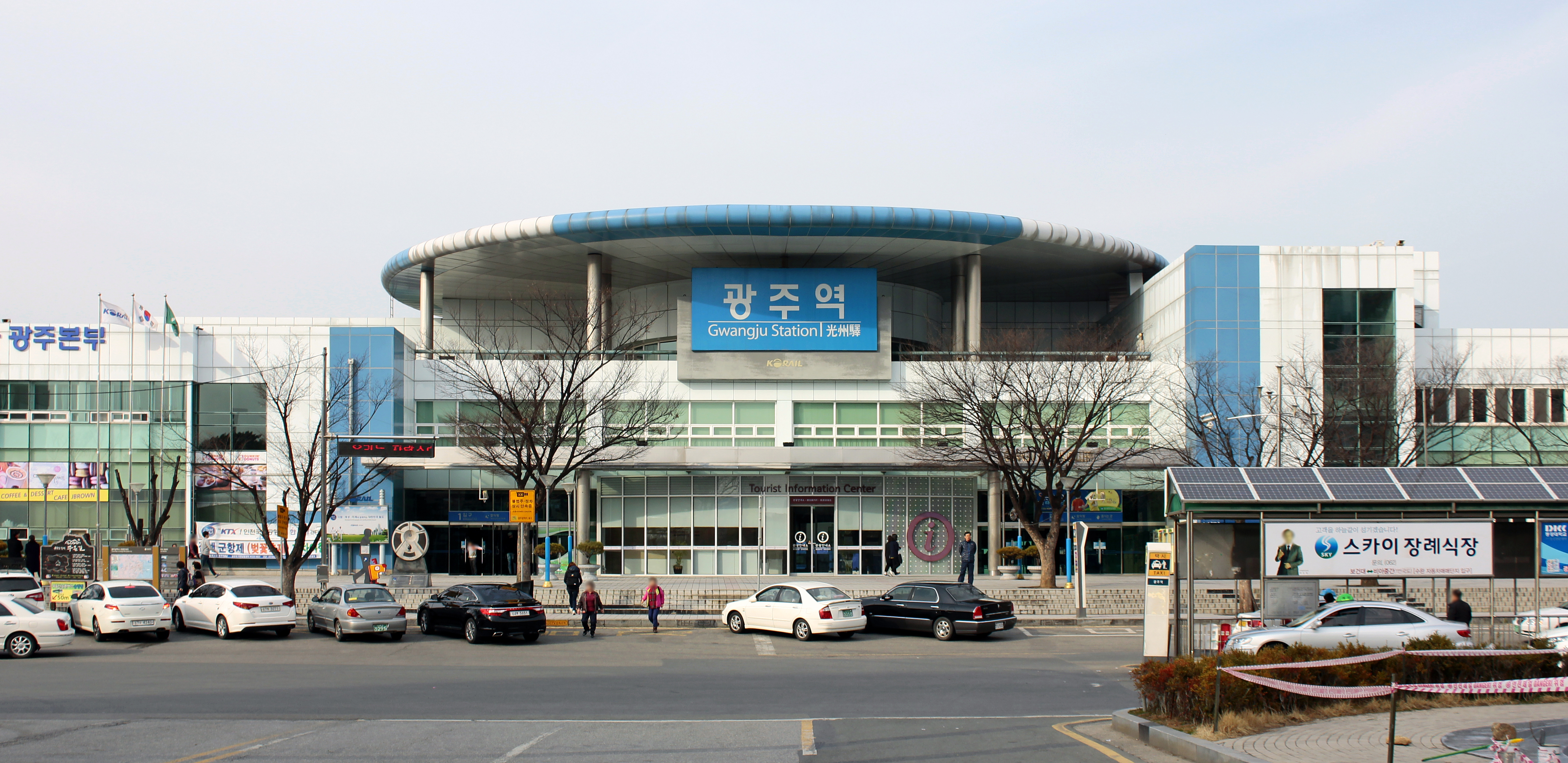
- Gwangju Station from the front

Korean name
- Hangul: 광주역
- Hanja: 光州驛
- Revised Romanization: Gwangju yeok
- McCune–Reischauer: Kwangju yŏk

General information
- Location: 611 Jungheung Dong, Buk Gu, Gwangju
- Operator: Korail
- Platforms: 3
- Tracks: 8

Construction
- Structure type: Aboveground/Straight

History
- Opened: July 1, 1922

Services
Preceding station	Korail	Following station
Geungnakgang towards Yongsan	Mugunghwa-ho	Terminus
Terminus	Mugunghwa-ho	Geungnakgang towards Mokpo
Location

Gwangju Station is a train station located in Gwangju, South Korea, 353 km south of Yongsan station.

== History ==
The station opened on July 1, 1922, and the station building was moved to its present location on July 25, 1969.

On August 10, 2000, Gwangju Station was disconnected from the Gyeongjeon Line when a southern bypass between Hyocheon and Songjeong-ri (today GwangjuSongjeong Station) was opened. The section between Songjeong-ri and Gwangju remained in use as the Gwangju Line, a spur with Gwangju Station as its terminal station.

Gwangju Station was opened on July 1, 1922 as a regular station in Daein-dong, Gwangju, and served as an important transportation role for Kwang-si until April 1, 2004. Currently, KTX operation is in charge of GwangjuSongjeong Station, and Gwangju Station serves Mugunghwa-ho and ITX-Saemaeul services.

It has stopped operating KTX since April 2015.

== Images ==
Gwangju Station entrance

Gwangju Station entrance with the city mascot

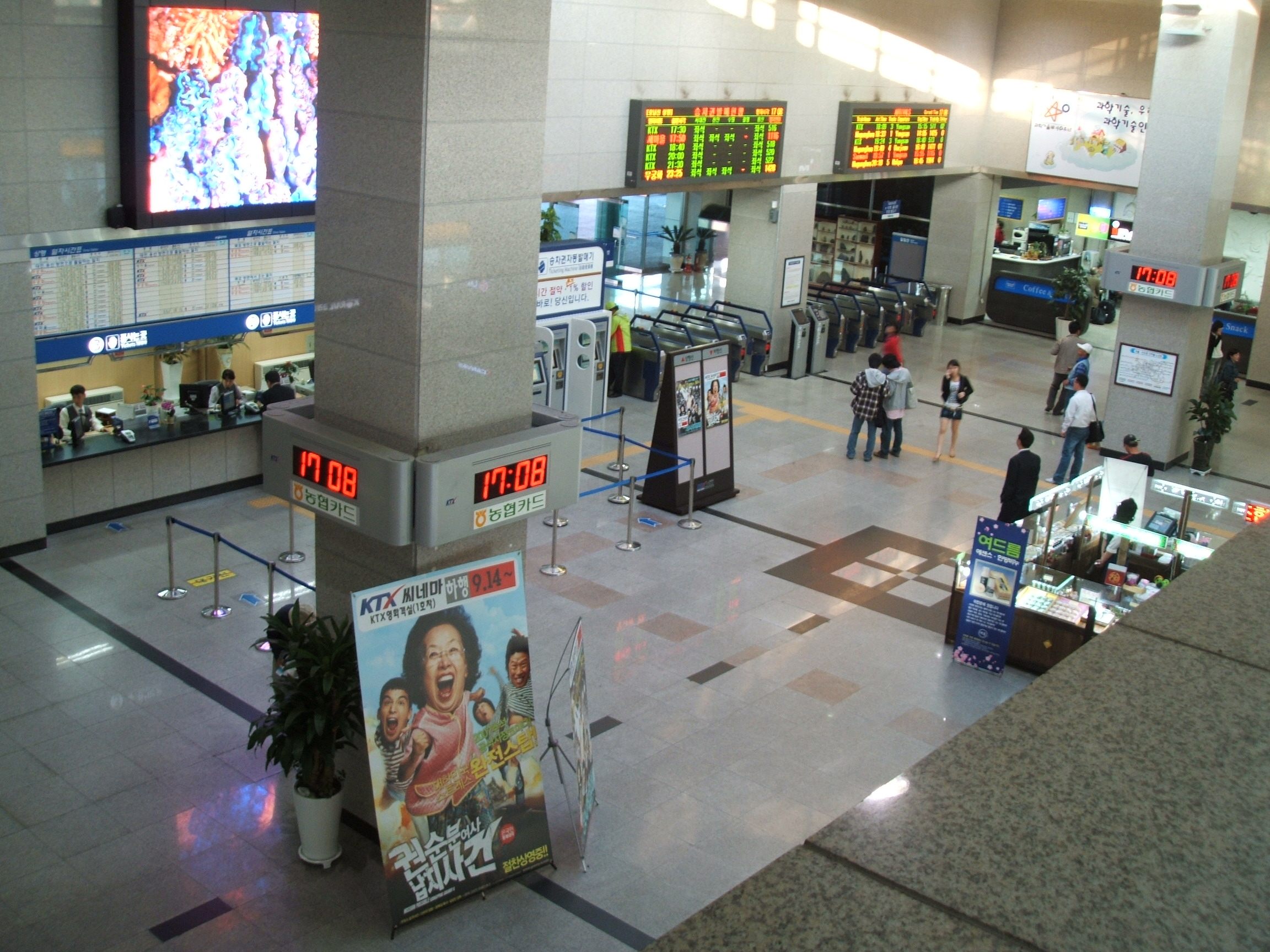
The station interior

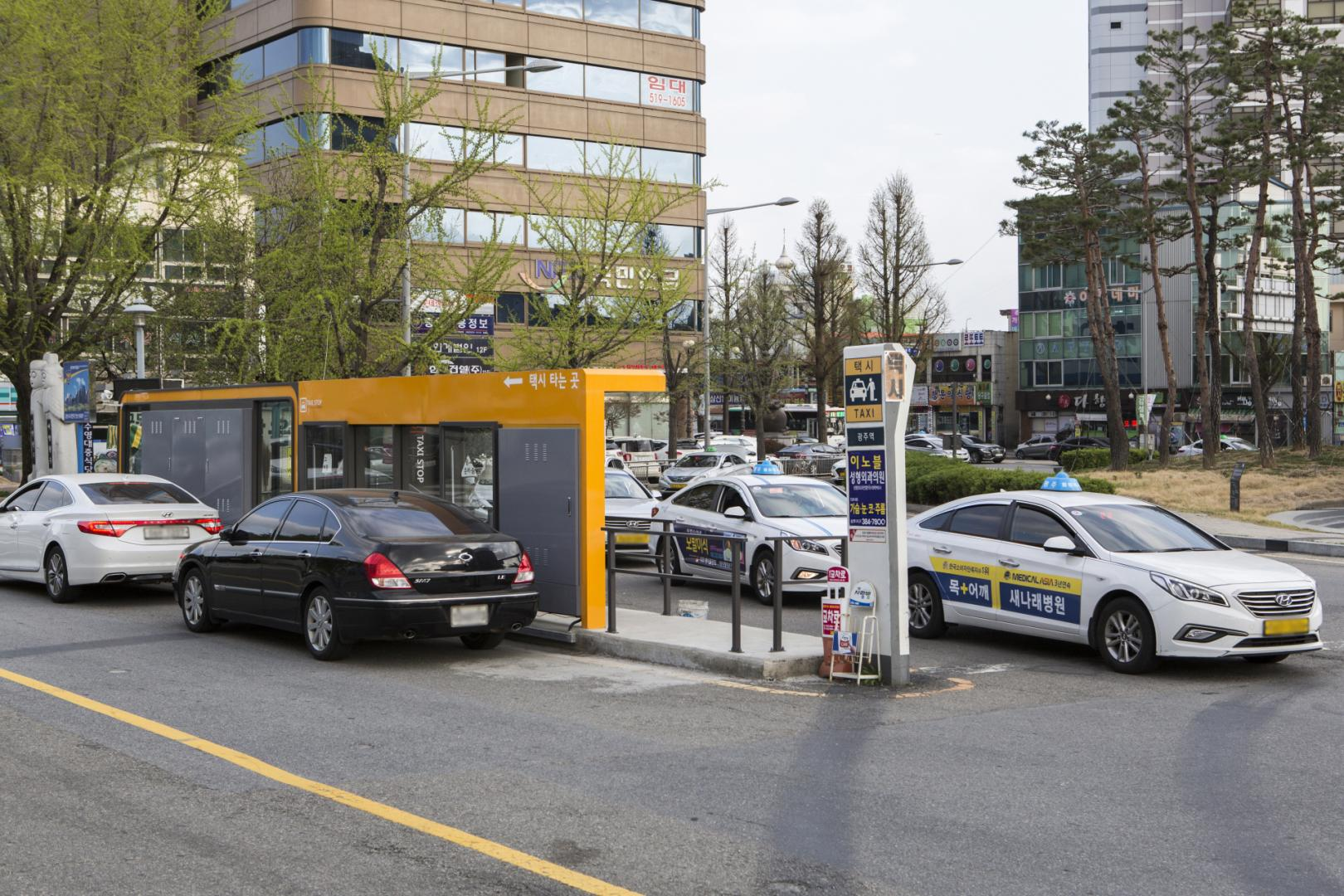
Taxi stop

== See also ==
- Transportation in South Korea
- Korail
- Korea Train Express
