= Daejeon Station =

Train station in South Korea

Coordinates: 36°19′54.82″N 127°26′4.28″E

대전
Daejeon
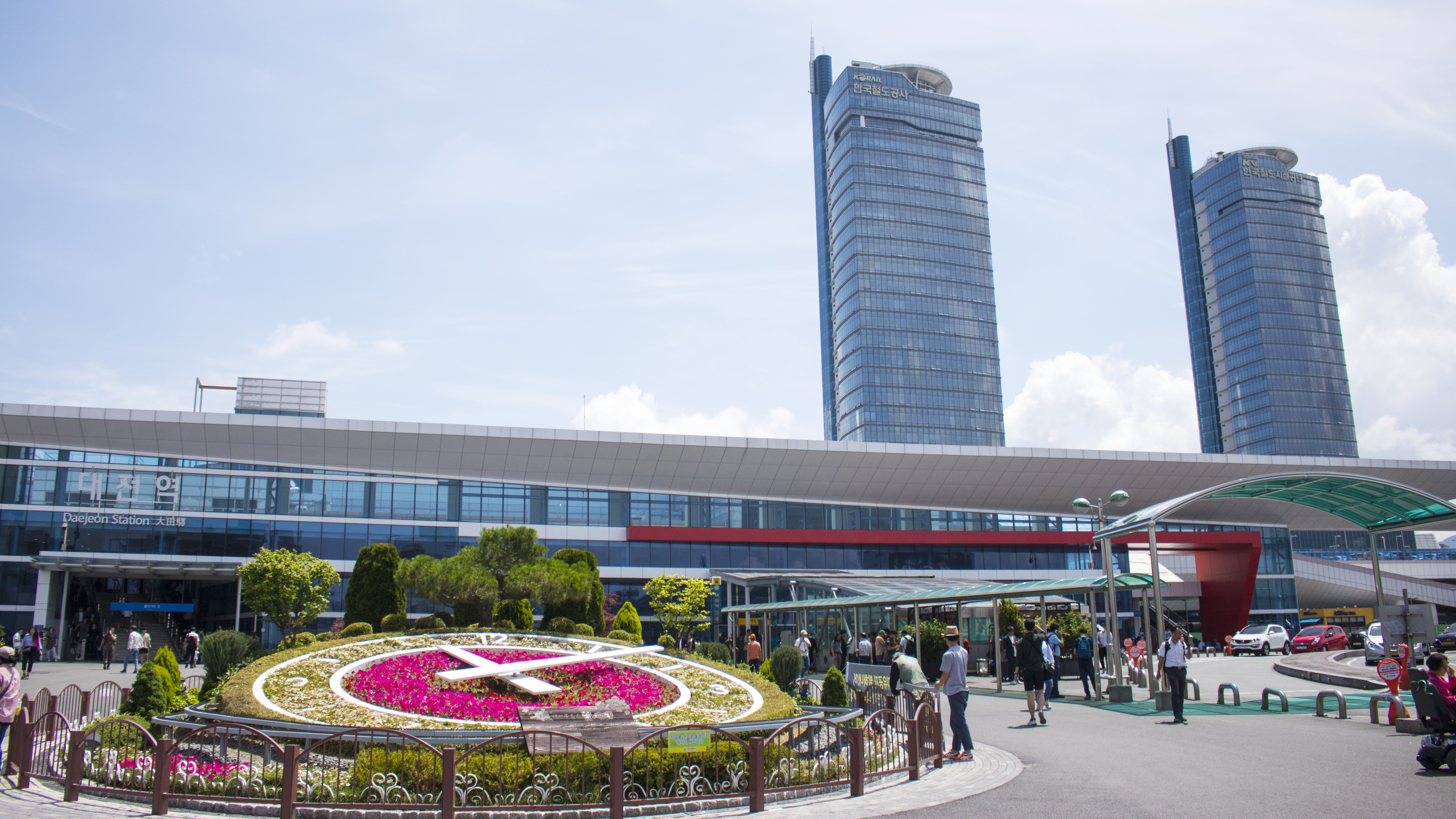

Korean name
- Hangul: 대전역
- Hanja: 大田驛
- Revised Romanization: Daejeon-yeok
- McCune–Reischauer: Taechŏn-yŏk

General information
- Location: 215 Jungang-ro, Dong District, Daejeon
- Lines: Gyeongbu Line; Gyeongbu high-speed railway
- Platforms: 6
- Tracks: 13
- Connections: Metro station

Construction
- Structure type: Aboveground/Straight

History
- Opened: January 1, 1905

Passengers
- (Daily) Based on January–June 2011. KR: 44,913

Services
Preceding station	Korea Train Express	Following station
Osong towards Haengsin or Suseo	Gyeongbu KTX	Gimcheon(Gumi) towards Busan
Suwon towards Seoul	Gyeongbu KTX via Suwon	Gimcheon(Gumi) towards Busan
Osong towards Haengsin or Suseo	Gyeongjeon KTX	Gimcheon(Gumi) towards Jinju
Osong towards Haengsin or Suseo	Donghae KTX	Gimcheon(Gumi) towards Pohang
Preceding station	Korail	Following station
Sintanjin towards Seoul	ITX-Saemaeul Gyeongbu Line	Okcheon towards Busan
Jochiwon towards Seoul	ITX-Saemaeul Gyeongjeon Line	Gimcheon towards Jinju
Sintanjin towards Seoul	ITX-Maum Gyeongbu Line	Okcheon towards Busan
Jochiwon towards Jecheon	ITX-Maum Chungbuk Line	Terminus
Sintanjin towards Seoul	Mugunghwa-ho Gyeongbu Line	Okcheon towards Busan
Terminus	Mugunghwa-ho Gyeongbu Line	Okcheon towards Busan
Terminus	Mugunghwa-ho Chungbuk Line	Sintanjin towards Jecheon
Okcheon towards Dongdaegu	Mugunghwa-ho Chungbuk Line	Sintanjin towards Yeongju
Cheonan towards Seoul	Chungbuk Yeongdong Gugak Wine Train	Yeongdong Terminus
Location

Daejeon station (Korean: 대전역) is on South Korea's high-speed KTX railway network, 166.6 km south of Seoul Station.

== History ==
The station opened on January 1, 1905, in the period of Korea under Japanese rule and KTX trains on the Gyeongbu Line began services on April 1, 2004. The station inspired the romantic blues ballad "Daejeon Blues" that has been preferred by musicians throughout Asia and has become a Korean classic. The melody of the song is played on the speakers of the subway trains upon arriving at Daejeon station. The station was used for the 2016 film Train to Busan.

== Services ==
Daejeon serves all KTX trains on the Gyeongbu Line. It also has express services and local services on the normal speed Gyeongbu Line. The station is served by the Daejeon Line, a short line connecting Daejeon with Seodaejeon, and also by the Daejeon Subway. Underground shopping can be found connected to Daejeon Station.

== See also ==
- Transportation in South Korea
- Korail
- KTX
- KTX-Sancheon
