= Gyeongbuk Line (1924–1945) =

Railway line in colonial Korea

Overview
- Native name: 경북선 (慶北線)
- Status: Operational (see text)
- Owner: Chōsen Railway
- Locale: North Gyeongsang
- Termini: Gimcheon; Andong
- Stations: 25

Service
- Type: Heavy rail, Regional rail Passenger/Freight
- Operator(s): Chōsen Railway

History
- Opened: 1924–1931

Technical
- Line length: 118.1 km (73.4 mi)
- Number of tracks: Single track
- Track gauge: 1,435 mm (4 ft 8 1/2 in) standard gauge

The Gyeongbuk Line (慶北線, Keihoku-sen) was a railway line of the privately owned Chōsen Railway (Chōtetsu) in colonial-era Korea, located in North Gyeongsang Province, connecting Gimcheon (on the Chōsen Government Railway's Gyeongbu Line main line) with Gyeongbuk Andong.

== History ==
Construction of the line was begun by the privately owned Chosen Industrial Railway; however, before the line was finished, that company merged with five others to create the Chosen Railway (Chōtetsu) in 1923, and it was the new company which completed the first section of the line, opening the Gimcheon–Sangju section on 1 October 1924, followed by the Sangju–Jeomchon section on 25 December. Chōtetsu then extended the line in several stages, first reaching Yecheon on 1 November 1928, then reaching Gyeongbuk Andong on 16 October 1931; however, the Jeomchon–Andong section was dismantled in 1944 to use the material elsewhere as Japan's military faced material shortages during the Pacific War.

After the Liberation of Korea, Chōtetsu was nationalised along with all other railways in the country. The Gyeonbuk Line was subsequently operated by the Korean National Railroad, retaining the name Gyeongbuk Line but extending it to Yeongju instead of rebuilding it to Andong.

== Services ==
In the November 1942 timetable, the last issued prior to the start of the Pacific War, Chōtetsu operated the following schedule of third-class-only local passenger services:

Distance (read down)	1741	1743	1745	741	1747	743	Station name	Distance (read up)	740	1742	1744	1746	742	1748
0.0	05:20	08:55	13:00	15:00	17:20	21:00	Gimcheon	118.1	07:34	10:31	13:32	15:36	18:55	23:25
36.0	06:42	10:32	14:17	16:13	18:50	22:02	Sangju	82.1	06:34	09:10	12:05	14:13	17:43	22:06
85.3	08:40	12:35	16:09	17:52	20:50	23:28	Yecheon	32.8	05:14	07:18	09:53	12:27	16:13	20:18
118.1	09:48	13:50	17:20	18:56	21:59	00:20	Gyeongbuk Andong	0.0	04:15	05:55	08:25	11:00	15:06	19:05

== Route ==
慶北線 - 경북선 - Keihoku Line - Gyeongbuk Line
Distance		Station name				
Total; km	S2S; km	Transcribed, Korean	Transcribed, Japanese	Hunminjeongeum	Hanja/Kanji	Connections
0.0	0.0	Gimcheon	Kinsen	김천	金泉	Sentetsu Gyeongbu Line
?.?	?.?	Namsan	Nanzan	남산	南山	closed 1927
7.7	?.?	Acheon	Gasen	아천	牙川	
?.?	?.?	Doam	Dōgan	도암	道岩	closed 1927
20.0	20.0	Oksan	Gyokuzan	옥산	玉山	
27.1	7.1	Cheongni	Seiri	청리	靑里	
36.0	8.9	Sangju	Shōshū	상주	尙州	
44.4	8.4	Baekwon	Hakugen	백원	白元	
47.9	3.5	Yangjeong	Yōtei	양정	楊亭	
55.8	11.4	Hamchang	Kanshō	함창	咸昌	
60.0	4.2	Jeomchon	Tenson	점촌	店村	
66.9	6.9	Yonggung	Ryūgū	용궁	龍宮	
73.3	6.3	Gaepo	Kaiho	개포	開浦	
79.7	3.0	Yucheon	Ryūsen	유천	柳川	
85.3	11.7	Yecheon	Reisen	예천	醴泉	
89.3	2.7	Gopyeong	Kōhei	고평	高坪	
94.7	5.4	Homyeong	Komei	호명	虎鳴	
100.7	6.0	Gyeongbuk Pungsan	Keihoku Hōzan	경북풍산	慶北豊山	
108.2	7.5	Myeongdong	Meitō	명동	鳴洞	
118.1	9.9	Gyeongbuk Andong	Keihoku Antō	경북안동	慶北安東	
