= Baekhwasan =

Baekhwasan (백화산; 白華山) is the name of three mountains in South Korea:

- Baekhwasan (Goesan/Mungyeong)
- Baekhwasan (Yeongdong/Sangju)
- Baekhwasan (Chungcheongnam-do)
