= Yeongdong station =

Train station in South Korea

Coordinates: 36°10′20″N 127°47′12″E

영동
Yeongdong
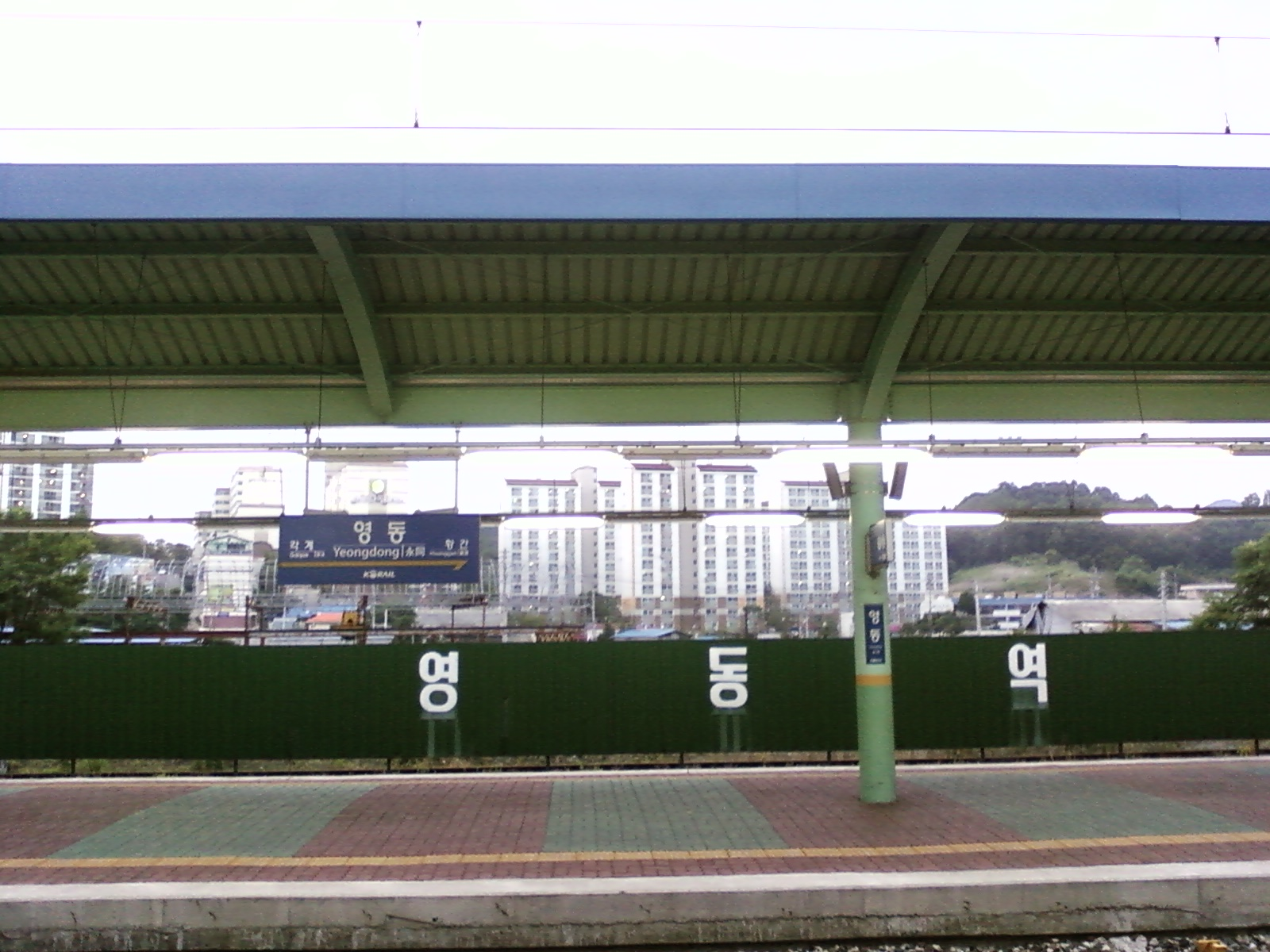

Korean name
- Hangul: 영동역
- Hanja: 永同驛
- Revised Romanization: Yeongdongyeok
- McCune–Reischauer: Yŏngdongyŏk

General information
- Location: 87 Gyesan-ro, Yeongdong-eup, Yeongdong County, North Chungcheong Province; South Korea
- Operator: Korail
- Line: Gyeongbu Line
- Platforms: 2
- Tracks: 4

Construction
- Structure type: Aboveground

History
- Opened: January 1, 1905

Services
Preceding station	Korail	Following station
Iwon towards Seoul	ITX-Saemaeul Gyeongbu Line	Hwanggan towards Busan
Daejeon towards Seoul	ITX-Maum Gyeongbu Line	Gimcheon towards Busan
Jitan towards Daejeon	ITX-Maum Gyeongbu Line via Jitan	Hwanggan towards Busan
Iwon towards Daejeon	ITX-Maum Gyeongbu Line via Iwon	Chupungnyeong towards Busan
Simcheon towards Seoul	Mugunghwa-ho Gyeongbu Line	Hwanggan towards Busan
Gakgye towards Daejeon	Mugunghwa-ho Gyeongbu Line	Hwanggan towards Busan
Hwanggan towards Dongdaegu	Mugunghwa-ho Chungbuk Line	Gakgye towards Yeongju
Daejeon towards Seoul	Chungbuk Yeongdong Gugak Wine Train	Terminus
Location

Yeongdong station is a railway station in South Korea on the Gyeongbu Line. The line attracts tourists visiting nearby vineyards.
