= Tilting Train Express =

Experimental train

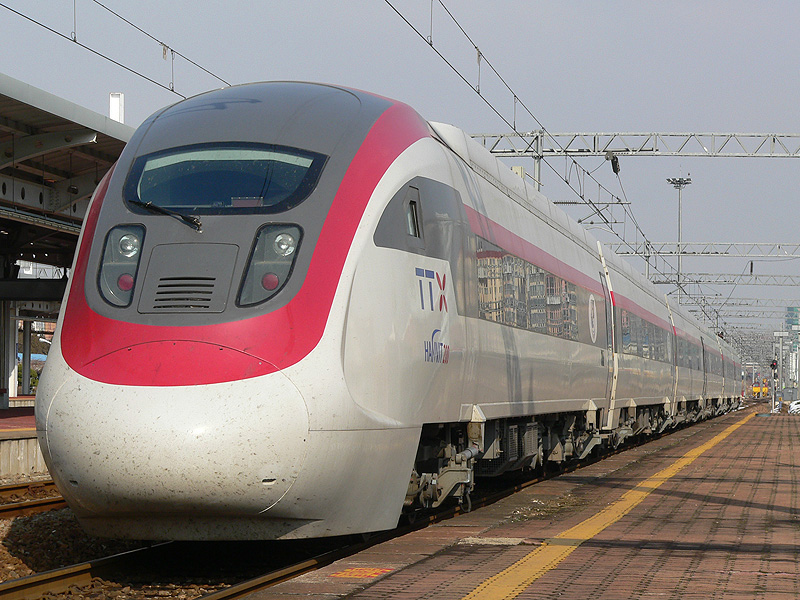
- In service: Not in service
- Manufacturer: TTX Consortium
- Built at: Hankuk Fiber
- Family name: Hanvit
- Constructed: 2007
- Number built: 1 set
- Number preserved: 2 end cars
- Formation: 2M+2T+2M
- Capacity: 278
- Operators: TTX Consortium
- Lines served: Chungbuk Line, Jungang Line

Specifications
- Car body construction: carbon/epoxy sandwiched aluminium honeycomb
- Car length: 24.50 m (80 ft 5 in)
- Width: 2.95 m (9 ft 8 in)
- Maximum speed: achieved in tests: 222 km/h (138 mph) design: 200 km/h (124 mph) planned in service: 180 km/h (112 mph)
- Weight: 344 t (379 short tons; 339 long tons)
- Power output: 16 × 250 kW (340 hp) (4,000 kW or 5,400 hp)
- Power supply: 25 kV/60 Hz AC
- Electric system(s): catenary
- Current collector(s): Single arm pantograph
- UIC classification: Bo'Bo' + Bo'Bo' + 2'2' + 2'2' + Bo'Bo' + Bo'Bo'
- Safety system(s): Automatic Train Stop and Automatic Train Protection
- Track gauge: 1,435 mm (4 ft 8 1/2 in) standard gauge

Tilting Train Express (TTX) or Hanvit 200 is a South Korean experimental tilting train, which was tested by the Korea Railroad Research Institute (KRRI).

== Technical details ==
The six-car EMU has a design speed of 200 km/h (124 mph) and a planned service speed of 180 km/h (112 mph). The carbody is made on an aluminum honeycomb structure sandwiched between a carbon/epoxy composite material, reducing carbody mass by 40%. The interior design of two of the powered cars provides for 29 First Class seats in 2+1 configuration, that of the other two powered cars 56 Standard Class seats in 2+2 configuration, that of unpowered end cars 54 Standard Class seats.

== History ==
TTX was presented to the public on January 16, 2007, when the first test run was planned for the next month. The actual first test was conducted on April 2, 2007, on the Chungbuk Line.

Following a call by Nam-Hee Chae, the president of the Korea Railroad Research Institute, for proposals for a generic name for Korean-made high-speed trains, on April 5, 2007, Chae announced the name Hanvit (Hangul: 한빛), which means a streak of intense light in Korean. Under the new naming scheme, TTX became Hanvit 200.

The first test run with active tilting was conducted in the presence of the media on May 22, 2007, between Osong Station and nearby Ogeunjang Station on the Chungbuk Line. At the time, the train was planned to enter service in 2010. Until December 21, 2008, the train ran over 20,000 km (12,000 mi) in test runs on the Chungbuk Line, short of the 100,000 km (62,000 mi) planned. The test program of 100,000 km (62,000 mi) was completed until the end of 2009, with test runs on the Chungbuk, Jungang, Honam, Gyeongbu and Taebaek Lines followed by high-speed testing on the Gyeongbu High Speed Railway (Gyeongbu HSR), with 200 km/h (124 mph) achieved at 00:33 on November 19, 2009, between Osong and Daejeon. In a further test in September 2010 on the not yet opened second stage of the line between Daegu and Busan, the train achieved 222 km/h (138 mph).

=== Canceled production version ===
By the end of 2009, the series version of the train was expected to enter regular service in 2013, starting on the Jungang Line. The future service is expected to reduce the travel time between Cheongnyangni in Seoul and Yeongju from the current Mugunghwa-ho travel time of 3 hours 25 minutes to 2 hours 55 minutes, further reducing to 1 hour 55 minutes after the upgrade of the Jungang Line. Further services are planned on the Taebaek and Yeongdong Lines.

However, it was deemed more efficient to bank and straighten conventional rails to higher speed specs, so production units were never built. The KTX-Eum took its role as the high speed service in the upgraded Jungang line, while the ITX-Maum took over services on the Taebaek and Yeongdong lines.

=== LTE-R Testing ===
Circa 2016, the TTX was modified to be an LTE-R test train for the upcoming 250kph LTE-R upgrade of the Wonju-Gangneung section of the Gyeonggang Line. The modified set has LTE-R equipment on board, as well as related branding on the sides.

=== Preservation ===
Since November 2023, car 1 the TTX is displayed in Yongsan Railroad High School to be used for training purposes.

Car 6 of the TTX is preserved in Chungnam Mechanical Technical High School for educational purposes.

== See also ==
- HSR-350x
- HEMU-430X
- Korea Train Express
- New Pendolino
- X 2000
- Transportation in South Korea
- Hankuk Fiber
