= Seowonju station =

Railway station in South Korea

서원주
Seowonju

Korean name
- Hangul: 서원주역
- Hanja: 西原州驛
- RR: Seowonju-yeok
- MR: Sŏwŏnju-yŏk

General information
- Location: Jijeong-myeon; Wonju-si, Gangwon-do, South Korea
- Coordinates: 37°20′59″N 127°50′13″E
- Operator: Korail
- Lines: Gangneung Line; Jungang Line

Key dates
- September 25, 2012: Jungang Line opened
- December 22, 2017: Gangneung Line opened (ahead of the 2018 Winter Olympics)

Services
Preceding station	Korea Train Express	Following station
Yangpyeong towards Haengsin or Seoul	Gangneung KTX	Manjong towards Donghae or Gangneung
Yangpyeong towards Seoul	Jungang KTX	Wonju towards Bujeon
Preceding station	Korail	Following station
Yangdong towards Cheongnyangni	ITX-Maum Jungang Line	Wonju towards Andong or Bujeon
Samsan towards Cheongnyangni	Mugunghwa-ho Taebaek Line	Wonju towards Donghae
Location

Seowonju station is a railway station in Jijeong-myeon, Wonju, South Korea. It is served by the Gangneung Line and Jungang Line. The station belongs to Jungang Line opened on 25 September 2012. The Gangneung Line opened on December 22, 2017, ahead of the 2018 Winter Olympics in Pyeongchang.
