= Danyang station =

Rail station in South Korea

Coordinates: 36.9731°N 128.3437°E

단양
Danyang
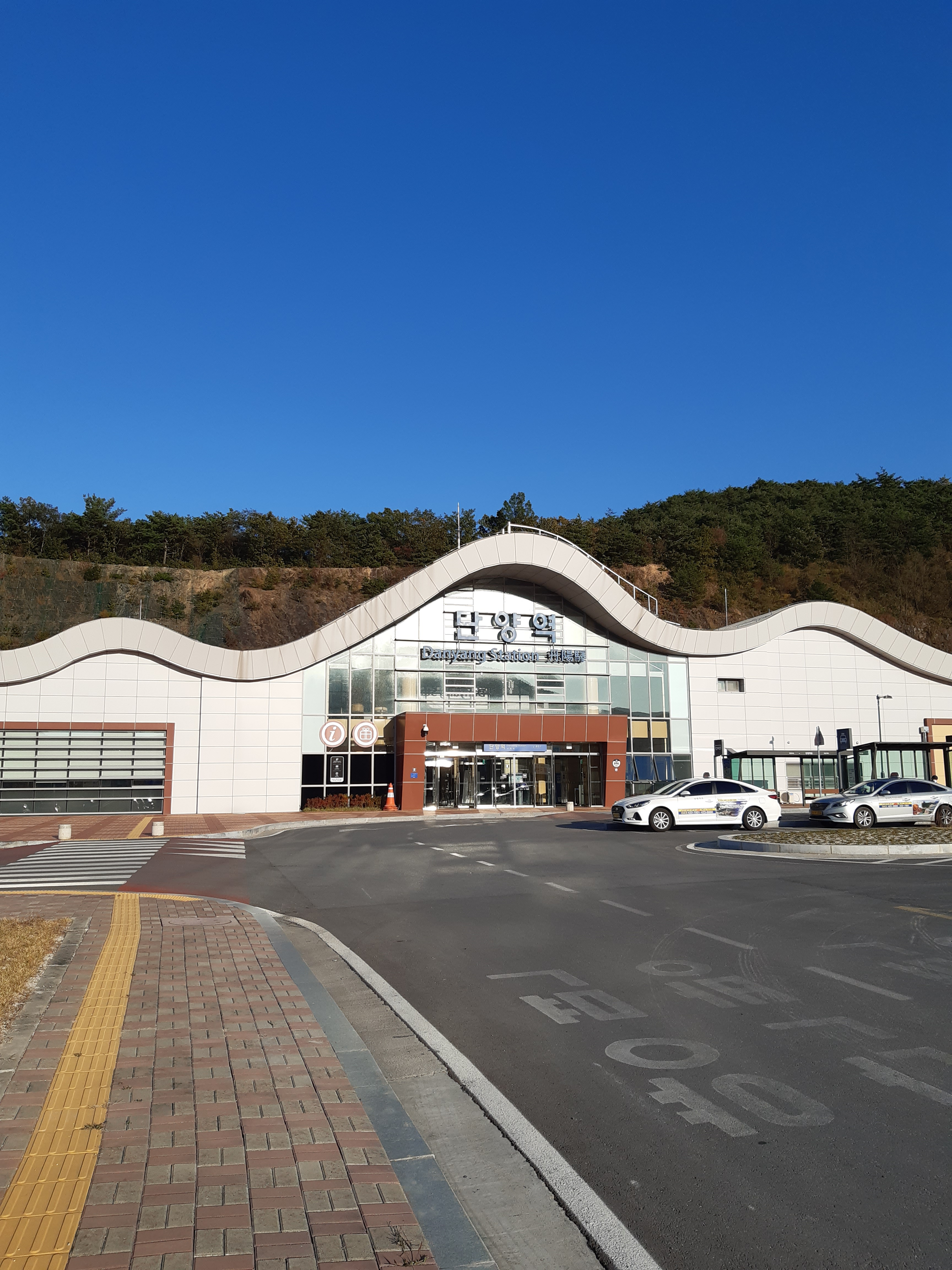

Korean name
- Hangul: 단양역
- Hanja: 丹陽驛
- Revised Romanization: Danyangyeok
- McCune–Reischauer: Tanyangyŏk

General information
- Location: 896 Danyang-ro, Danyang-eup, Danyang County, Chungcheongnam-do; South Korea
- Operator: Korail
- Line: Jungang Line
- Platforms: 2
- Tracks: 5

Construction
- Structure type: Aboveground

History
- Opened: May 1, 1985

Services
Preceding station	Korea Train Express	Following station
Jecheon towards Seoul	Jungang KTX	Punggi towards Bujeon
Preceding station	Korail	Following station
Jecheon towards Cheongnyangni	ITX-Maum Jungang Line	Punggi towards Andong or Bujeon
Location

Danyang station (Korean: 단양역) is a railway station on the Jungang Line in South Korea.
