= Hwanggan station =

Railway station in South Korea

Coordinates: 36°13′27″N 127°54′44″E

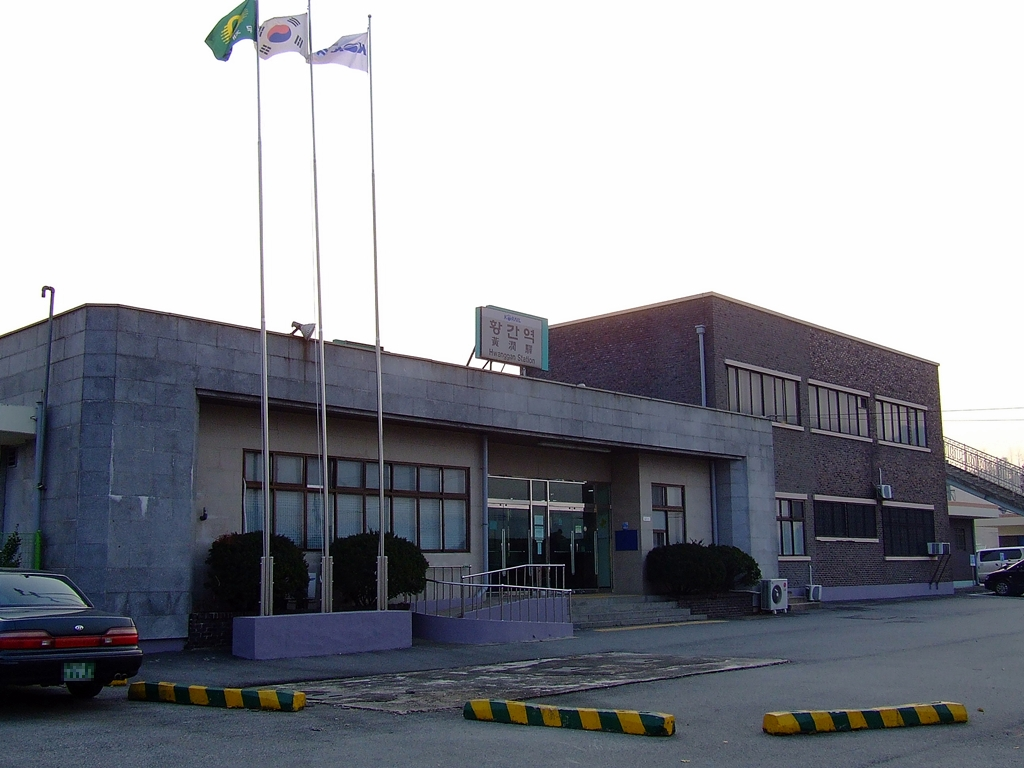
Hwanggan station in 2008

Hwanggan station is a railway station in Yeongdong County, North Chungcheong Province, South Korea. It is located on the Gyeongbu Line that runs between Seoul and Busan. The station opened on 1 January 1905, and has an average of 200 passengers per day.

The famous places around Hwanggan are Minjuji mountain, Wollyu-bong, Baekhwa mountain, Banya temple, and Mulhan Valley, which are popular places for many users. Grapes, walnuts, and persimmons are famous for their local specialties.

Preceding station	Korail	Following station
Yeongdong towards Seoul	ITX-Saemaeul Gyeongbu Line	Gimcheon towards Busan
Yeongdong towards Seoul	ITX-Maum Gyeongbu Line	Chupungnyeong towards Busan
Yeongdong towards Daejeon or Seoul	Mugunghwa-ho Gyeongbu Line	Chupungnyeong towards Busan
Chupungnyeong towards Dongdaegu	Mugunghwa-ho Chungbuk Line	Yeongdong towards Yeongju
