= Punggi station =

Rail station in South Korea

Coordinates: 36.8738°N 128.5244°E

풍기
Punggi

Korean name
- Hangul: 풍기역
- Hanja: 豊基驛
- Revised Romanization: Punggiyeok
- McCune–Reischauer: P'unggiyŏk

General information
- Location: 1 Insam-ro, Punggi-eup, Yeongju, Gyeongsangbuk-do; South Korea
- Operator: Korail
- Line: Jungang Line
- Platforms: 2
- Tracks: 4

Construction
- Structure type: Aboveground

History
- Opened: April 1, 1942

Services
| Preceding station | Korea Train Express | Following station |
|---|---|---|
| Danyang towards Seoul | Jungang KTX | Yeongju towards Bujeon |
| Preceding station | Korail | Following station |
| Danyang towards Cheongnyangni | ITX-Maum Jungang Line | Yeongju towards Andong or Bujeon |
Location

Punggi station (Korean: 풍기역) is a railway station on the Jungang Line in South Korea.
