= Jecheon station =

Railway station in the city of Jecheon, South Korea

제천
Jecheon
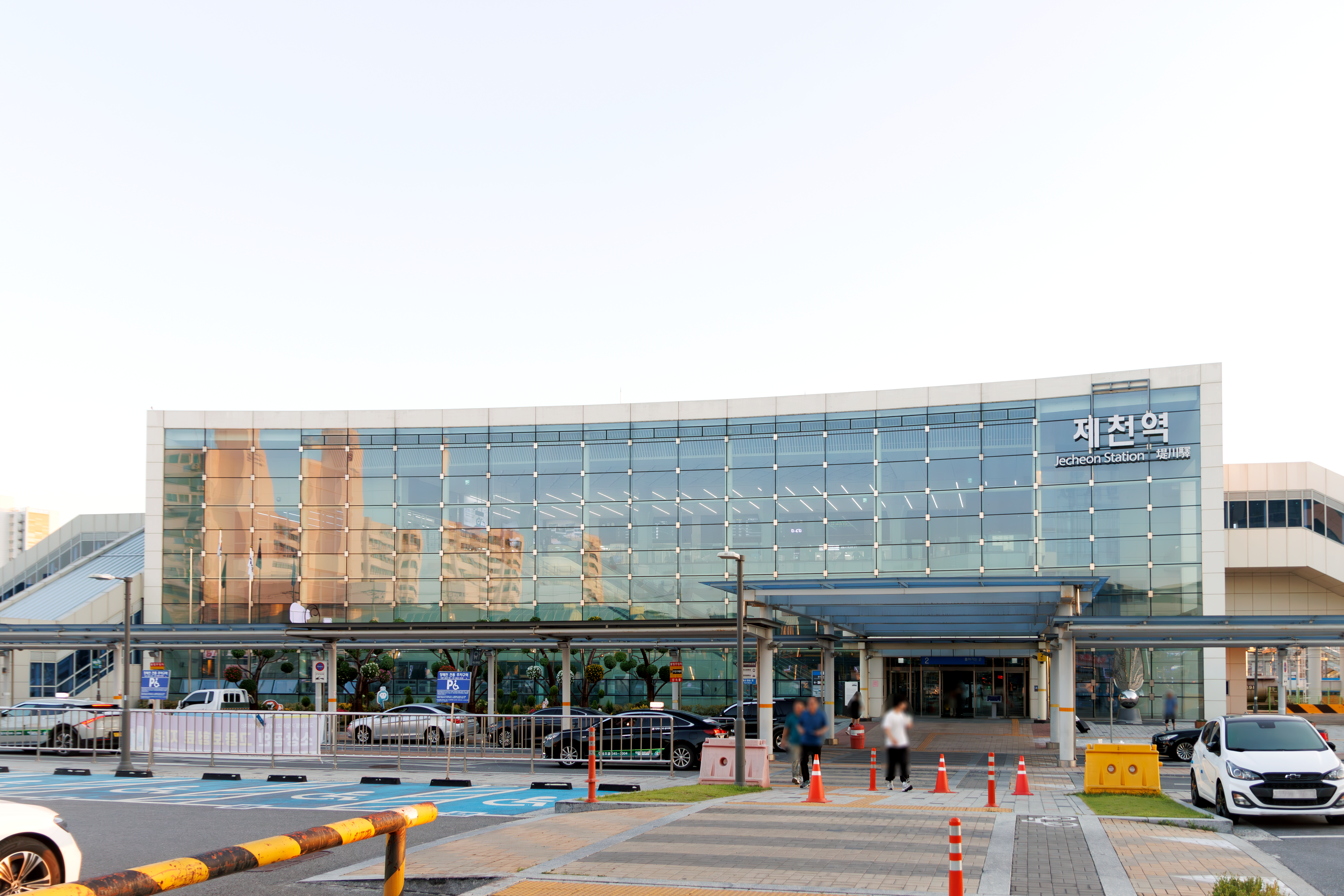
- Jecheon station

Korean name
- Hangul: 제천역
- Hanja: 堤川驛
- Revised Romanization: Jecheonnyeok
- McCune–Reischauer: Chech'ŏnnyŏk

General information
- Location: 1 Uirim-daero, Jecheon, North Chungcheong; South Korea
- Coordinates: 37°07′41″N 128°12′19″E
- Operator: Korail
- Lines: Jungang Line, Taebaek Line
- Platforms: 4
- Tracks: 6

Construction
- Structure type: Aboveground

Other information
- Station code: 092

History
- Opened: September 1, 1941

Services
Preceding station	Korea Train Express	Following station
Wonju towards Seoul	Jungang KTX	Danyang towards Bujeon
Preceding station	Korail	Following station
Wonju towards Cheongnyangni	ITX-Maum Yeongdong Line ㆍ Taebaek Line	Yeongwol towards Donghae
Wonju towards Cheongnyangni	ITX-Maum Jungang Line	Danyang towards Andong or Bujeon
Bongyang towards Seoul or Daejeon	Mugunghwa-ho Chungbuk Line	Terminus
Wonju towards Cheongnyangni	Mugunghwa-ho Taebaek Line	Ssangnyong towards Donghae
Terminus	A-Train	Yeongwol towards Auraji
Location

Jecheon station is a railway station in the city of Jecheon. It is on the Jungang Line and the Taebaek Line. This station is also served by all Chungbuk Line passenger services. Currently, passenger trains stop 56 weekdays and 58 holidays, and cargo transportation such as cement in Danyang and Yeongwol and coal in Taebaek accounts for a large proportion.

== History ==
- 1 September 1941: station opened on Gyeonggyeong Line
- 31 December 1955: Taebaek Line opened
- 31 December 1958: Chungbuk Line passenger service started
- 30 June 1973: tracks between Cheongnyangni and Jecheon are electrified
- 20 June 1974: tracks between Jecheon and Gohan are electrified
- December 1987: tracks between Jecheon and Dodam are electrified
- 1 November 1988: Saemaeul Express service started
- January 1, 2000: Changed to regional management station
- May 1, 2006: Stop handling digestibles
- 31 March 2011: electrified double track opened between Jecheon and Dodam
- November 1, 2014: ITX-Saemaul commences operation
- November 24, 2017: Transfer to temporary railway station
- May 29, 2020: Transfer to New Railway Station
- 5 January 2021: Korea Train Express service started
