= Iwon station =

Train station in South Korea

Coordinates: 36°14′38″N 127°37′05″E

이원
Iwon
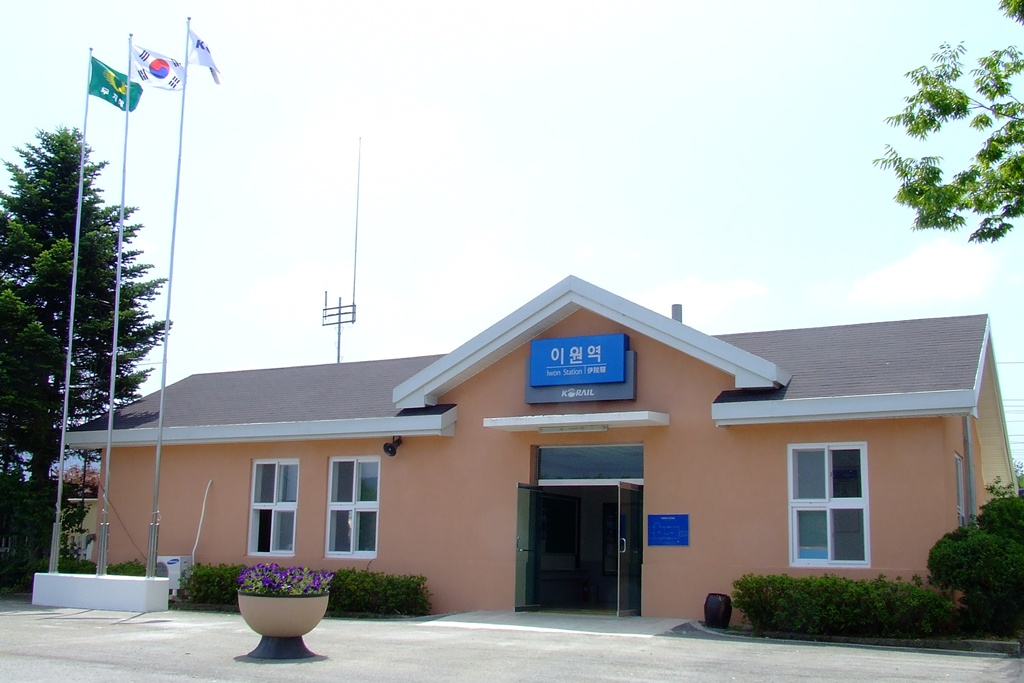

Korean name
- Hangul: 이원역
- Hanja: 伊院驛
- Revised Romanization: Iwon-yeok
- McCune–Reischauer: Iwŏn-yŏk

General information
- Platforms: 0
- Tracks: 0

Services
Preceding station	Korail	Following station
Okcheon towards Seoul	ITX-Saemaeul Gyeongbu Line	Yeongdong towards Busan
Okcheon towards Daejeon	ITX-Maum Gyeongbu Line	Yeongdong towards Busan
Okcheon towards Daejeon or Seoul	Mugunghwa-ho Gyeongbu Line	Simcheon towards Busan
Jitan towards Dongdaegu	Mugunghwa-ho Chungbuk Line	Okcheon towards Yeongju
Location

Iwon station is a railway station on the Gyeongbu Line in South Korea. It is located at Gangcheong-ri, Iwon-myeon, Okcheon-gun, Chungcheongbuk Province. The station also operates trains on an interim basis for a memorial for railroad workers who died, which is located nearby.

== History ==
- January 1, 1905: Operation started
- 1945: Moved to present location by relocation of Gyeongbu Line
- May 2007: Remodeling of station completion
- May 1, 2014: Commencement of operation of Chungbuk Connection Train
