= Jeomchon station =

Railway station in Mungyeong, South Korea

점촌
Jeomchon
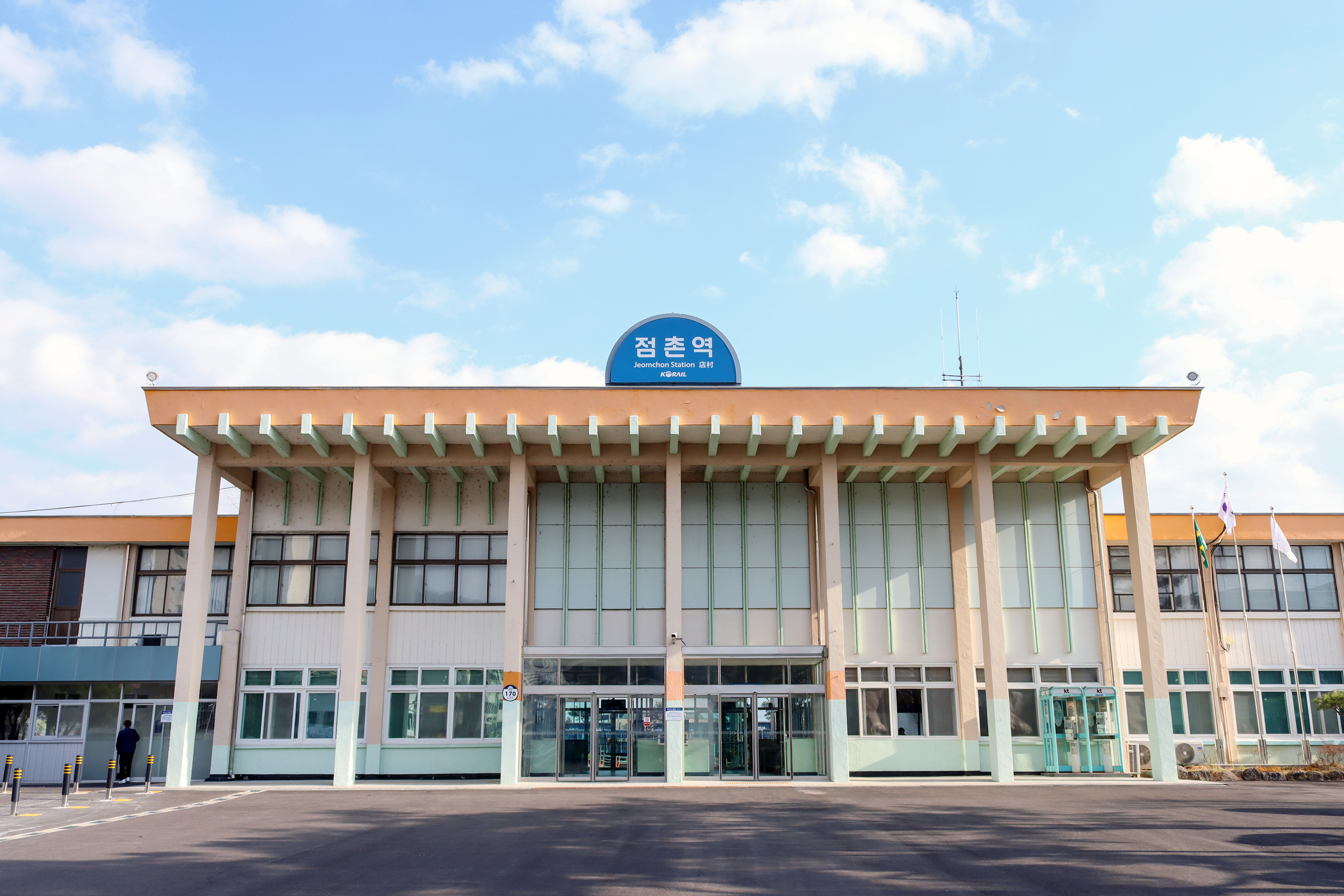

Korean name
- Hangul: 점촌역
- Hanja: 店村驛
- Revised Romanization: Jeomchonyeok
- McCune–Reischauer: Chŏmch'onyŏk

General information
- Location: 170 Sinheung-ro, Mungyeong, Gyeongsangbuk-do; South Korea
- Operator: Korail
- Line: Gyeongbuk Line
- Platforms: 2
- Tracks: 4

Construction
- Structure type: Aboveground

History
- Opened: December 25, 1924

Services
Preceding station	Korail	Following station
Yonggung towards Yeongju	Mugunghwa-ho Gyeongbuk Line	Hamchang towards Gimcheon
Location

Jeomchon Station is a railway station on the Gyeongbuk Line, Mungyeong Line in South Korea. Jungbunaeryuk Line will be extended to this station in the future.

== Origin of the station name ==
In around 1829, as many artisans who baked earthenware and tiles gathered together, Onggi-jeom and Giwa-jeom (places where they sold their wares) were established, and as the number of such places increased and the traffic of merchants grew, it came to be called "Jeomma." It originated from being called "Jeomchon" during the administrative district reorganization in 1906.
