= 백원역 =

백원역 may refer to stations:

- Baegwon Station (白元驛), railway station on the Gyeongbuk Line
- Paegwŏn Station (百源驛), railway station on the Pyongdok Line of the Korean State Railway
