= Wonju station =

Railway station in Wonju, South Korea

원주
Wonju

Korean name
- Hangul: 원주역
- Hanja: 原州驛
- Revised Romanization: Wonjuyeok
- McCune–Reischauer: Wŏnjuyŏk

General information
- Location: 1860 Bugwon-ro, Wonju, Gangwon; South Korea
- Coordinates: 37°18′58″N 127°55′18″E
- Operator: Korail
- Line: Jungang Line
- Platforms: 1
- Tracks: 6

Construction
- Structure type: Aboveground

History
- Opened: April 1, 1940

Services
Preceding station	Korea Train Express	Following station
Seowonju towards Seoul	Jungang KTX	Jecheon towards Bujeon
Preceding station	Korail	Following station
Cheongnyangni Terminus	ITX-Maum Yeongdong Line ㆍ Taebaek Line	Jecheon towards Donghae
Seowonju towards Cheongnyangni	ITX-Maum Jungang Line	Jecheon towards Andong or Bujeon
Seowonju towards Cheongnyangni	Mugunghwa-ho Taebaek Line	Jecheon towards Donghae
Location

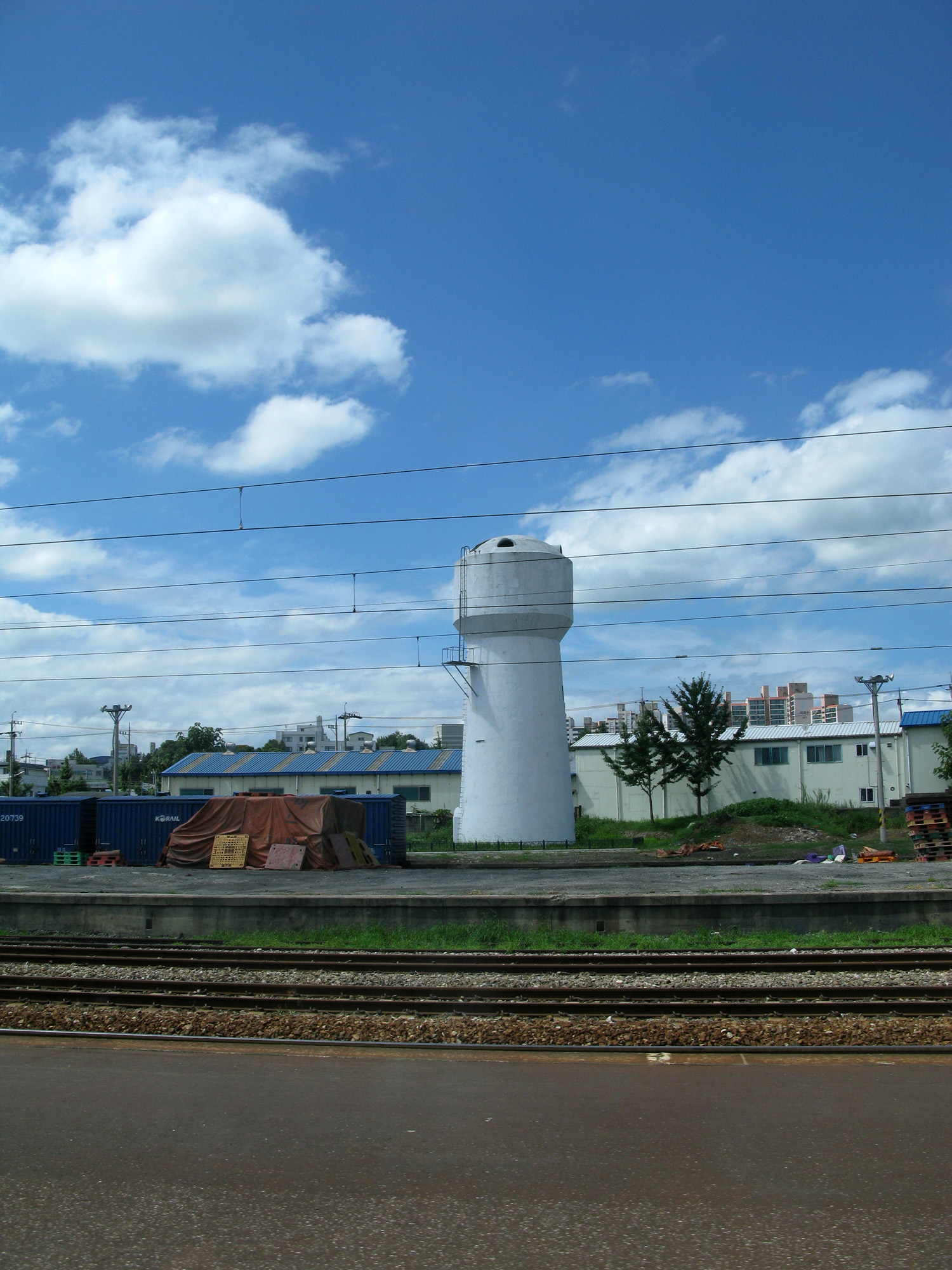
Cultural Heritage of early modern times No. 138

Wonju station is a railway station in the city of Wonju, Gangwon province, South Korea. It is on the Jungang Line.
