= Gakgye station =

Train station in South Korea

Coordinates: 36°12′29″N 127°43′32″E

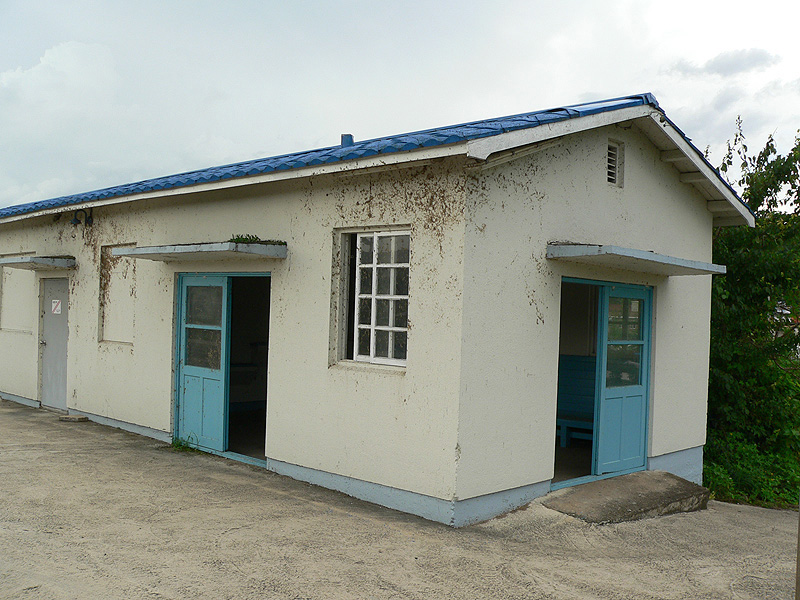
The station in 2007

Gakgye station is a railway station on the Gyeongbu Line.

Preceding station	Korail	Following station
Simcheon towards Daejeon	Mugunghwa-ho Gyeongbu Line	Yeongdong towards Busan
Yeongdong towards Dongdaegu	Mugunghwa-ho Chungbuk Line	Simcheon towards Yeongju
