= Moryang station =

Railway station

모량
Moryang

Korean name
- Hangul: 모량역
- Hanja: 牟梁驛
- RR: Moryang-yeok
- MR: Moryang-yŏk

General information
- Location: Gyeongju, North Gyeongsang; South Korea
- Operator: Korail
- Lines: Donghae Line, Jungang Line

Construction
- Structure type: Aboveground

History
- Opened: December 25, 1922
Location

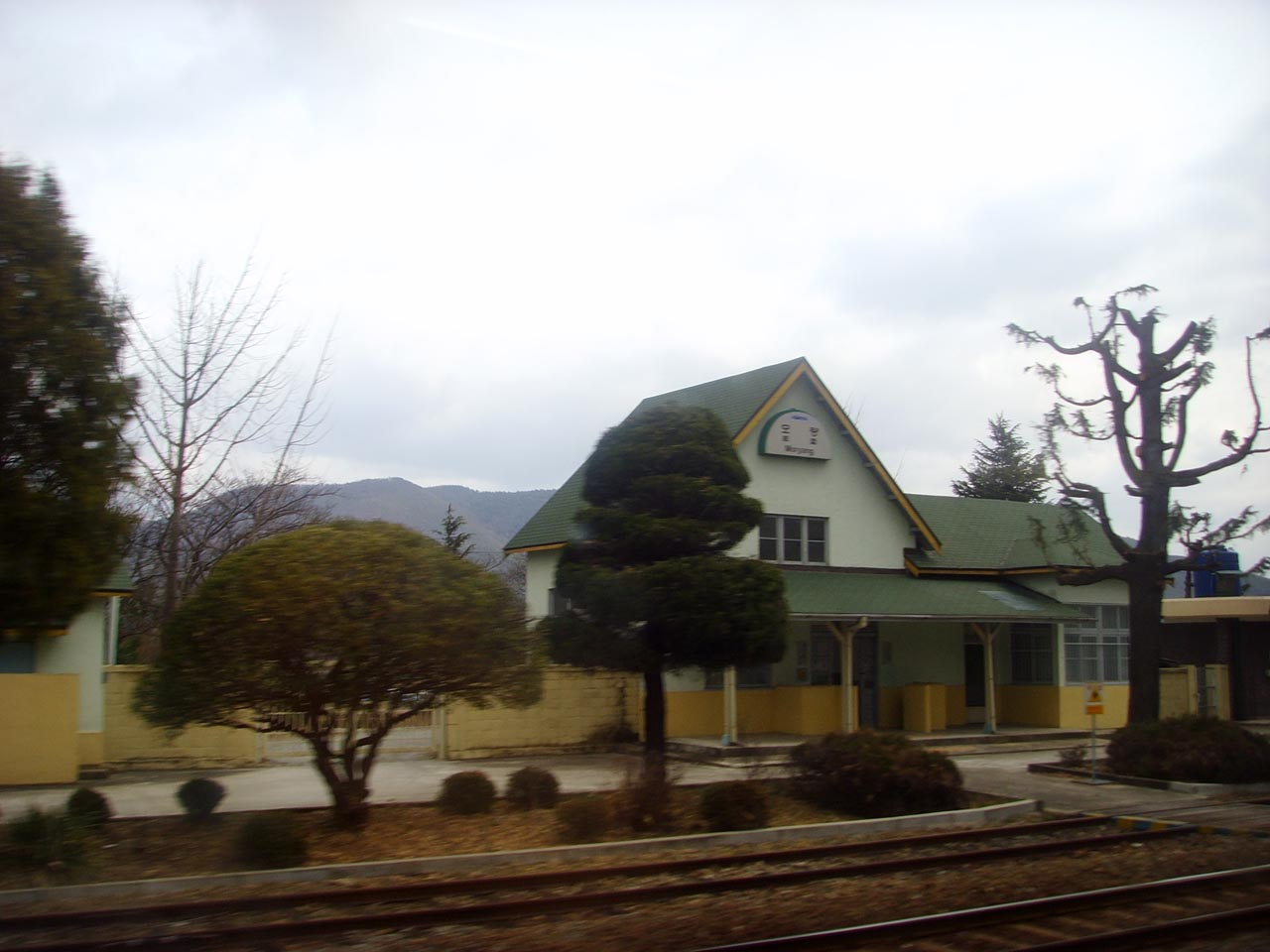
Moryang Station

Moryang station (Korean: 모량역; Hanja: 牟梁驛) is a railway station of the Donghae Line and Jungang Line in Gyeongju, North Gyeongsang Province, South Korea.

== History ==
- 25 December 1922: Started operation as Gwangmyeong Station.
- 1 June 1939: The station name was changed to Moryang Station.
- 1 July 2001: The station hanja name was changed from Moryang (毛良) to Moryang (牟梁).
- 18 December 2017: Suspension of passenger handling and downgrading to signal station.
- 28 December 2021: Donghae Line and Jungang Line was double-tracked and electrified, and moved to new station.
