= Uiseong station =

Railway station in South Korea

의성
Uiseong

Korean name
- Hangul: 의성역
- Hanja: 義城驛
- RR: Uiseong-yeok
- MR: Ŭisŏng-yŏk

General information
- Location: Hujuk-ri, Uiseong-eup, Uiseong, North Gyeongsang; South Korea
- Coordinates: 36°21′14″N 128°41′37″E
- Operator: Korail
- Line: Jungang Line

Construction
- Structure type: Aboveground

History
- Opened: March 1, 1940

Services
Preceding station	Korea Train Express	Following station
Andong towards Seoul	Jungang KTX	Yeongcheon towards Bujeon
Preceding station	Korail	Following station
Andong towards Cheongnyangni	ITX-Maum Jungang Line	Gunwi towards Bujeon
Andong towards Donghae	Mugunghwa-ho Yeongdong Line	Gunwi towards Dongdaegu
Location

Uiseong station (Korean: 의성역) is a railway station in Uiseong County, North Gyeongsang, South Korea. It is on the Jungang Line.
