= Chungbuk Yeongdong Gugak Wine Train =

South Korean tourist train

Overview
- Termini: Seoul Station; Yeongdong station

Service
- Type: Regional rail
- System: Korail
- Services: Gyeongbu Line

History
- Opened: December 1, 2006

Chungbuk Yeongdong Gugak Wine Train (Korean: 충북영동국악와인열차) is a South Korean tourist train operated by Korail.

Currently, it is operating under the name of the Yeongdong Gugak Wine Train in Chungbuk.

No. 7480 was designated as a dedicated painting locomotive and was returned to the general painting in 2024.

== Operations ==
- Started running: December 1, 2006
  - Services: Gyeongbu Line
  - Stations: Seoul Station - Yeongdong station
