= Taebaek Line =

Single-track electrified railway line in South Korea

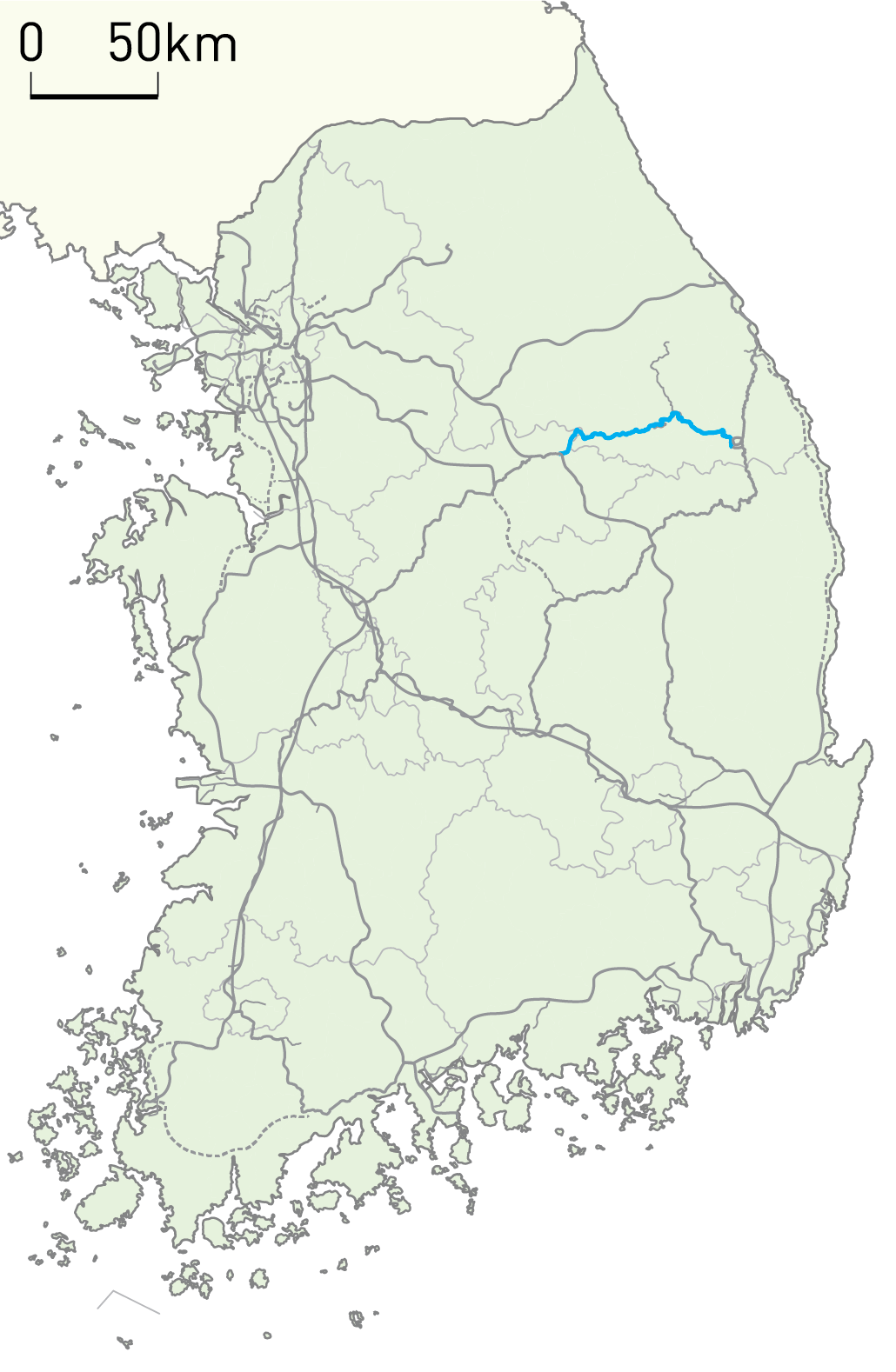

Overview
- Native name: 태백선(太白線)
- Status: Operational
- Owner: Korea Rail Network Authority
- Locale: North Chungcheong; Gangwon
- Termini: Jecheon; Baeksan
- Stations: 21

Service
- Type: Heavy rail, Passenger/Freight; Regional rail
- Operator: Korail

History
- Opened: Stages between 1955-1973

Technical
- Line length: 104.1 km (64.7 mi)
- Num of tracks: Double track(Jecheon–Ipseok-ri); Single track(Ipseok-ri–Baeksan)
- Track gauge: 1,435 mm (4 ft 8 1/2 in) standard gauge
- Electrification: 25 kV/60 Hz AC Catenary

- Taebaek Line
- Hangul: 태백선
- Hanja: 太白線
- RR: Taebaekseon
- MR: T'aebaeksŏn

Taebaek Line is a single-track electrified railway mainline connecting Jecheon station to Baeksan station in South Korea. At its two ends, the Taebaek Line connects to the Jungang Line and Yeongdong Line. The line was originally two spur lines, which were built across difficult mountainous terrain in stages, before a connection was built. The line includes the steepest section of the South Korean network, a short parallel line that is operated as a second track on the section includes South Korea's longest spiral tunnel. The centerpiece of the last-built section west of Taebaek, is a tunnel that was the longest in South Korea at the time of its construction, and Chujeon Station at the eastern end of the tunnel is the highest altitude in South Korea at 855 m (2,805 ft). In passenger traffic, the line is served by cross-country passenger trains connecting the capital Seoul with Korea's east coast. In freight traffic, while coal transport declined, the line carries significant cement transport. In the winter, regular special trains take tourists along the scenic route.

== History ==
This line was originally planned by the privately owned Chosen Railway as an extension of its Chungbuk Line; however, the end of Japanese rule in Korea led to this plan being abandoned for many years. In 1949, the Economic Cooperation Administration, the United States government agency administering the Marshall Plan, also launched a plan to revive South Korea's economy, which included the construction of new railway lines. One new line under the plan was a 60.4 km (37.5 mi) line from Jecheon to the coal mines around Yeongwol and Hambaek to the east. Construction started in August 1949, but was interrupted by the Korean War in 1950, work resumed in October 1952. The Jecheon–Yeongwol section, with an original length of 38.1 km (23.7 mi), went into service as the Yeongwol Line on December 30, 1955. On March 9, 1957, the line was extended by 22.6 km (14.0 mi) to Hambaek, and was renamed the Hambaek Line.

Following the 1961 coup, the Supreme Council for National Reconstruction started South Korea's first five-year plan, which included a construction program to complete the railway network, to foster economic growth. One of the first lines completed under the plan was the Hwangji Branchline, which would later become the eastern end of the Taebaek Line. The 9.0 km (5.6 mi) long spur from Baeksan on the Cheoram Line (today the Yeongdong Line) to Hwangji (renamed Taebaek in 1984) opened on December 20, 1962. Another project under the five-year plan was a 41.6 km (25.8 mi) railway between Yemi on the Hambaek Line and Jeongseon. The section climbing the mountains around Hambaek to Jeongsan (renamed Mindungsan in 2009), which would later become part of the Taebaek Line, was completed on December 19, 1966, and the entire railway from Jecheon to Jeongseon was renamed the Jeongseon Line, with the short Yemi–Hambaek branch retaining the Hambaek Line name. A 1,147 m (3,763 ft) long track section on the climb after Yemi is the steepest on South Korea's network at 30.3‰. Also on December 19, 1966, a 10.7 km (6.6 mi) branch from Jeongsan to Gohan opened as the Gohan Line, which would also become part of the future Taebaek Line. The Jeongseon Line was completed to Jeongseon on January 20, 1967; this section and its later extensions form the present-day Jeongseon Line.

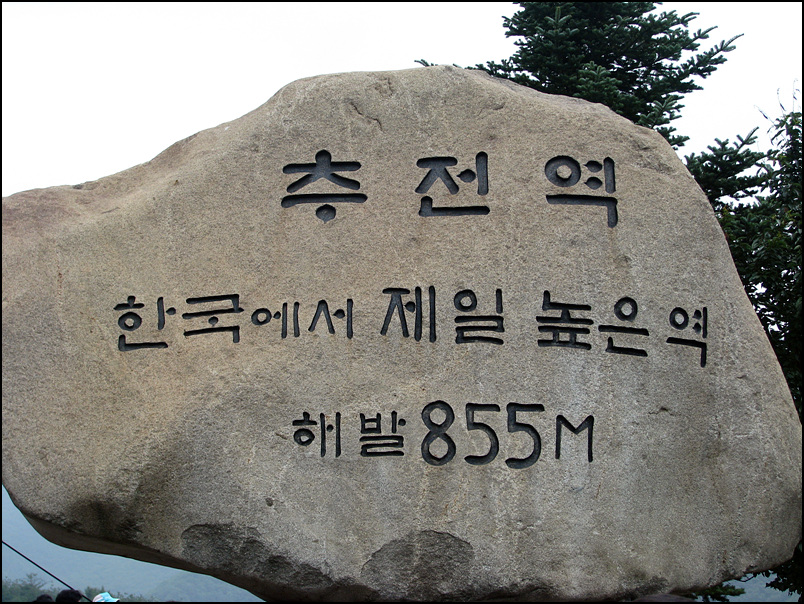
Monument at Chujeon Station marking it as the highest-altitude station on the South Korean network.

The 15.0 km (9.3 mi) long gap between the Gohan and Hwangji branch lines was plugged on October 16, 1973, when the entire railway from Jecheon to the junction with the Yeongdong Line at Baeksan was renamed the Taebaek Line. The centerpiece of the last section was the 4,505 m (14,780 ft) long Jeongam Tunnel, which was the longest in South Korea before the opening of longer tunnels on the Jeolla Line and the Gyeongbu High Speed Railway, and Chujeon Station at the eastern end of the tunnel is the one on the highest altitude in South Korea at 855 m (2,805 ft) above the sea.

=== Upgrade ===
The line was among the first foreseen for electrification with the 25 kV/60 Hz system in South Korea. Works started in 1972, already before the Taebaek Line was completed and officially renamed. The first trial run under the new voltage system in South Korea was conducted with a Class 8000 electric locomotive on the Jeongsan–Gohan section, then called the Gohan Line, on June 9, 1972. Regular electric service started on the 80.1 km (49.8 mi) long Jecheon–Gohan section on June 20, 1974. The rest of the line was electrified together with the section of the connecting Yeongdong Line until Donghae on the east coast, altogether 85.5 km (53.1 mi), on December 5, 1975. At the same time, the Taebaek Triangle Line, a 0.8 km (0.50 mi) connection built for trains from Jecheon to Donghae to run without reversal at Baeksan, was also put in service.

To improve traffic on the steep climb from Yemi to Jodong, the Hambaek Line was extended to Jodong to provide a second track. The altitude difference was mastered with a spiral tunnel, the Hambaek 1 Tunnel, which was South Korea's longest spiral tunnel at 2,450 m (8,038 ft). The altogether 4.2 km (2.6 mi) long Hambaek–Jodok link was completed on December 30, 1976. The electrification of altogether 15.9 km (9.9 mi) around the Hambaek Line went into service on April 1, 1977.

In September 2006, the construction of a 14.3km double-track railway between Jecheon and Ipseok-ri began to cope with the increasing amount of cement transport. The project, which has been under construction for seven years, cost 387.4 billion won and opened on November 14, 2013.

== Operation ==
For passenger transportation, the Taebaek Line is operated by Mugunghwa-ho. According to the timetable, which is effective from Sept. 26, 2024, it will run about five round trips along the entire route from Monday to Sunday, with travel time ranging from 1 hour 42 minutes to 1 hour 44 minutes depending on the number of stops. Only four round trips will reach the Taebaek Line by connecting Cheongnyangni Station in the capital Seoul with Donghae station on the east coast of Korea. The Cheongnyangni-Taebaek travel time ranges from 3 hours 16 minutes to 3 hours 42 minutes depending on the number of stops.

The Jecheon–Mindungsan section is also served by two pairs of daily trains running between Jecheon and Auraji on the Jeongseon Line. On every 2nd, 7th, 12th, 17th, 22nd and 27th day of the month, one of these train pairs is extended to run between Cheongnyangni and Auraji as the "Jeongseon 5-Day Market Train", to transport passengers to and from the Jeongseon 5-Day Market.

In 1998, Korean National Railroad (today Korail) introduced special tourist trains operating in the winter months, identified by a snowflake decoration, which enjoyed great popularity. Most of these trains also traverse the Taebaek Line. By the 2009/2010 season, the offer expanded to a dozen different tour packages, including trips to single destinations combined with local excursions, as well as round trips in the Taebaek Mountains along the Jungang, Taebaek, Jeongseon and Yeongdong Lines.

According to Korail's plans in 2009, travel times on the Taebaek Line are to be reduced after 2013 with the future series version of the Tilting Train Express. However, the deployment of the Tilting Train Express was canceled, and from September 1, 2023, a new train called ITX-MAUM was replaced by a one-way round trip.

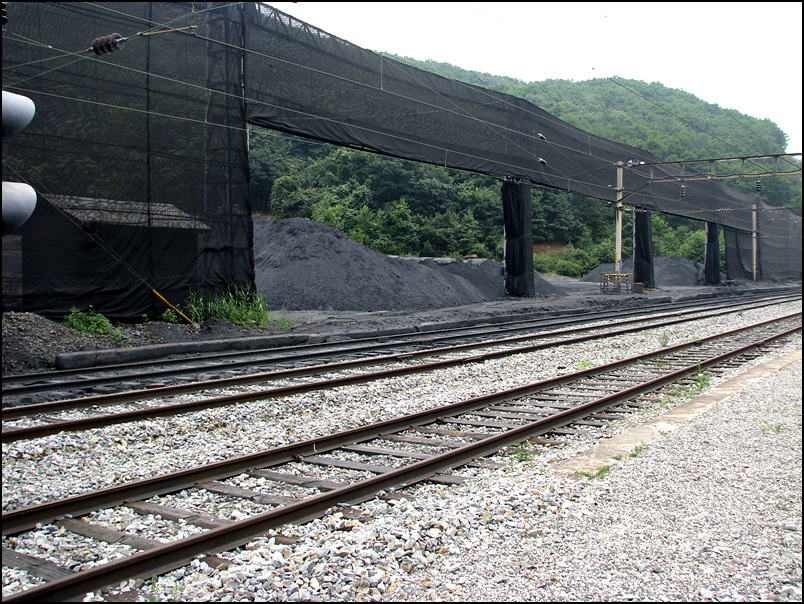
The coal yard in Chujeon Station in 2007.

The line is also carries significant freight transport. The line was originally built primarily to serve coal mines along it, but coal transport declined in the nineties when the government rationalised the coal industry and closed down mines in the region. In the 2000s, cement transport from Ssangyong brings significant freight traffic to the line.

July 22, 2014, two passenger trains collided head-on between Taebaek and Mungok stations, killing one person and injuring 92 others. It was suspected that one of them missed a traffic signal. The accident occurred on a single-track railway and a tourist train was supposed to have temporarily stopped to let a commuter train leave.

== Major stations ==
- Jecheon: a junction with the Jungang Line and the Chungbuk Line.
- Yeongwol
- Yemi: the valley terminus of Hambaek Line
- Jodong: the mountain terminus of Hambaek Line
- Mindungsan (formerly Jeungsan): the terminus of Jeongseon Line
- Sabuk: Kangwon Land
- Gohan
- Taebaek
- Baeksan: the junction with the Yeongdong Line.

== See also ==
- Transportation in South Korea
- Korail
