= Gyeongbuk Line =

Railway line in Seoul, South Korea

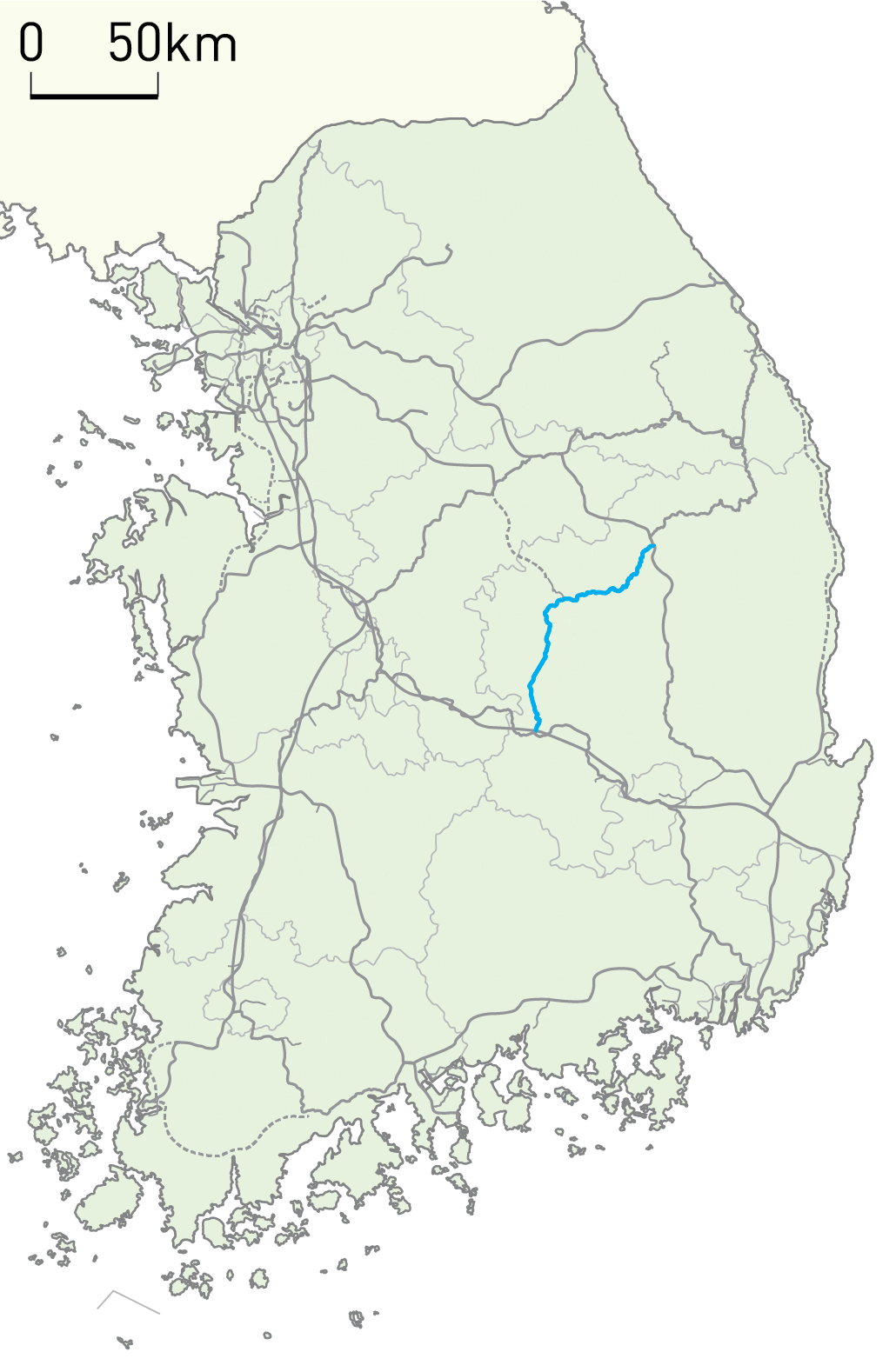

Overview
- Native name: 경북선(慶北線)
- Status: Operational
- Owner: Korea Rail Network Authority
- Locale: North Gyeongsang
- Termini: Gimcheon; Yeongju
- Stations: 12

Service
- Type: Heavy rail, Passenger/freight rail Regional rail
- Operator(s): Korail

History
- Opened: Stages between 1924 - 1966

Technical
- Line length: 115.2 km (71.6 mi)
- Number of tracks: Single track
- Track gauge: 1,435 mm (4 ft 8 1/2 in) standard gauge

- Gyeongbuk Line
- Hangul: 경북선
- Hanja: 慶北線
- RR: Gyeongbukseon
- MR: Kyŏngbuksŏn

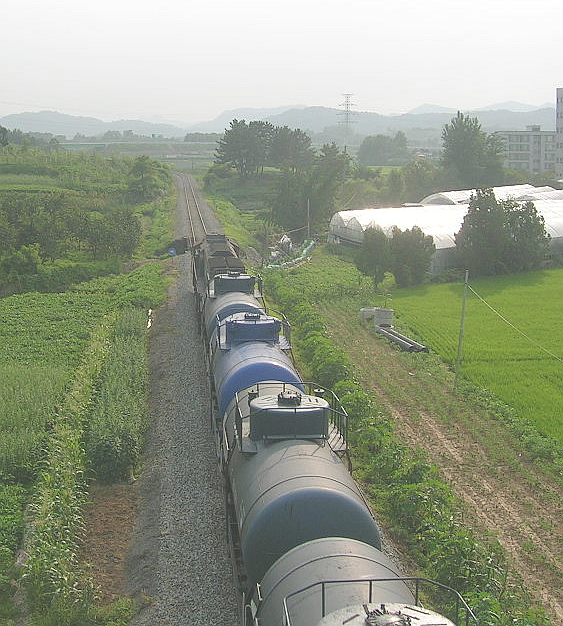
Southbound freight on the Gyeongbuk Line, south of Jeomchon Station

The Gyeongbuk Line (Korean: 경북선) is a railway line serving North Gyeongsang Province in South Korea. The line runs from Gimcheon on the Gyeongbu Line via Sangju, Jeomchon (junction with the Mungyeong Line), and Yecheon to Yeongju on the Jungang Line.

== History ==
Construction of the line was begun by the privately owned Chosen Industrial Railway; however, before the line was finished, that company merged with five others to create the Chosen Railway (Chōtetsu) in 1923, and it was the new company which completed the first section of the line, opening the Gimcheon–Sangju section on 1 October 1924, followed by the Sangju–Jeomchon section on 25 December. Chōtetsu then extended the line in several stages, first reaching Yecheon on 1 November 1928, then reaching Gyeongbuk Andong on 16 October 1931; however, the latter section was dismantled in 1944 to use the material elsewhere as Japan's military faced material shortages during the Pacific War. After the Liberation of Korea, the Chosen Railway was nationalised along with all other railways in the country.

Following the 1961 coup, the Supreme Council for National Reconstruction started South Korea's first five-year plan, which included a construction program to complete the railway network, to foster economic growth. Under the program, the Gyeongbuk Line was extended to Yeongju, to create a connection both with the Jungang Line and the Yeongdong Line, allowing the transport of coal from the latter. Work began in May 1962, the 28.9 km (18.0 mi) from Jeomchon to Yecheon was opened in January 1966, the 29.7 km (18.5 mi) from Yecheon to Yeongju was opened on 10 October 1966. The complete line is 115.2 km (71.6 mi) long, and remains single-tracked and unelectrified.

A 22.3 km (13.9 mi) long branch from Jeomchon to Mungyeong, the Mungyeong Line, was opened on 10 May 1969.

== Operation ==
As of 2010, the line is served by both passenger and freight trains along its entire length, as is the Mungyeong branch. As of November 2010, the line is served by Mugunghwa cross-country trains from Busan and Dongdaegu, which travel in 2 hours 12 minutes from Gimcheon to Yeongju.

== Route ==
Station	Hangul	Hanja	Connecting lines	Station distance	Line distance
Gimcheon	김천	金泉	Gyeongbu Line	0.0	0.0
~~Acheon~~	아천	牙川	closed 1994	7.7	~~7.7~~
~~Duwon~~	두원	杜院	closed 2006	5.1	~~12.8~~
Oksan	옥산	玉山		20.0	20.0
Cheongni	청리	靑里		7.1	27.1
Sangju	상주	尙州		8.9	36.0
Baekwon	백원	白元		8.4	44.4
~~Yangjeong~~	양정	楊亭	closed 2006	3.5	~~47.9~~
Hamchang	함창	咸昌		11.4	55.8
Jeomchon	점촌	店村	Mungyeong Line	4.2	60.0
~~Sanyang~~	산양	山陽	closed 2001	5.4	~~65.4~~
Yonggung	용궁	龍宮		6.9	66.9
~~Songam~~	송암	松岩	closed 1974	2.7	~~69.6~~
Gaepo	개포	開浦		6.4	73.3
~~Yulhyeon~~	율현	栗峴	closed 2001	3.4	~~76.7~~
~~Gadong~~	가동	佳洞	closed 2001	3.0	~~79.7~~
Yecheon	예천	醴泉		11.7	85.0
~~Dongyecheon~~	동예천	東醴泉	closed 1974	1.6	~~86.6~~
~~Gopyeong~~	고평	高坪	closed 2001 former Gyeongbuk Line	2.7	~~89.3~~
~~Misan~~	미산	眉山	closed 2001	4.5	~~93.8~~
~~Bomun~~	보문	普門	closed 2001	1.3	~~95.1~~
~~Jangsan~~	장산	獐山	closed 1974	3.2	~~98.3~~
Eodeung	어등	魚登		16.4	101.4
~~Miryong~~	미룡	美龍	closed 2001	4.0	~~105.6~~
~~Bangu~~	반구	盤邱	closed 2001	2.7	~~108.3~~
Yeongju	영주	榮州	Jungang Line; Yeongdong Line	13.6	115.0

== See also ==
- Korail
