= HSR-350x =

South Korean experimental high-speed train

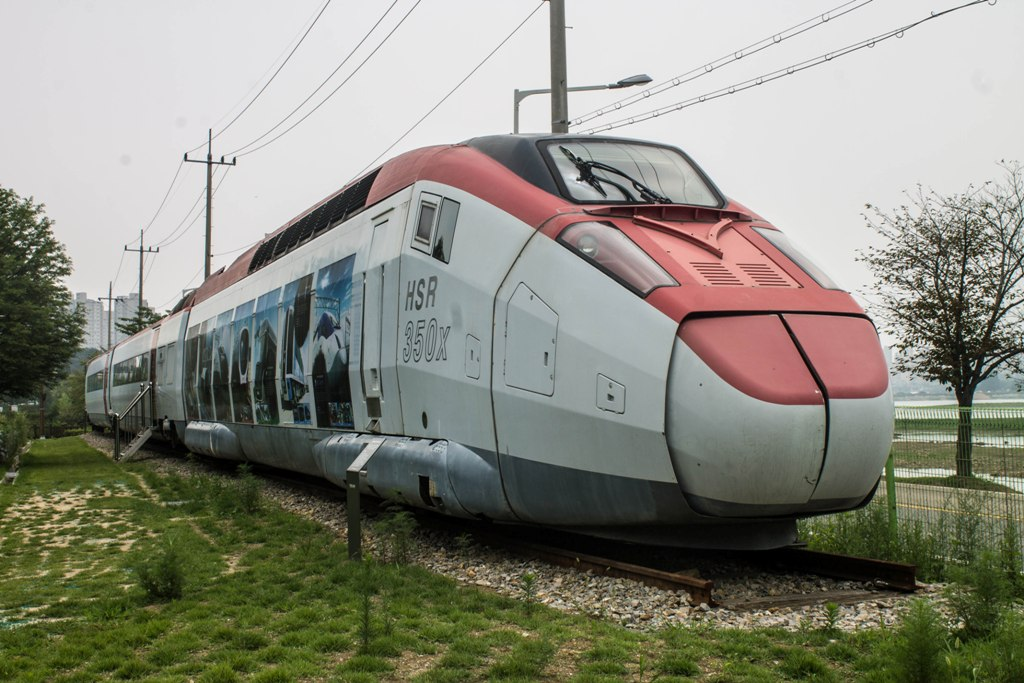
- The first three cars of HSR-350x on static display in Uiwang in July 2015
- In service: 2002–2008
- Manufacturer: Rotem
- Family name: KTX
- Constructed: 1996–2002
- Number built: 1
- Number in service: 0
- Formation: P+M+3T+M'+P: P: power car (traction head); M: motorized trailer (passenger car with one bogie powered); M': motorized trailer intended for the middle of the commercial version (passenger car with one bogie powered); T: trailer (passenger car)
- Operator: KRRI
- Depot: Osong
- Line served: Gyeongbu HSR

Specifications
- Car body construction: traction heads: steel passenger cars: aluminum
- Train length: 145.17 m (476 ft 3 3/8 in)
- Car length: traction heads: 22.690 m (74 ft 5 1/4 in) powered passenger cars: 21.845 m (71 ft 8 in) unpowered passenger cars: 18.700 m (61 ft 4 1/4 in)
- Width: traction heads: 2.814 m (9 ft 2 3/4 in) passenger cars: 2.970 m (9 ft 8 7/8 in)
- Height: powered cars: 4.055 m (13 ft 3.6 in) unpowered passenger cars: 3.690 m (12 ft 1 1/4 in)
- Floor height: 1,212 mm (3 ft 11 3/4 in)
- Maximum speed: achieved in tests: 352.4 km/h (219.0 mph) planned in tests/design: 385 km/h (239 mph) planned in service: 350 km/h (217 mph)
- Weight: empty: 310 t (305 long tons; 342 short tons) loaded: 332 t (327 long tons; 366 short tons) adhesive weight: 204 t (201 long tons; 225 short tons)
- Axle load: max. 17 t (16.7 long tons; 18.7 short tons)
- Traction system: 12 three-phase asynchronous induction motor HRTM-ILE-1100; 6 IGCT-based VVVF inverters (1 per bogie)
- Power output: 12 x 1,100 kW (1,500 hp) total 13,200 kW (17,700 hp)
- Auxiliaries: 1.4 MW (1,900 hp)+0.7 MW (940 hp), supplying 670 V DC
- Electric system: 25 kV/60 Hz AC catenary
- Current collection: pantograph (single-arm)
- UIC classification: Bo'Bo' + Bo'(2)(2)(2)(2)Bo' + Bo'Bo'
- Bogies: Jacobs bogies between intermediate cars
- Braking systems: 6 x regenerative, rheostatic (1 per inverter); 8 x wheel tread (1 per traction head axle); 4 x wheel disc (1 per powered passenger car axle); 24 x disc (3 per unpowered axle); 4 x eddy current (1 per unpowered bogie)
- Safety systems: TVM 430 (ATC), ATS
- Coupling system: Scharfenberg (emergency)
- Multiple working: -
- Track gauge: 1,435 mm (4 ft 8 1/2 in) standard gauge

HSR-350x, alternatively called G7, KHST or NG-KTX, was a South Korean experimental high-speed train. It was developed and built in a joint project of government research institutes, universities and private companies that started in 1996, which aimed to reduce import dependence in high-speed rail technology. New components developed for the HSR-350x included motors, electronics, and the carbody of passenger cars. Test runs were conducted between 2002 and 2008. The experimental train achieved the South Korean rail speed record of 352.4 km/h (219.0 mph) in 2004. The HSR-350x was the basis for Korail's KTX-II (KTX-Sancheon) commercial high-speed trains.

== History ==
When South Korea started its high-speed rail project, rolling stock and infrastructure was built in the framework of a technology transfer agreement between GEC-Alsthom (today Alstom), the main maker of French TGV high-speed trains, and South Korean companies. The first trains for Korea Train Express service, the KTX-I, were derived from the TGV Réseau, and built both by Alstom and Rotem (today Hyundai Rotem).

=== The G7 project ===
The technology transfer agreement did not provide for a complete control of manufacturing processes, and construction involved the import of parts. To increase the domestic added value, and to further improve the technology, in December 1996, South Korea's Ministry of Construction and Transportation (MOCT) started a project named G7 to develop domestic high-speed rail technology. The project involved 10 government research agencies, 16 universities and 35 private companies, and employed over a thousand people. The main partners were the Korea Railroad Research Institute (KRRI), the Korea Institute of Industrial Technology (KITECH), and rolling stock manufacturer Rotem.

Due to the strong interdependencies of vehicle and infrastructure parameters in high-speed rail technology, the G7 program first focused on the compatibility with other components like track, catenary, signalling, and train control. Sub-projects dealt with bridge design, improved pantograph design, and catenary in tunnels. Technologies used in high-speed line construction, including rails and catenary in tunnels, were adapted for use in conventional line upgrades, to enable the operation of KTX trains on such lines. The program also dealt with problems discovered during the operation of KTX-I trains, including a snaking movement of the articulated train around a speed of 150 km/h (93 mph) in winter, which was addressed by increasing wheel conicity.

The main element of the G7 project was the experimental high-speed train HSR-350x, developed on the basis of the technology transferred from GEC-Alsthom. With a design speed of 385 km/h (239 mph), the vehicle was meant as a prototype for commercial trains with a regular service top speed of 350 km/h (217 mph). The basic design and main components, as well as a mock-up of the initial design of the nose, was presented on December 17, 1999.

The costs of the G7 program were 210 billion won, or about US$208 million. Including testing, the entire development program cost 256.9 billion won.

=== Test runs ===
The first running tests with HSR-350x were conducted in May 2002 up to a speed of 60 km/h (37 mph). The vehicle was then transported to Osong depot, on the finished test section of the Gyeongbu High Speed Railway (Gyeongbu HSR) between Cheonan-Asan and Daejeon, on June 28, 2002, and the first test run took place on August 19, 2002, with a top speed of 80 km/h (50 mph). In the first twelve months, the train covered 6,075 km (3,775 mi) in 44 test runs as top speed was increased in increments of 10 km/h (6 mph), until 301.9 km/h (187.6 mph) was achieved at 23:38 on August 1, 2003.

Further progress with the testing programme was slow, because line capacity on the finished test section of the Gyeongbu HSR was limited due to the priority of the commissioning tests of the KTX-I trains. After the launch of regular service on April 1, 2004, the Korea Rail Network Authority allowed test runs only in the night hours when there was no regular service on the line. The programme was also marred by technical problems, including a slip control problem which led to wheel abrasion, burned motor blocks, signalling troubles, braking system problems, and power car roll which led to the replacement of the suspension system. After test runs focusing on reliability, 310 km/h (193 mph) was passed on May 6, 2004, 324 km/h (201 mph) was reached on June 29, 2004.

On the night from October 27 to 28, 2004, the South Korean rail speed record was pushed to 333.3 km/h (207.1 mph). Next, 343.5 km/h (213.4 mph) was achieved at 01:53 on November 23, 2004, between Gwangmyeong and Sintanjin. The final test run to surpass the originally planned service speed was conducted on the night from December 15 to 16, 2004, between Cheonan-Asan Station and Osong Depot, when the lasting South Korean rail speed record of 352.4 km/h (219.0 mph) was achieved at 01:24 on December 16, 2004.

After the incremental speed runs, on February 2, 2005, a Test Team was established, to conduct intense reliability testing by shadow running at 300 km/h (186 mph) in timetable slots between regular trains. By June 2005, the train accumulated a mileage of 93,000 km (58,000 mi) in 209 test runs. In these tests, the ride comfort, running safety and current collection of the vehicle were evaluated according to European standards. The original test program was officially concluded on December 27, 2007, after the train ran more than 200,000 km (120,000 mi) at a cost of 46.9 billion won. The train was used for some more tests next year, and by February 2008, it ran a cumulative 207,000 km (129,000 mi).

=== Naming ===
The high-speed rail development project name G7 was an allusion to the Group of Seven, underlining South Korea's ambition to pull level with the most advanced industrialised nations in the field of technology. In the planning phase, the developed high-speed train itself was referred to by various names, including the project name G7, Korean High Speed Train (KHST), and Next Generation Korea Train eXpress (NG-KTX). Once completed, for international presentation, the prototype was named HSR-350x, an acronym for High Speed Rail - 350 km/h (220 mph) experimental.

In April 2006, Nam-Hee Chae, the president of KRRI, called for a generic name for Korean-made high-speed trains, one to match recognised high-speed train brand names like Shinkansen for ones made in Japan, TGV for ones made in France, and ICE for ones made in Germany. Chae argued that G7 is difficult to explain to foreigners, HSR-350x is not a proper name for series trains, and KTX is already associated with trains with technology imported from France. After collecting and discussing proposals, one year later, on April 5, 2007, Chae argued that the name Hanvit (한빛), which means a streak of intense light in Korean should be used. However, later on when commercial versions of these trains were put into operation, they were branded as KTX, as shown in the name KTX-Sancheon, and only Tilting Train Express was named Hanvit 200.

== Technical details ==
The train was developed on the basis of the transferred TGV technology. Like the KTX-I, the HSR-350x consists of traction heads with powered bogies and traction equipment at either end, and an articulated set of intermediate cars with passenger compartment in-between, with powered non-Jacobs bogies under the cars next to the traction heads.

The main new developments compared to the KTX-I are in the traction equipment and the carbody. The motors are newly developed three-phase asynchronous induction motors, rather than synchronous motors as in the KTX-I. The motors are supplied by traction converters with integrated gate-commutated thyristor (IGCT) rather than silicon-controlled rectifier (SCR) components as in the KTX-I. IGCT was the most advanced version of the Gate turn-off thyristor (GTO) used for control of high-power applications at the time, and the use of ABB-supplied IGCTs as the switching element in the rectifier and inverter modules of HSR-350x converters was a world's first in rail vehicles. However, testing found limited improvements in efficiency and noise levels, and problems with reliability. Each traction converter consists of two parallel-switched four-quadrant converters, which function as rectifier modules by converting single-phase alternating current (AC) from one main transformer winding each to direct current (DC), a 2,800 V DC intermediate circuit, one inverter module converting the DC supply to the three-phase AC supply for traction motors, an auxiliary inverter for the supply of motor and converter cooling fans, and resistors for rheostatic braking that are also connected to the DC circuit. The variable voltage variable frequency (VVVF) inverters are voltage-sourced with pulse-width modulation (PWM) control, rather than current-sourced with phase fired control (PFC) as in the KTX-I. Each converter supplies the motors on two axles of a bogie, providing for individual bogie control. New main transformers with a 15% weight reduction and a 20% power increase were also developed. The single-arm pantograph is a new development for the planned higher speed. The redesigned bogies and suspensions were tested on the roller rig of Southwest Jiaotong University in China at simulated speeds of up to 402 km/h (250 mph).

The intended commercial version of the train would have had powered passenger cars in the middle of the train, too, thus the back-end extreme passenger car of HSR-350x was built as the prototype of the middle powered passenger cars. The traction power system of this car has its own main transformer, supplied by high voltage from the first traction head, rather than the second that is next to it. The resulting asymmetry in the traction heads is used for maximising the capacity of the head end power, which supplies on-board electric equipment and measuring devices: while six of the eight windings of the main transformer on the first traction head supply traction converters and two supply a 0.7 MW (939 hp) auxiliary converter for 670 V DC head end power, in the second traction head, traction converters need only four main transformer windings and the other four windings supply a 1.4 MW (1,877 hp) auxiliary converter.

Newly developed eddy current brakes were installed on the unpowered bogies. Other components were designed for compatibility with the KTX-I, including the emergency coupler. For testing, 420 measuring points were installed throughout the train, with data acquisition concentrated in three intermediate cars.

The nose shape was designed to reduce aerodynamic drag by 15% compared to the KTX-I. The carbody of intermediate cars is made of aluminum rather than mild steel, saving about 30% in weight. Passenger car width was increased from 2,904 to 2,970 mm (114.3 to 116.9 in). The design was reviewed by Bombardier Talbot and DE-Consult from Germany and Alu-Swiss from Switzerland. For improved protection of passengers against air pressure variations during tunnel passages, the HSR-350x was equipped with an active passenger compartment pressure control system.

Following the project goal to localise design and production, 92% of the parts and 87% of the added value came from domestic manufacturers or researchers.

== Commercialisation, later developments ==
For series production, original plans foresaw the addition of four more cars to the articulated set of intermediate cars, enabling two configurations: an 11-car train consisting of two traction heads and one articulated set of nine passenger cars, and a 20-car train consisting of two traction heads and two articulated sets of nine passenger cars each. The 11-car version would have had the same power output as the HSR-350x, the 20-car version, due to the extra two powered bogies in the middle, would have had a power of 17.6 MW (23,602 hp). The 20-car version would have been 395 m (1,296 ft) long and would have offered 871 seats.

Already before the prototype was finished, in 2001, a study focusing on the needs of the less frequented Honam Line proposed a modified, modular train that allows shorter configurations by removing traction equipment from the extreme intermediate cars, while reducing top speed to 300 km/h (186 mph). Possible configurations would have been 12-car, 10-car and 8-car versions with two traction heads giving a total power of 8.8 MW (11,801 hp), another 8-car version with one traction head at one end and a driving trailer with powered end bogie at the other end giving a total power of 6.6 MW (8,851 hp), and a 6-car "mini" version with one traction head driving a power of 4.4 MW (5,900 hp). The 12-car version would have been 245 m (804 ft) long. The versions with two traction heads would have offered 500, 384 and 268 seats respectively, the versions with one traction head 323 and 207 seats. The active passenger compartment pressure control system of the HSR-350x wasn't deemed necessary for the proposed Honam high-speed train, only pressure isolation as in the KTX-I.

In July 2005, the Ministry of Construction and Transportation earmarked 80 billion won for two 10-car commercial trains for 300 km/h (186 mph), destined for planned KTX services on the Jeolla Line from 2008. In October 2005, however, Korail called competitive bids. Rotem, offering a commercial version of the HSR-350x, was chosen over Alstom as preferred bidder in December 2005, and finalised the order for 10 trains on June 6, 2006. In 2007, the order was increased by an additional nine trains, to be delivered by December 2010. In addition to the lack of a powered bogie under the extreme intermediate cars, the main differences between the KTX-II and HSR-350x designs were converters using IGBTs rather than the HSR-350x's converters with IGCTs, a new nose design, and the lack of bogie shrouding.

In 2007, another government-led project was started with the aim to build the HEMU-400X, a second experimental train with distributed traction and a planned test speed of 400 km/h (249 mph), as the basis for the development of commercial trains with a top speed of 350 km/h (217 mph).
