= Korea Institute of Industrial Technology =

South Korean research institute

Coordinates: 36.9017°N 127.2441°E

- Company type: Public
- Founded: 1989
- Headquarters: Cheonan, Republic of Korea
- Area served: Worldwide
- Website: www.kitech.re.kr

Korea Institute of Industrial Technology (KITECH) is a South Korean government research institute, established in 1989 to help develop technologies for the domestic industry, with focus on export competitiveness and SMEs.

South Korea's then Ministry of Trade, Industry and Energy (MOTIE) established the Korea Academy of Industrial Technology (KAITEC) in 1989 to strengthen the technological base of small and medium enterprises (SMEs). KAITEC was later renamed as the Korea Institute of Industrial Technology (KITECH). Following a re-organisation of government research institutes in 1999, KITECH was the largest institute grouped under the Korea Research Council for Industrial Science and Technology (ISTK), currently under the supervision of the Ministry of Knowledge Economy.

KITECH's focus is on the development and management of manufacturing technologies for SMEs. KITECH receives both government and private funding, and distributes most of its research grants to private companies. By the middle of the 1990s, KITECH's annual budget was around US$130 billion, and employed a staff of one thousand in five sub-institutes.

The institute conducted materials research into environmentally friendly manufacture of metal alloys, and sold the technology to the private sector for 28.2 billion won. It also fostered the exchange of technological know-how with foreign research institutes by creating the Global Venture Investment Center in Seoul. Together with Korea Railroad Research Institute (KRRI) and the company Rotem, KITECH developed the HSR-350x, a high-speed train with domestic technology. The institute also participated in the development of the android prototypes EveR-1 and 2.
