= Mangu Line =

Railway line

Overview
- Native name: 망우선 (忘憂線)
- Status: Operational
- Owner: Korea Rail Network Authority
- Locale: Seoul
- Termini: Mangu; Kwangwoon Univ.
- Stations: 2

Service
- Type: Heavy rail, Passenger/freight; Commuter rail
- Operator: Korail

History
- Opened: 11 January 1964

Technical
- Line length: 4.9 km (3.0 mi)
- Number of tracks: Single track
- Track gauge: 1,435 mm (4 ft 8 1/2 in) standard gauge
- Electrification: 25 kV/60 Hz (AC) Overhead lines

The Mangu Line is a railway line connecting from Mangu to Kwangwoon University on the Gyeongwon Line, called the Mangu Line, which opened on 30 December 1963. Since 4 November 2013, the rapid transit service has been through this line executed.

== See also ==
- Seoul Metropolitan Subway
- Rail transport in South Korea
- Jungang Line
