= Chupungnyeong station =

Train station in South Korea

Coordinates: 36°12′48″N 127°59′45″E

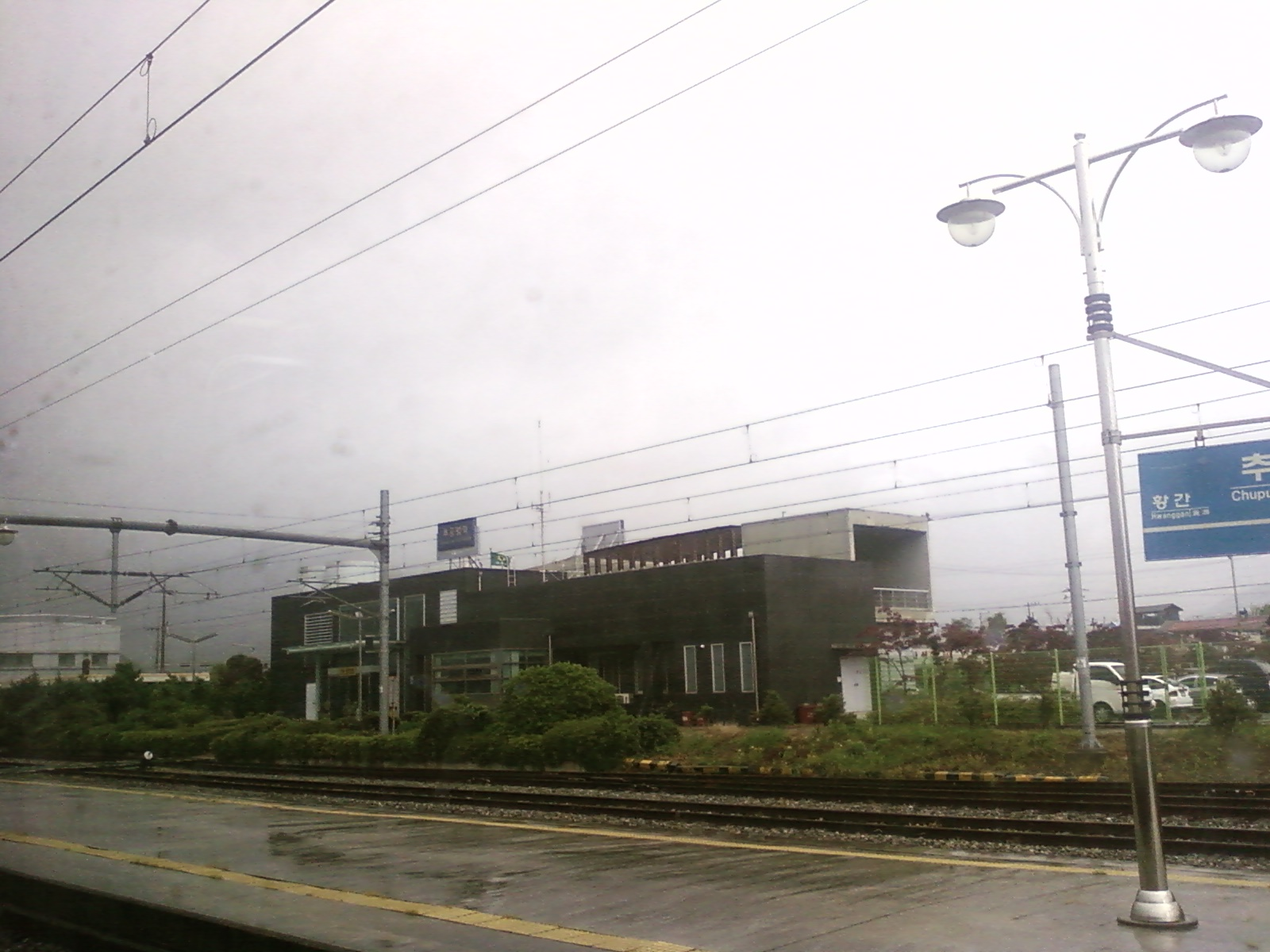
Chupungnyeong station

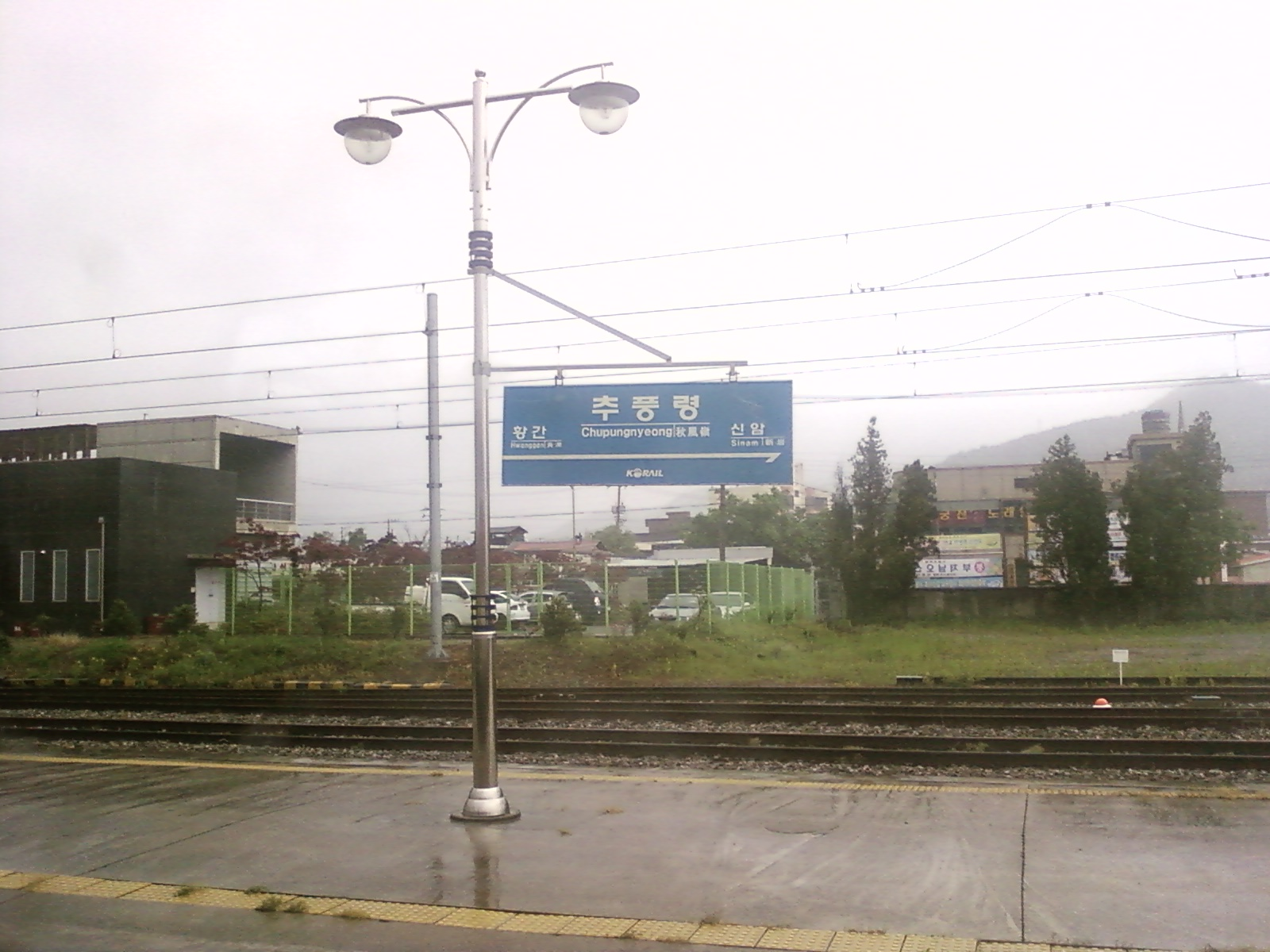
Chupungnyeong station

Chupungnyeong station (Korean: 추풍령역) is a railway station on the Gyeongbu Line in Yeongdong, South Korea.

There is an historic water tower at the station from 1939 that supplied steam engine trains.

Preceding station	Korail	Following station
Hwanggan towards Seoul	ITX-Maum Gyeongbu Line	Gimcheon towards Busan
Hwanggan towards Daejeon or Seoul	Mugunghwa-ho Gyeongbu Line	Gimcheon towards Busan
Gimcheon towards Dongdaegu	Mugunghwa-ho Chungbuk Line	Hwanggan towards Yeongju
