= Samsan station (Jungang Line) =

Railway station in South Korea

삼산
Samsan
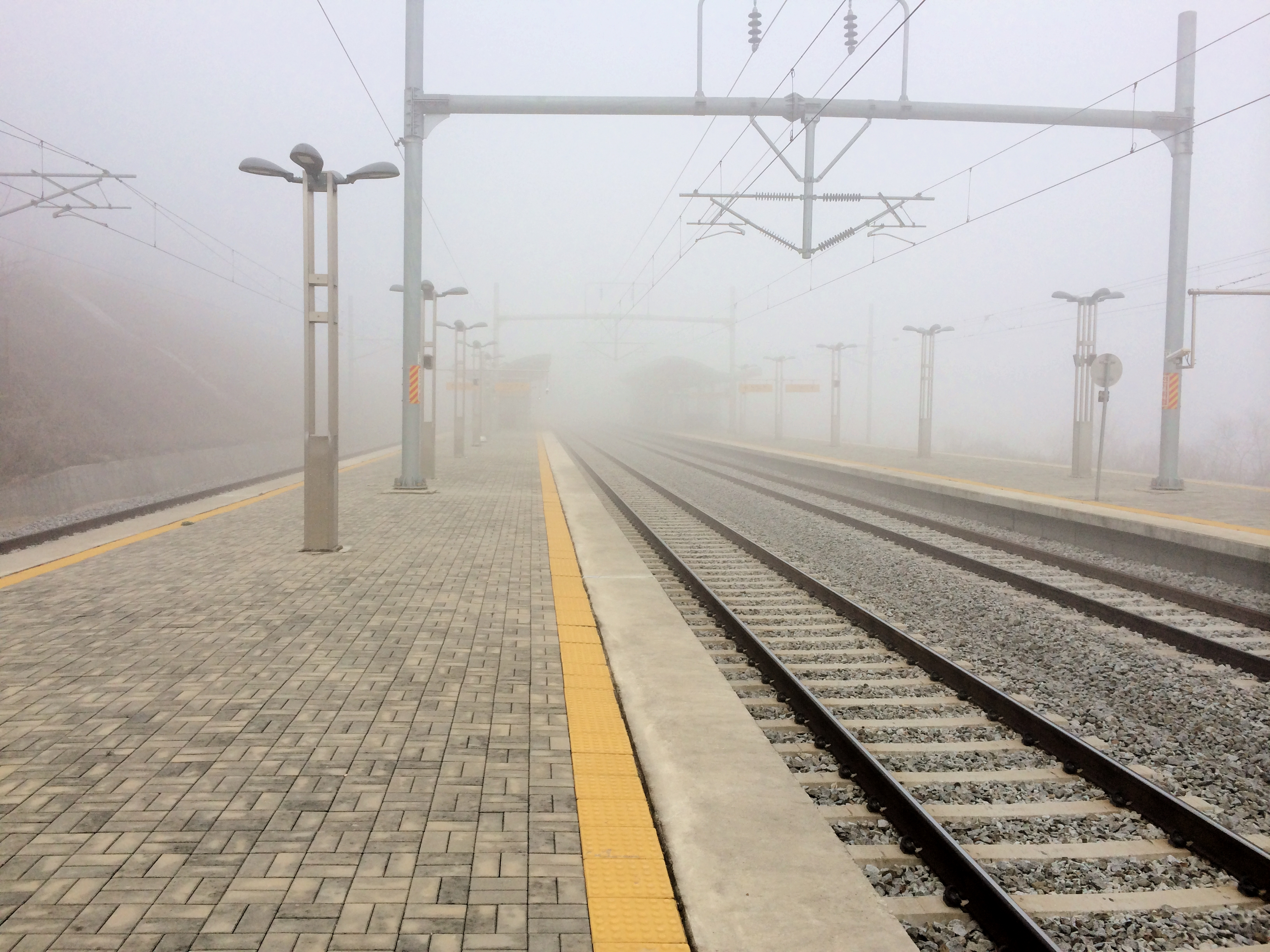

Korean name
- Hangul: 삼산역
- Hanja: 三山驛
- Revised Romanization: Samsannyeok
- McCune–Reischauer: Samsannyŏk

General information
- Location: Samsan-ri, Yangdong-myeon, Yangpyeong-gun, Gyeonggi-do; South Korea
- Coordinates: 37°23′32″N 127°46′47″E
- Operator: Korail
- Line: Jungang Line
- Platforms: 2
- Tracks: 4

Construction
- Structure type: Aboveground

History
- Opened: December 7, 1965
Location

Samsan station (formerly Pandae station) is a railway station in Yangpyeong County, South Korea. It is on the Jungang Line.
