= Baekhwasan (Goesan and Mungyeong) =

Mountain in South Korea

Highest point
- Elevation: 1,064 m (3,491 ft)

Geography
- Location: South Korea

Korean name
- Hangul: 백화산
- Hanja: 白華山
- RR: Baekhwasan
- MR: Paekhwasan

Baekhwasan (Korean: 백화산) is a mountain between Goesan County, North Chungcheong Province and Mungyeong, North Gyeongsang Province in South Korea. It has an elevation of 1,064 m (3,491 ft).

== See also ==
- List of mountains in Korea
