= Jungang Line =

Railway line in South Korea

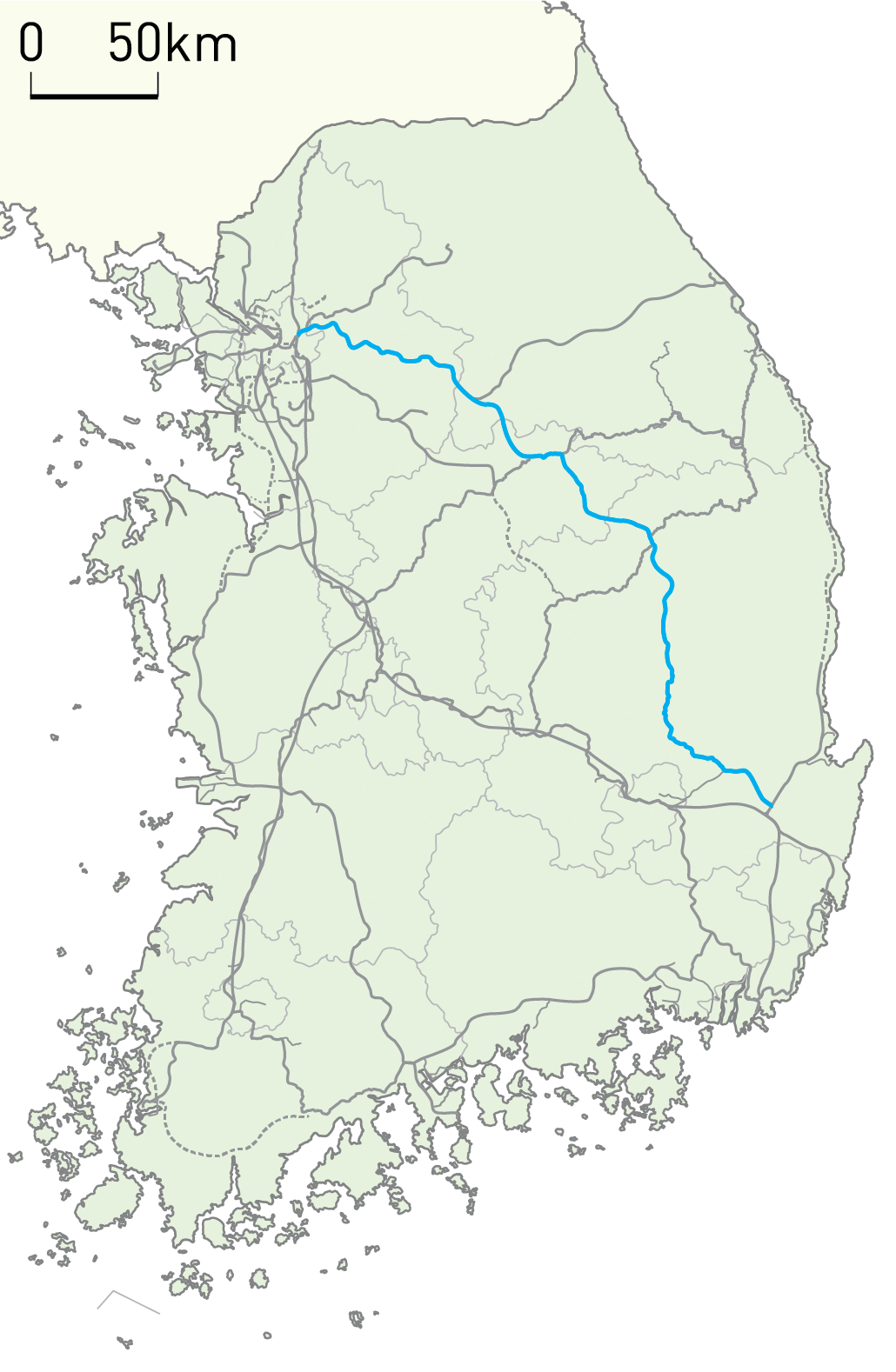

Overview
- Native name: 중앙선(中央線)
- Status: Operational
- Owner: Korea Rail Network Authority
- Locale: Seoul; Gyeonggi; Gangwon (South Korea); North Chungcheong; North Gyeongsang
- Termini: Cheongnyangni; Moryang
- Stations: 56

Service
- Type: Heavy rail, Passenger/freight rail Regional rail, Commuter rail, Intercity rail
- Operator: Korail

History
- Opened: Stages between 1918–1942

Technical
- Line length: 323 km (201 mi)
- Num of tracks: Double track
- Track gauge: 1,435 mm (4 ft 8 1/2 in) standard gauge
- Electrification: 25 kV/60 Hz AC Overhead line

The Jungang Line (Korean: 중앙선; Hanja: 中央線; lit. 'Central line') is a railway line connecting Cheongnyangni in Seoul to Moryang in Gyeongju in South Korea, traversing central South Korea from the northwest to the southeast. It is also referred to as the rail line of the Seoul Metropolitan Subway from Yongsan station to Jipyeong station. The section from Deokso to Moryang is designated as a semi-high-speed rail line.

== History ==
The Jungang Line was opened along its full length between Cheongnyangni and Gyeongju on April 1, 1942. Jungang means "central" in Korean, and describes the line's route through the mountains in the east-central part of South Korea. When Korea was under Japanese rule, the line was briefly known as the Gyeonggyeong Line, referring to a line running between Seoul and Gyeongju.

On 1 December 1938 'Donghae Jungbu Line' (Daegu–Haksan) was divided into three parts: Daegu Line, the Gyeongygeong Line and Donghae Jungbu Line, which was later merged into the Donghae Nambu Line. At the same time the Gyeonggyeong Line was extended to the Ubo station. The southern part, Gyeonggyeong Nambu Line, was opened as follows:

Date	Section	Length
1 December 1938	Yeongcheon–Ubo	40.1 km
1 March 1940	Ubo–Gyeongbuk Andong (Andong)	48.9 km
1 July 1941	Gyeongbuk Andong–Yeongju	38.7 km

On the other hand, the northern part, Gyeonggyeong Bukpu Line, was constructed as follows:

Date	Section	Length
1 April 1939	East Gyeongseong (Cheongnyangni)–Yangpyeong	52.5 km
1 April 1940	Yangpyeong–Wonju	55.9 km
1 July 1941	Wonju–Jecheon	46.8 km

On 1 April 1942, the two lines were merged into the Gyeonggyeong Line with the opening of the section Jechon–Yeongju (62.3 km). The name of the line was changed back to its present name after the end of World War II.

Following the 1961 coup, the Supreme Council for National Reconstruction started South Korea's first five-year plan, which included a construction program to complete the railway network and foster economic growth. As part of the program, in the outskirts of Seoul, a 4.9 km (3.0 mi) long avoiding line was built from Mangu to Seongbuk on the Gyeongwon Line, called the Mangu Line, which opened on December 30, 1963.

== Upgrade ==
A part of the line was the first to be electrified with the 25 kV/60 Hz AC catenary system in South Korea: the catenary on the 155.2 km long Cheongnyangri–Jecheon section went into service on June 20, 1973. The 29.0 km long extension to Danseong followed on December 30, 1987, finally the 35.0 km long extension to Yeongju on December 23, 1988.

The entire line is foreseen for electrification and double-tracking.

=== Phase 1: Cheongnyangni–Deokso ===
The double-tracking of the 18.0 km long section from the terminus Cheongnyangni to Deokso was completed first on December 16, 2005. Work started in mid-2001 with a planned budget of 1,700 billion won.

On September 1, 2010, the South Korean government announced a strategic plan to reduce travel times from Seoul to 95% of the country to under 2 hours by 2020. As part of the plan, the Cheongnyangri–Wonju section of the Jungang Line is to be further upgraded for 230 km/h.

=== Phase 2: Deokso-Wonju ===
The first 5.7 km to Paldang was opened on December 27, 2007, the next 15.9 km to Guksu on December 29, 2008, and another 19.7 km to Yongmun on December 23, 2009. The total budget of the 90.4 km long upgrade project is 2,036.847 billion won.

The upgrade of the Deokso–Wonju section is more extensive, with significant re-alignments to enable a line speed of 150 km/h.

=== Phase 3: Wonju–Jecheon electrified double-track line project ===
The Wonju–Jecheon electrified double-track line project was launched in 2011, connecting Seowonju station at Wonju and Bongyang station at Jecheon. Between Seowonju and Bongyang, the double-track line was to run in a new alignment, most of which would be the 25,080 metre long Musil Tunnel. Works on the tunnel was slated to commence in June 2011, for a planned start of service on the Wonju-Jecheon section in January 2021. Under the government's 2010 strategic plan for 2020, the new alignment in the Wonju–Bongyang section was to be laid out for 250 km/h, the rest to Jecheon was to be upgraded for 230 km/h. The new alignment was to reduce line distance by 5.5 km and was to cut travel time by 20 minutes. The project budget for the entire 41.1 km Wonju-Jecheon section was 1,140.061 billion won.

Later, the plan was redesigned to build two tunnels instead of single long tunnel, to improve safety. On June 22, 2020, construction was completed and Korean National Railway(KR) started trial running. Commercial running started on January 5, 2021.

Plans for the double-tracking of the section from Bongyang, the terminus of the Chungbuk Line, to Jecheon, have been prepared separately.

=== Phase 4: Dodam–Yeongcheon ===
==== Jecheon–Dodam section ====
The Jecheon–Dodam section was double-tracked. The rebuilt section is 17.4 km in length, was built with a budget of 320.024 billion won, and is primarily intended to improve capacity for freight transports to a cement factory. The project was completed on 31 March 2011.

==== Dodam–Andong section ====
The reconstruction of the Dodam–Andong section as an electrified double-track line started in December 2013. The section includes the realignment of the Danyang–Yeongju section, which opened as a single-track section on 13 December 2020. The Yeongju–Danchon section, another re-alignment, opened as single-track on 17 December 2020. The electrified and double-tracked Dodam–Danyang section opened on 5 January 2021, the second track on the Danyang–Yeongju section opened on 30 June 2022, finally the second track on the Yeongju–Danchon section and the electrified and double-tracked Danchon–Andong section opened on 28 July 2022. Operation of the entire section at the maximum line speed started only in December 2023.

==== Andong–Yeongcheon section ====
This section was originally planned to open in the summer 2022 as electrified single-track line, prepared for later double-tracking. In December 2021, the decision was made to complete the section as a double-track line, with opening planned in Late 2024. Construction started in December 2022 and completed on 20 December 2024. After 23 years, the whole Jungang Line became fully double-tracked and electrified.

=== Phase 5: Yeongcheon–Gyeongju ===
Electrification and doubling in this section were completed on December 28, 2021.

== Services ==
=== KTX service ===
KTX service was launched on 5 January 2021. Since Jungang Line is not a dedicated high-speed line, the new rolling-stock KTX-Eum was adopted. KTX service was expanded to Bujeon station on 20 December 2024. The time required is around four hours.

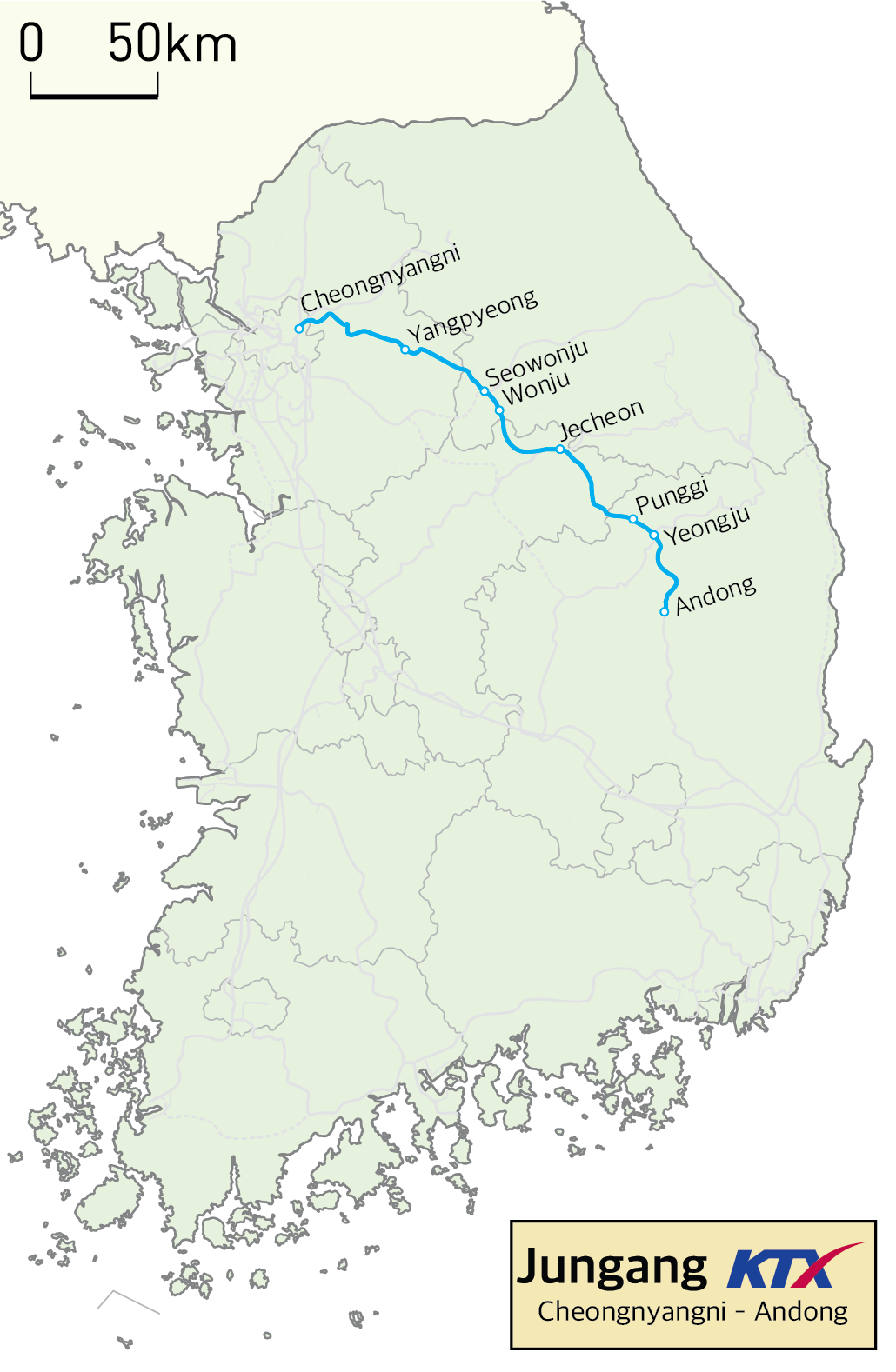
Jungang KTX route map

=== Regular rail service ===
Before the KTX era, trans-Korean Tongil-ho trains were in operation on the Jungang and Donghae Nambu lines, providing a 12-hour train journey from Seoul to Busan.

The entire line is served by cross-country Mugunghwa-ho trains, which are most frequent until Jecheon, where many trains continue east on the Taebaek Line. As of October 2010, the travel time from Cheongnyangni in Seoul is a minimum of 1 hour 18 minutes to Wonju, 2 hours 2 minutes to Jecheon, around 3 hours to Yeongju, 5 hours 22 minutes to Yeongcheon, and 6 hours 8 minutes to Gyeongju. Some trains continue to Bujeon station in Busan, with a total travel time of 8 hours by day and 20 minutes shorter by night. After 20 December 2024, the Mugunghwa-ho were replaced by ITX-Maum.

=== Seoul Metropolitan Subway ===
Commuter rail service was launched on Jungang line (fully integrated with the Seoul Metropolitan Subway) as the upgrading of the line progressed. The service started on December 16, 2005, connecting parts of the Gyeongwon Line (from Yongsan to Hoegi station) and the Jungang line (from Hoegi to Deokso) under the interim name Yongsan–Deokso Line.

An extension to Paldang station on December 27, 2007, brought the official renaming of the service to Jungang line, although the line actually incorporates parts of both Gyeongwon and Jungang lines. In December 2008, the service was extended to Guksu station, and an express train service was launched, operating twice a day during morning commuting hours. The express trains ran westward only, from Yangpyeong to Yongsan. The service was finally extended to Yongmun station in Yangpyeong County on December 23, 2009.

The western terminus was Yongsan station ever since the opening of the line. However, with the completion of Gyeongui Line extension to Yongsan on December 27, 2014, both the Jungang and Gyeongui lines were combined into the "Gyeongui-Jungang Line," and trains now run to Munsan station near the North Korean border.

== Stations ==
This list does not include stations served only by Gyeongui-Jungang Line services.

Station number (Seoul Subway)	Station	Hangeul	Hanja	Services
K117	Cheongnyangni	청량리	淸凉里	Seoul Metropolitan Subway: ITX-Saemaeul services Mugunghwa-ho services DMZ Train
K126	Deokso	덕소	德沼	Mugunghwa-ho services (limited service)
K135	Yangpyeong	양평	楊平	ITX-Saemaeul services Mugunghwa-ho services
K137	Yongmun	용문	龍門	Mugunghwa-ho services (limited service)
K138 (terminus)	Jipyeong	지평	砥平	Mugunghwa-ho services (limited service)

After Jipyeong, major stations on the line include:

- Samsan station
- Seowonju station
- Wonju station
- Bongyang station, the terminus of the Chungbuk Line
- Jecheon station, the terminus of the Taebaek Line. All Chungbuk Line trains departs from here due to the location of Bongyang station
- Danyang station
- Punggi station
- Yeongju station, the terminus of the Yeongdong and Gyeongbuk lines
- Andong station, where most passenger trains from Seoul terminate
- Uiseong station
- Gunwi station
- Yeongcheon station, the terminus of the Daegu Line
- Ahwa station
- Gyeongju station on the Donghae Line (from Gyeongju, some trains continue south on the Donghae Line to Bujeon station in Busan).

== See also ==
- Gyeongui–Jungang Line
- Seoul Metropolitan Subway
- Korail
- Transportation in South Korea
