= Gimcheon station =

Train station in South Korea

김천
Gimcheon
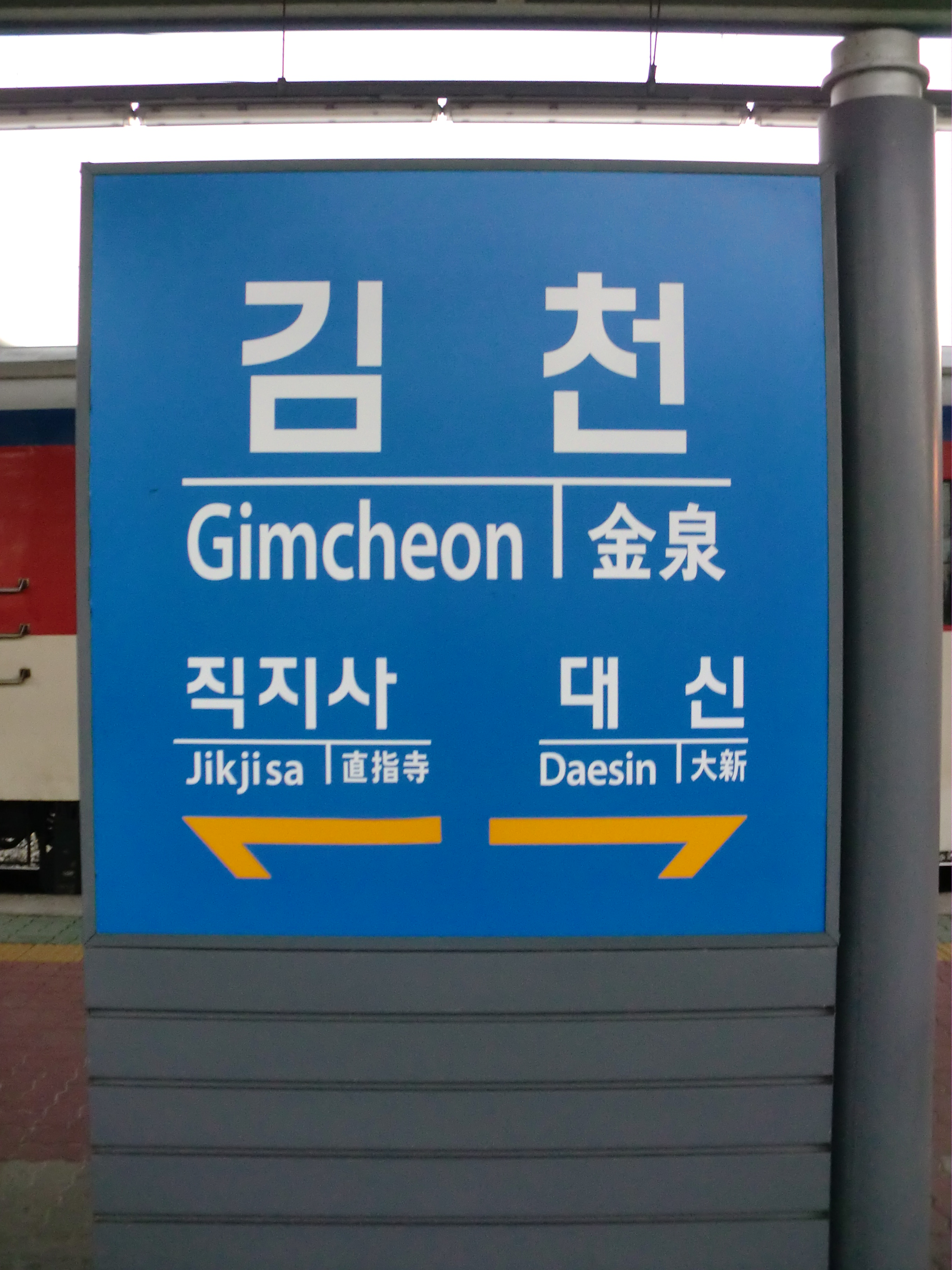

Korean name
- Hangul: 김천역
- Hanja: 金泉驛
- Revised Romanization: Gimcheonnyeok
- McCune–Reischauer: Kimch'ŏnnyŏk

General information
- Location: Pyeonghwa-dong, Gimcheon, North Gyeongsang; South Korea
- Coordinates: 36°07′24″N 128°06′53″E
- Operator: Korail
- Lines: Gyeongbu Line, Gyeongbuk Line
- Platforms: 3
- Tracks: 5

Construction
- Structure type: Aboveground

History
- Opened: January 1, 1905
Location

Gimcheon Station is a railway station on the Gyeongbu Line and the Gyeongbuk Line.

Preceding station	Korail	Following station
Hwanggan towards Seoul	ITX-Saemaeul Gyeongbu Line	Gumi towards Busan
Daejeon towards Seoul	ITX-Saemaeul Gyeongjeon Line	Gumi towards Jinju
Chupungnyeong towards Seoul	ITX-Maum Gyeongbu Line	Gumi towards Busan
Chupungnyeong towards Daejeon or Seoul	Mugunghwa-ho Gyeongbu Line	Gumi towards Busan
Gumi towards Dongdaegu	Mugunghwa-ho Chungbuk Line	Chupungnyeong towards Yeongju
Oksan towards Yeongju	Mugunghwa-ho Gyeongbuk Line	Terminus
