= Andong station =

Railway station in South Korea

안동
Andong
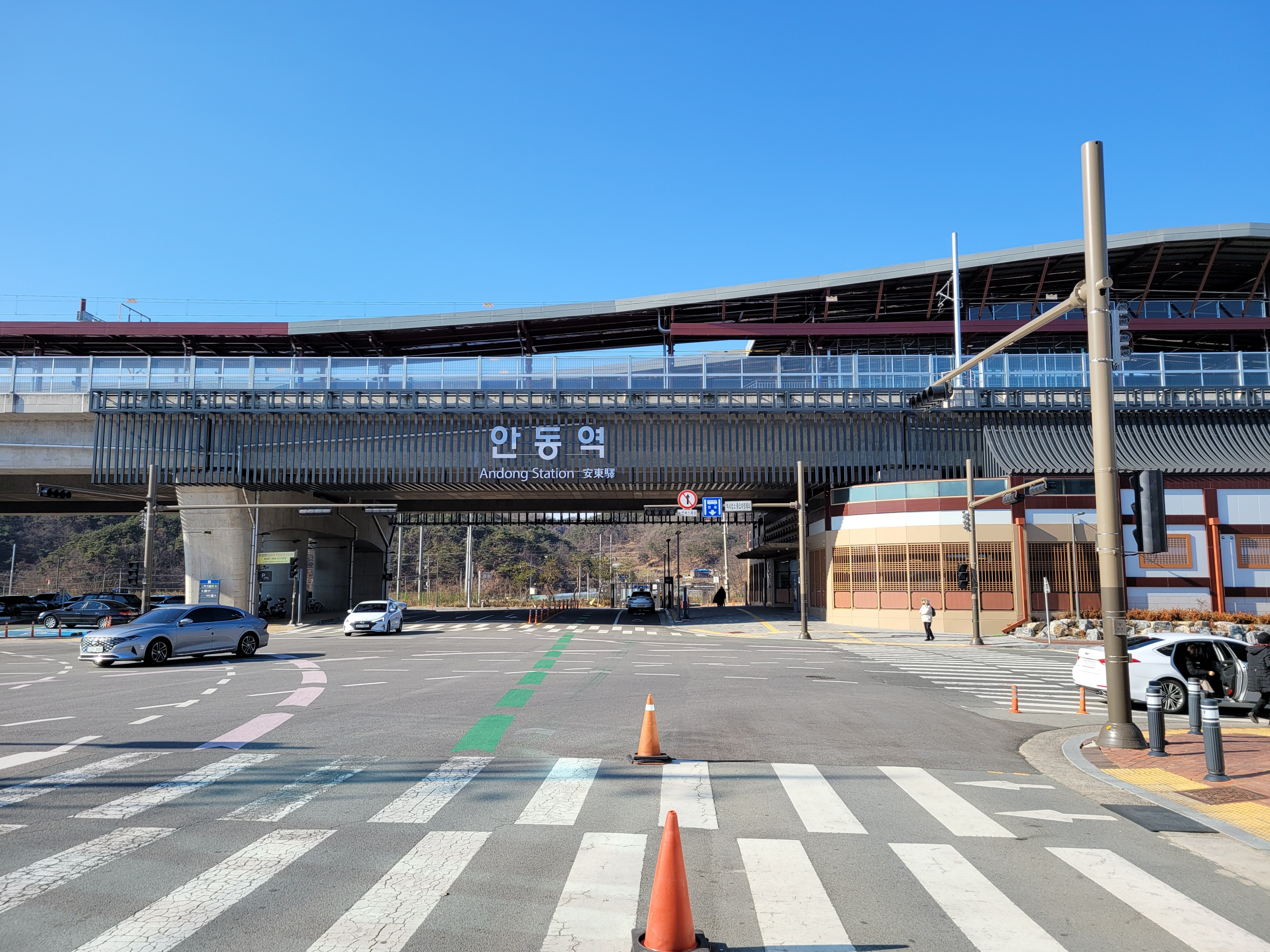

Korean name
- Hangul: 안동역
- Hanja: 安東驛
- RR: Andong-yeok
- MR: Andong-yŏk

General information
- Location: 122-16 Gyeongdong-ro, Andong, North Gyeongsang; South Korea
- Coordinates: 36°34′30″N 128°40′29″E
- Operator: Korail
- Line: Jungang Line

Construction
- Structure type: Aboveground

History
- Opened: October 15, 1930

Services
Preceding station	Korea Train Express	Following station
Yeongju towards Seoul	Jungang KTX	Uiseong towards Bujeon
Preceding station	Korail	Following station
Yeongju towards Cheongnyangni	ITX-Maum Jungang Line	Terminus
Yeongju towards Cheongnyangni	ITX-Maum Jungang Line	Uiseong towards Bujeon
Yeongju towards Donghae	Mugunghwa-ho Yeongdong Line	Uiseong towards Dongdaegu
Location

Andong station is a railway station on the Jungang Line.

As of December 17, 2020, the location of Andong Station has changed from downtown (adjacent to the Nakdong River) to near the edge of town (next to Andong Bus Terminal).

== Tourism ==
Andong Station serves as a key hub for tourists visiting nearby attractions like Hahoe Folk Village and the Andong Soju Museum.

== History ==
Recently, a wildfire in Uiseong caused disruptions to railway services between Andong and Gyeongju. As a result, trains heading south from Andong stopped at the station, while those heading north stopped at Gyeongju Station. Korail operated replacement buses.

== Gallery ==
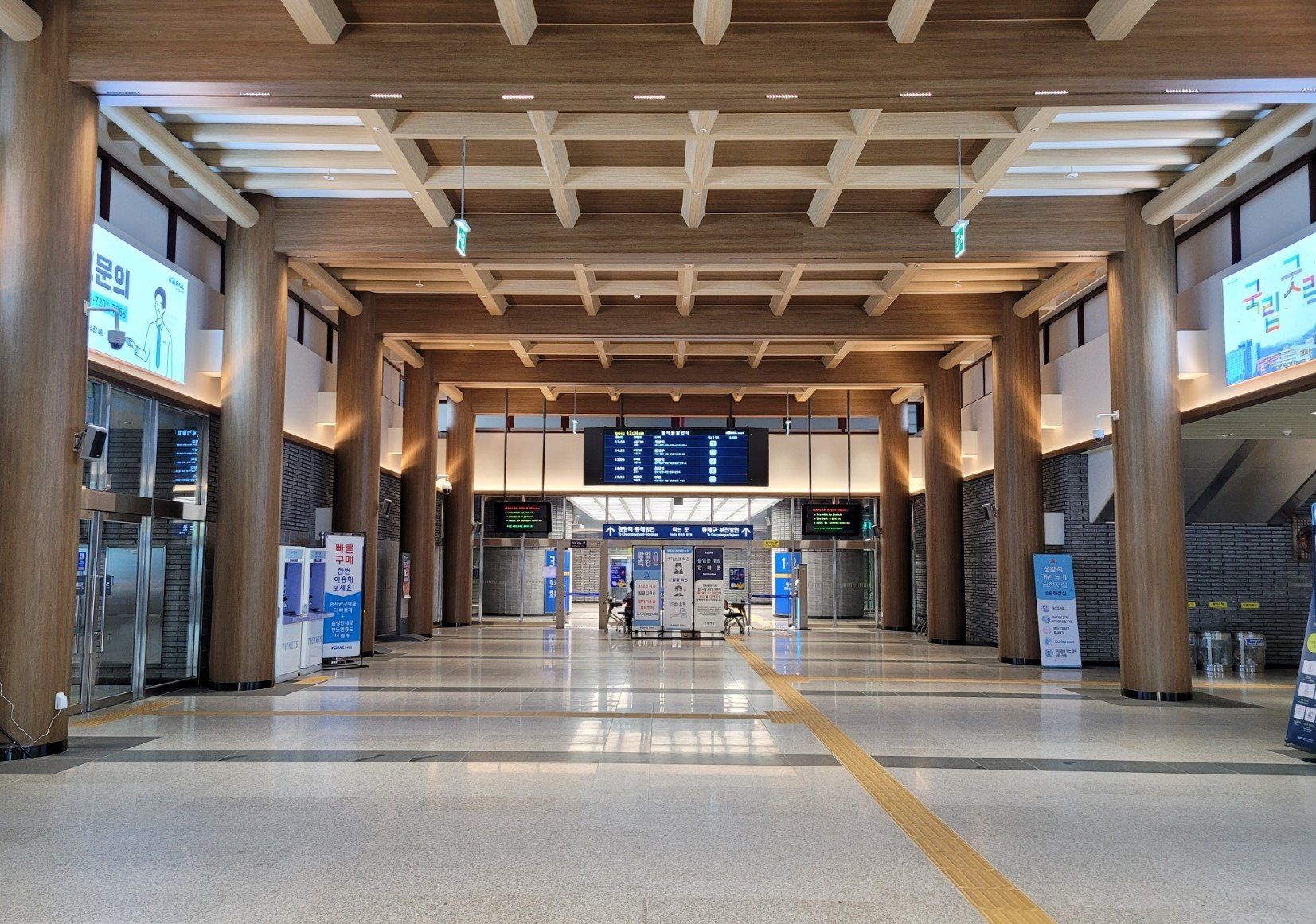
Interior

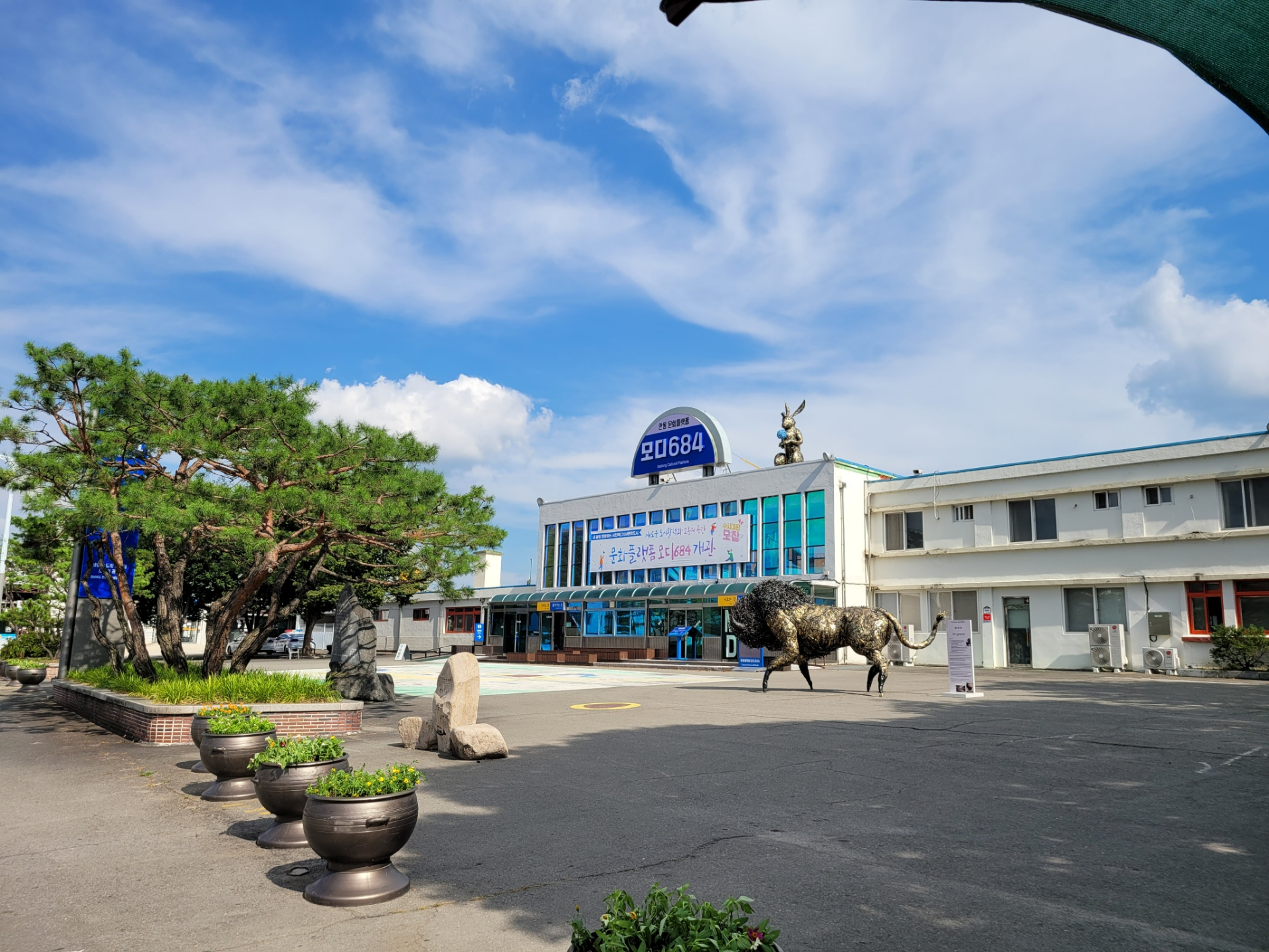
Old station (1960–2021)
