= Yeongju station =

Train station in South Korea

영주
Yeongju
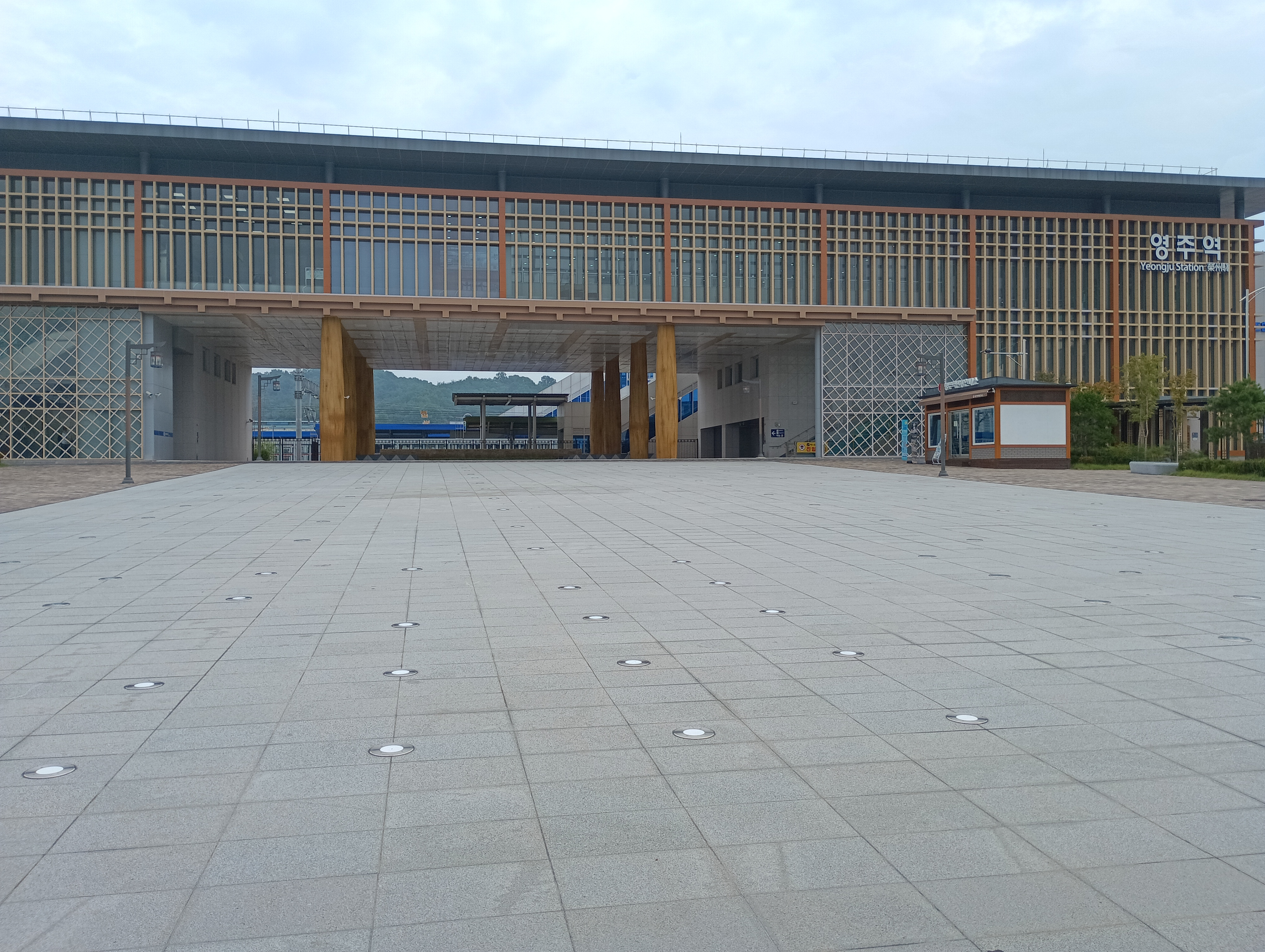

Korean name
- Hangul: 영주역
- Hanja: 榮州驛
- Revised Romanization: Yeongjuyeok
- McCune–Reischauer: Yŏngjuyŏk

General information
- Location: 64 Seonbi-ro, Yeongju, North Gyeongsang; South Korea
- Coordinates: 36°48′39.37″N 128°37′32.69″E
- Operator: Korail
- Lines: Jungang Line, Yeongdong Line, Gyeongbuk Line
- Platforms: 3
- Tracks: 5

Construction
- Structure type: Aboveground

History
- Opened: July 1, 1941

Services
Preceding station	Korea Train Express	Following station
Punggi towards Seoul	Jungang KTX	Andong towards Bujeon
Preceding station	Korail	Following station
Punggi towards Cheongnyangni	ITX-Maum Jungang Line	Andong Terminus
Punggi towards Cheongnyangni	ITX-Maum Jungang Line	Andong towards Bujeon
Terminus	Mugunghwa-ho Gyeongbuk Line	Yecheon towards Gimcheon
Bonghwa towards Donghae	Mugunghwa-ho Yeongdong Line	Andong towards Dongdaegu
Bonghwa towards Donghae	Mugunghwa-ho Yeongdong Line	Terminus
Terminus	V-Train	Bonghwa towards Cheoram
Location

Yeongju Station is a railway station in Yeongju on the Jungang Line, the Yeongdong Line and the Gyeongbuk Line in South Korea.
