= North Gyeongsang Province =

Province of South Korea

Coordinates: 36°15′N 128°45′E

- Province
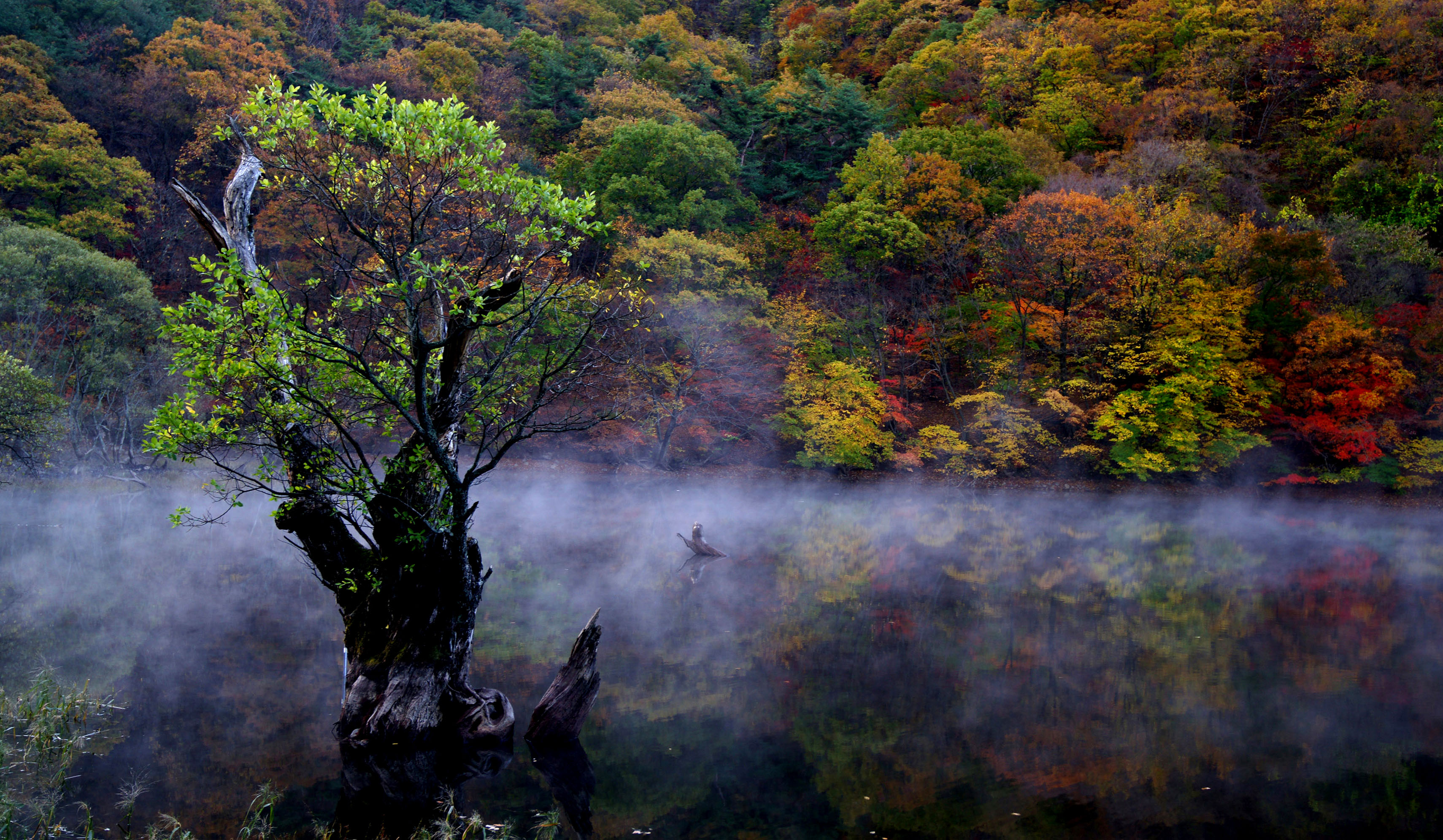
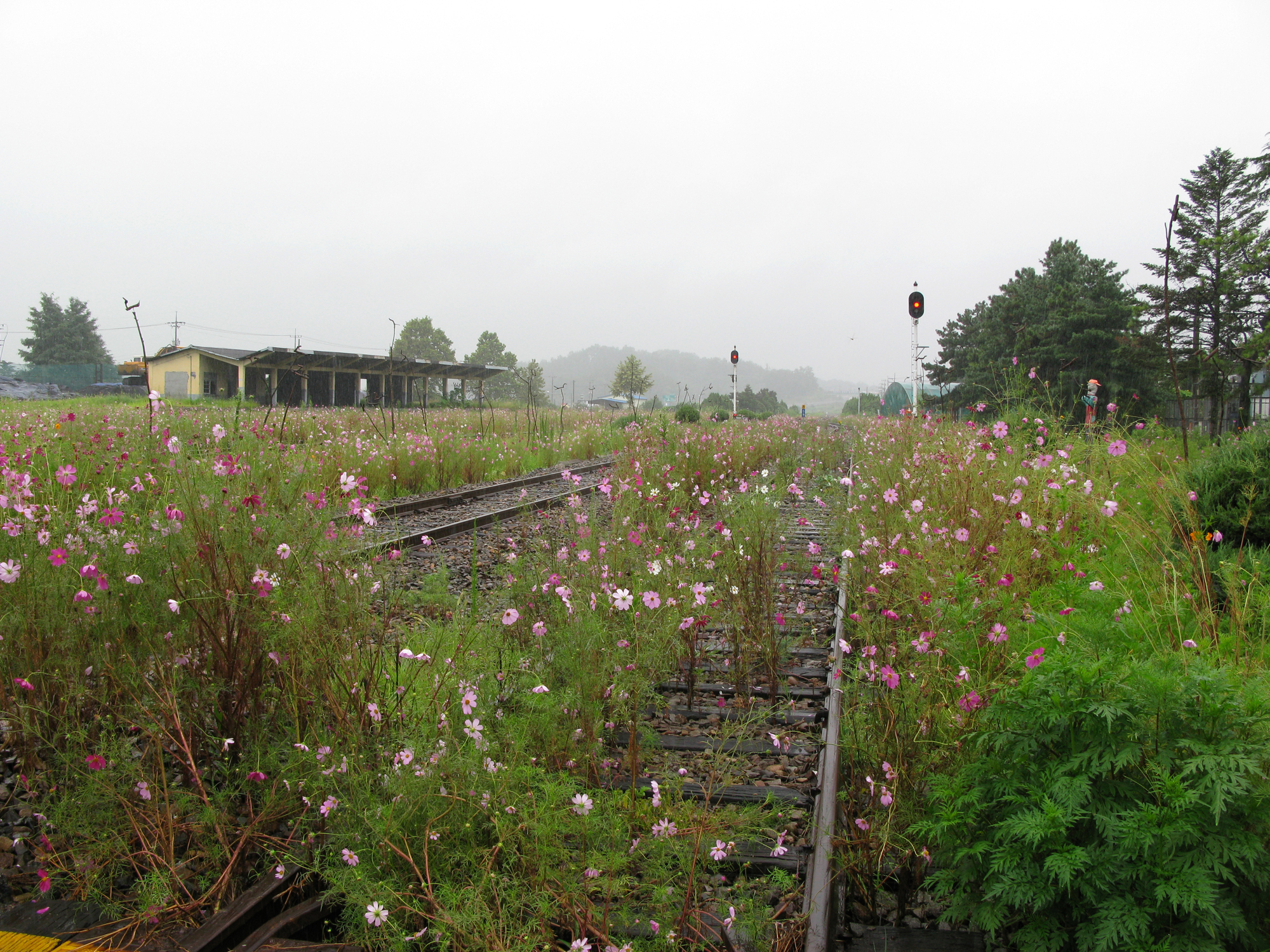
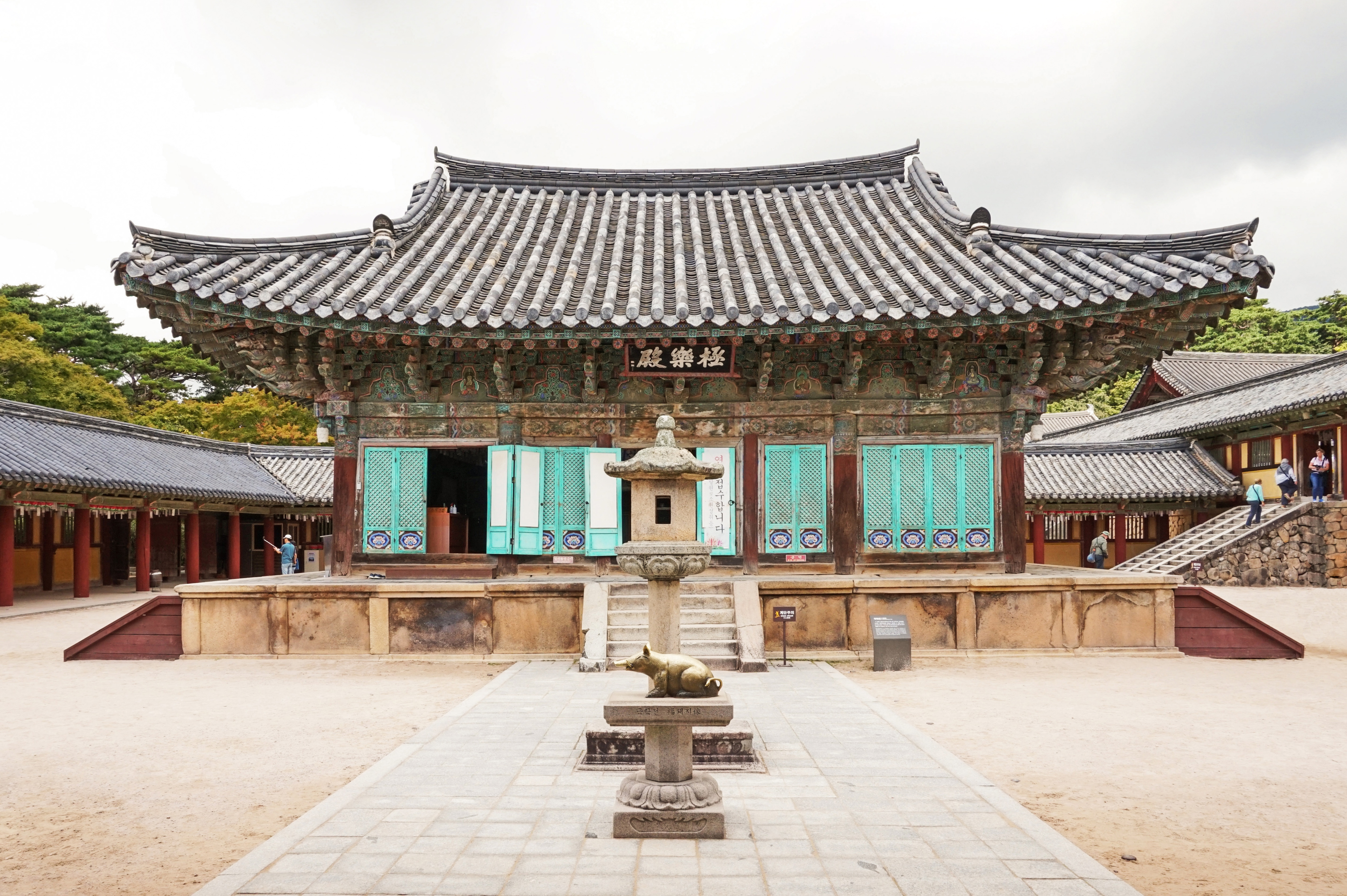
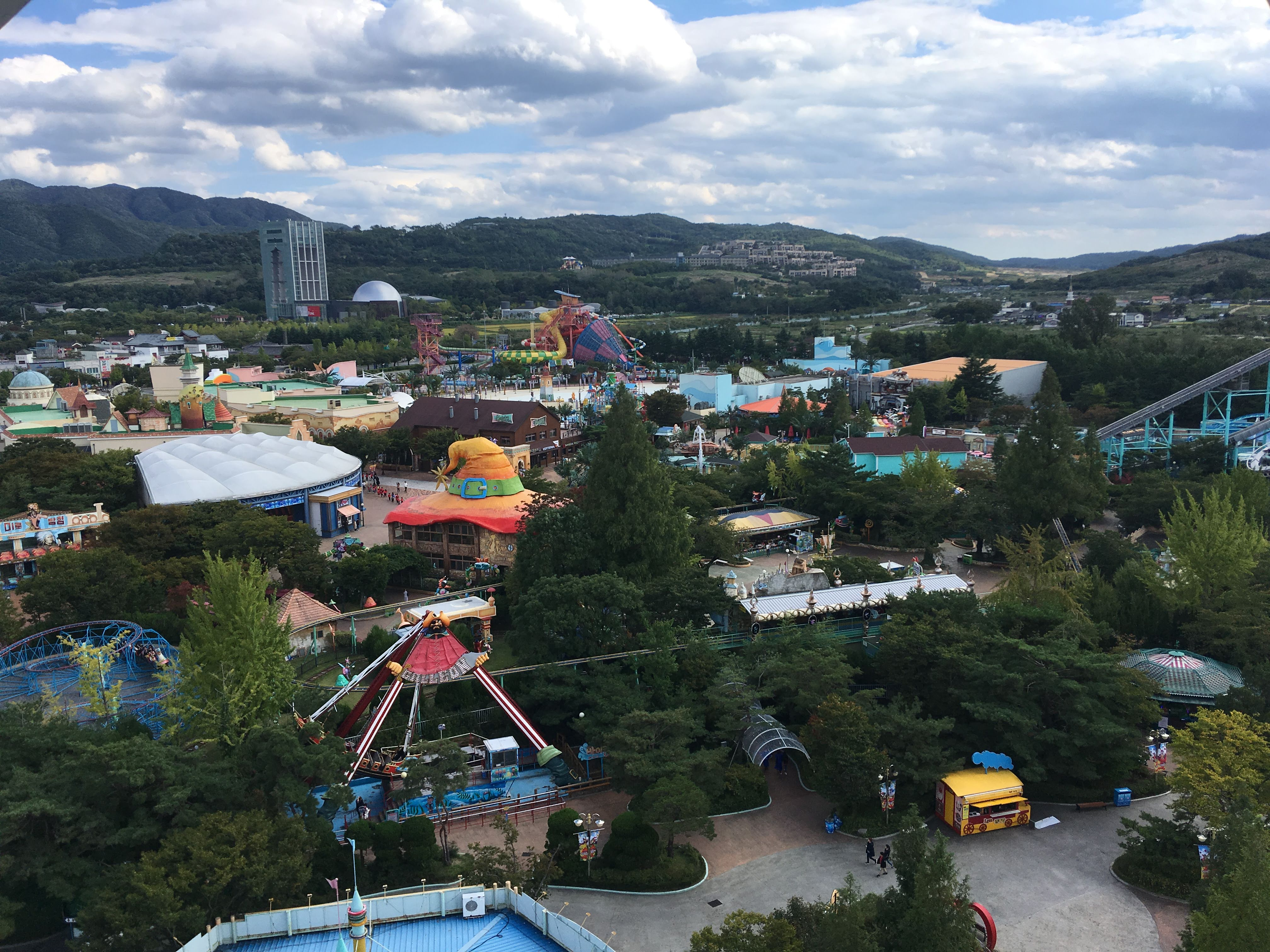
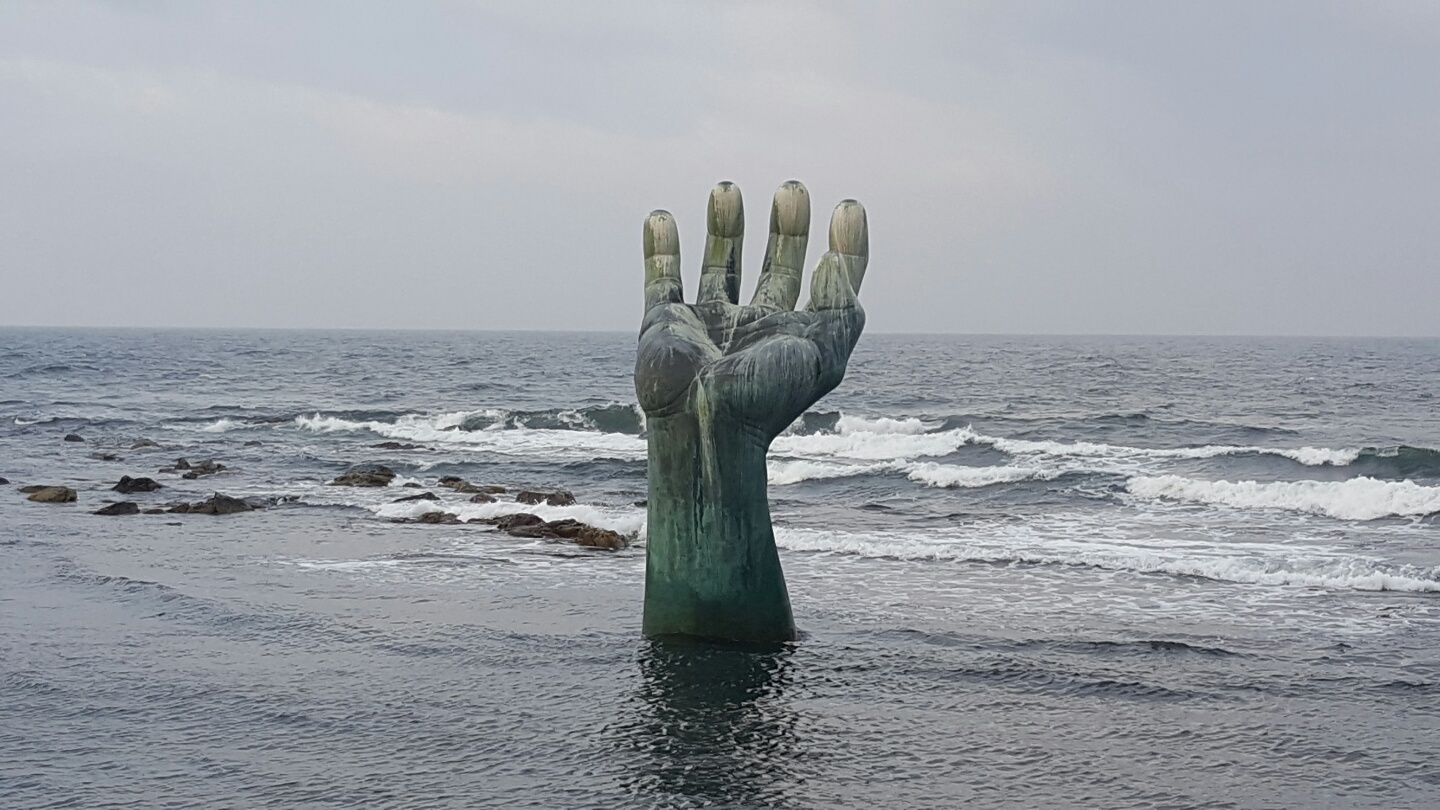
- Juwangsan Jeomchon Station Bulguksa Gyeongju World Homigot

- Flag Logo

- Country: South Korea
- Region: Yeongnam
- Largest city: Pohang
- Capital: Andong
- Subdivisions: 10 cities; 12 counties

Government
  - Governor: Lee Cheol-woo (People Power)

Area
  - Total: 19,030 km^{2} (7,350 sq mi)
  - Rank: 1st

Population (October, 2014)
  - Total: 2,546,960
  - Rank: 3rd
  - Density: 141.7/km^{2} (367/sq mi)
- Demonym: Gyeongbukite

Metropolitan Symbols
  - Flower: Crape-myrtle
  - Tree: Zelcova
  - Bird: Grey Heron

GDP (Nominal, 2023)
  - Total: KRW 127 trillion (US$ 102 billion)
  - Per capita: US$ 43,886
- ISO 3166 code: KR-47
- Dialect: Gyeongsang
- Website: Official website (English)

Korean name
- Hangul: 경상북도
- Hanja: 慶尙北道
- RR: Gyeongsangbuk-do
- MR: Kyŏngsangbuk-to

Short name
- Hangul: 경북
- Hanja: 慶北
- RR: Gyeongbuk
- MR: Kyŏngbuk

North Gyeongsang Province (Korean: 경상북도; Korean pronunciation: [kjʌŋ.saŋ.buk̚.t͈o]), also known as Gyeongbuk (경북), is a province in eastern South Korea. With an area of 18,420 km^{2} (7,110 sq mi), North Gyeongsang is the largest province in the Korean peninsula. The province was formed in 1896 from the northern half of the former Gyeongsang province, and remained a province of Korea (as Keishōhoku-dō during Japanese rule) until the country's division in 1945, then became part of South Korea.

Daegu was the capital of North Gyeongsang Province between 1896 to 2016, but has not been a part of the province since 1981. In 2016, the provincial capital moved from Daegu to Andong.

== History ==
The 1,000-year-old Silla Kingdom flourished and unified the previous three kingdoms. The area was named Gyeongsang-do in 1314 during the Goryeo Dynasty. In 1896, during the Joseon Dynasty, the area was renamed Gyeongsangbuk-do as 13 provinces were reorganized. The current administrative district was reorganized with the reorganization of Bu, Gun, and Myeon in 1914.

== Geography and climate ==
The province is part of the Yeongnam region, bordered to the south by South Gyeongsang Province, to the west by North Jeolla and North Chungcheong Provinces, and to the north by Gangwon Province. It is largely surrounded by mountains: the Taebaek Mountains in the east and the Sobaek Mountains in the west. The province also contains the island of Ulleungdo, the seventh largest island in South Korea, located in the Sea of Japan.

== Culture ==
=== Cuisine ===
Andong Sikhye, a local food from Andong and northern North Gyeongsang Province, is essential for entertaining guests on Seollal or feast days. Unlike ordinary Sikhye, it is red with Chili powder, has more grains of rice, and less soup.

=== Tourism ===
North Gyeongsang Province is the homeland of the former kingdom of Silla and has retained much of its cultural tradition. A number of artists, political leaders and scholars have come from the province.

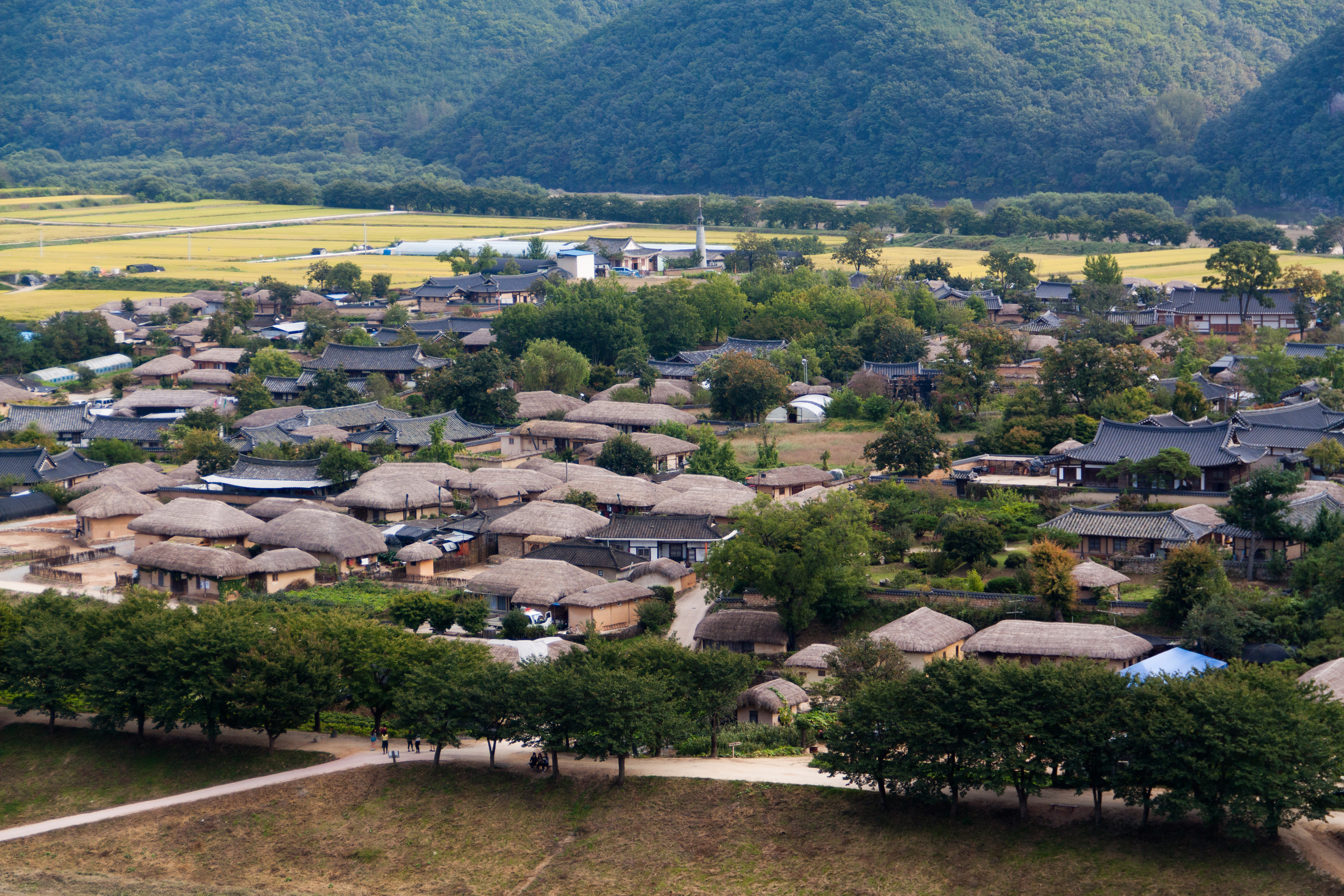
View of Hahoe Folk Village in Andong

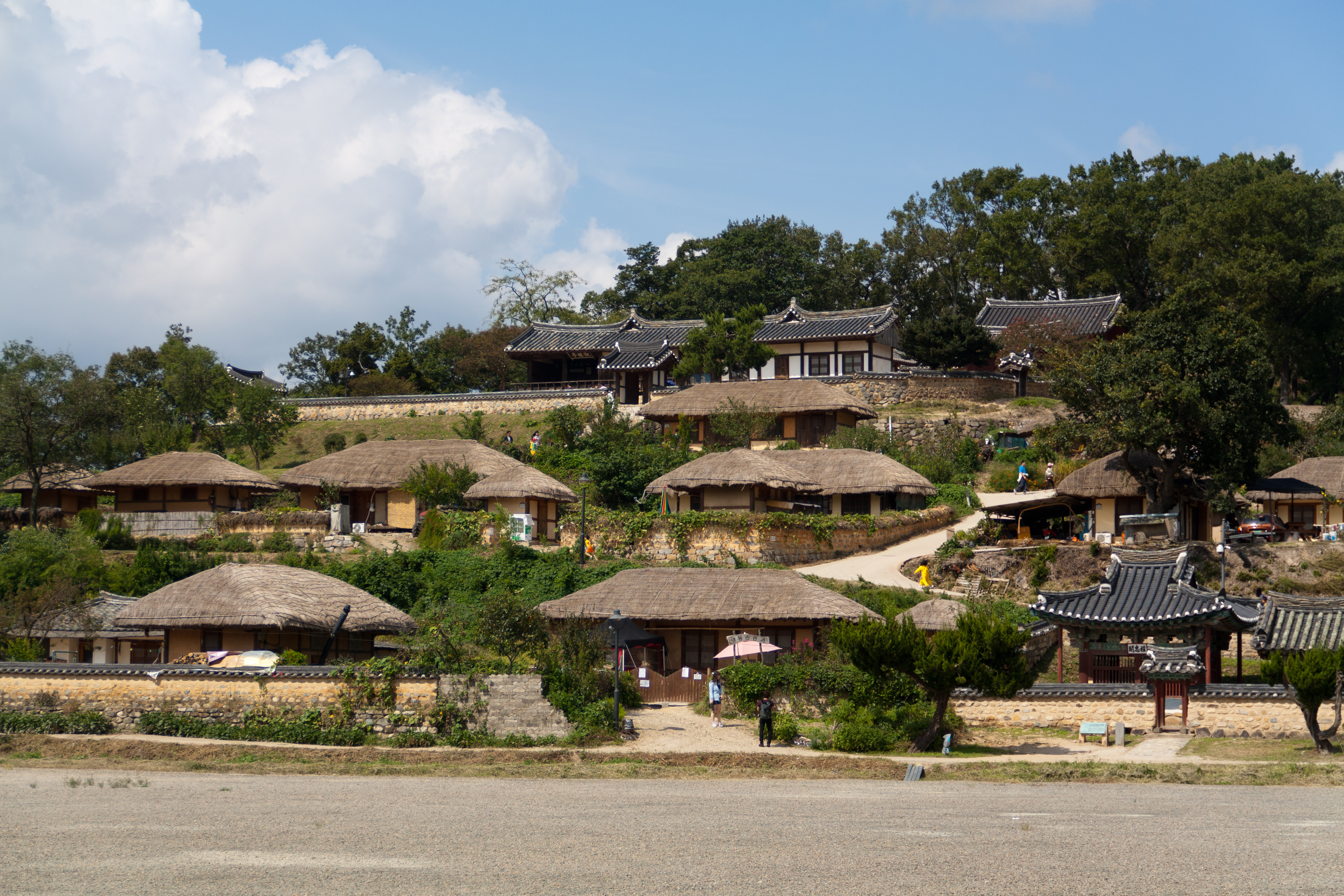
View of Yangdong Folk Village in Gyeongju

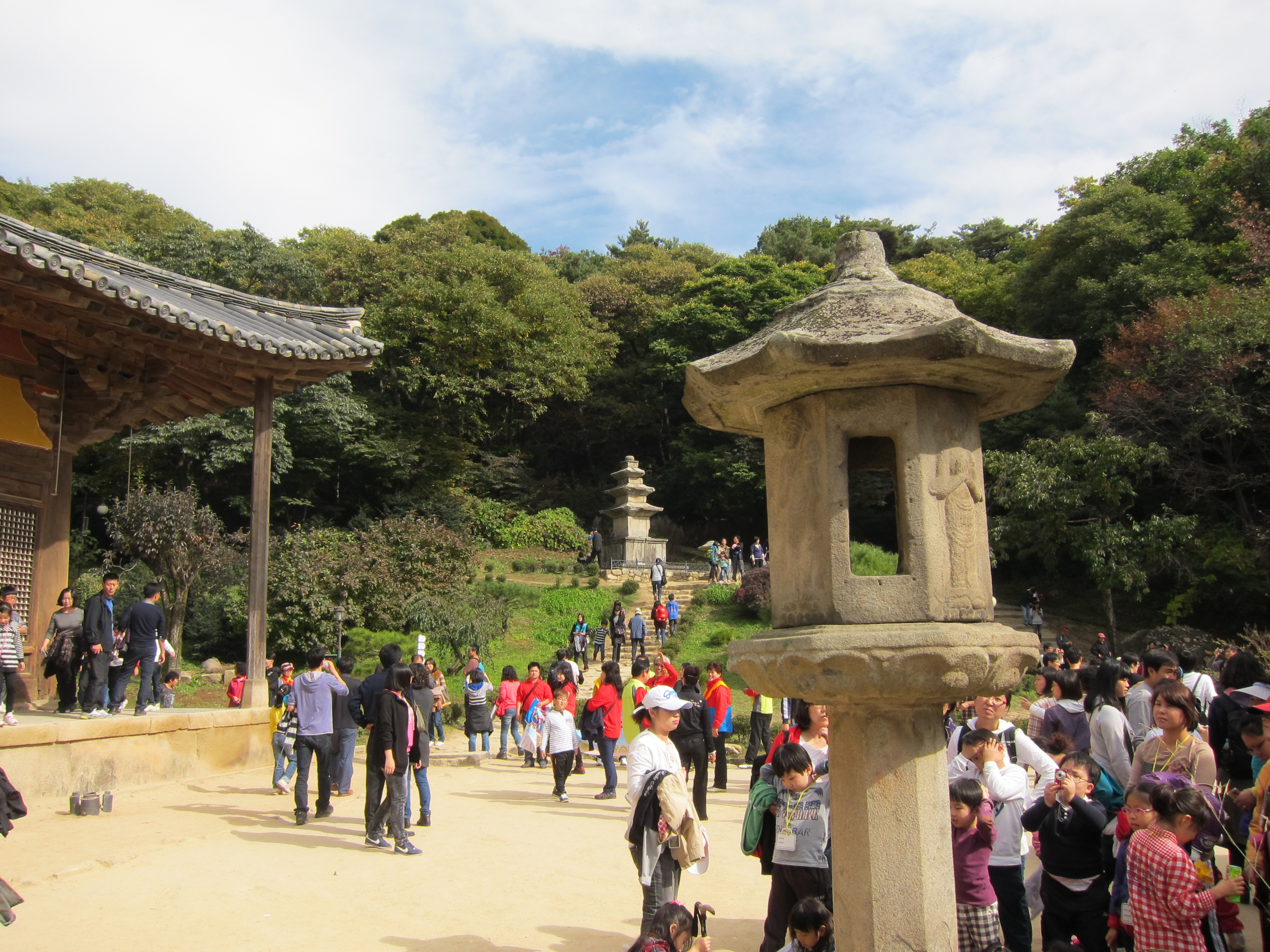
View of Muryangsojieon lantern statue and Buseoksa in Yeongju

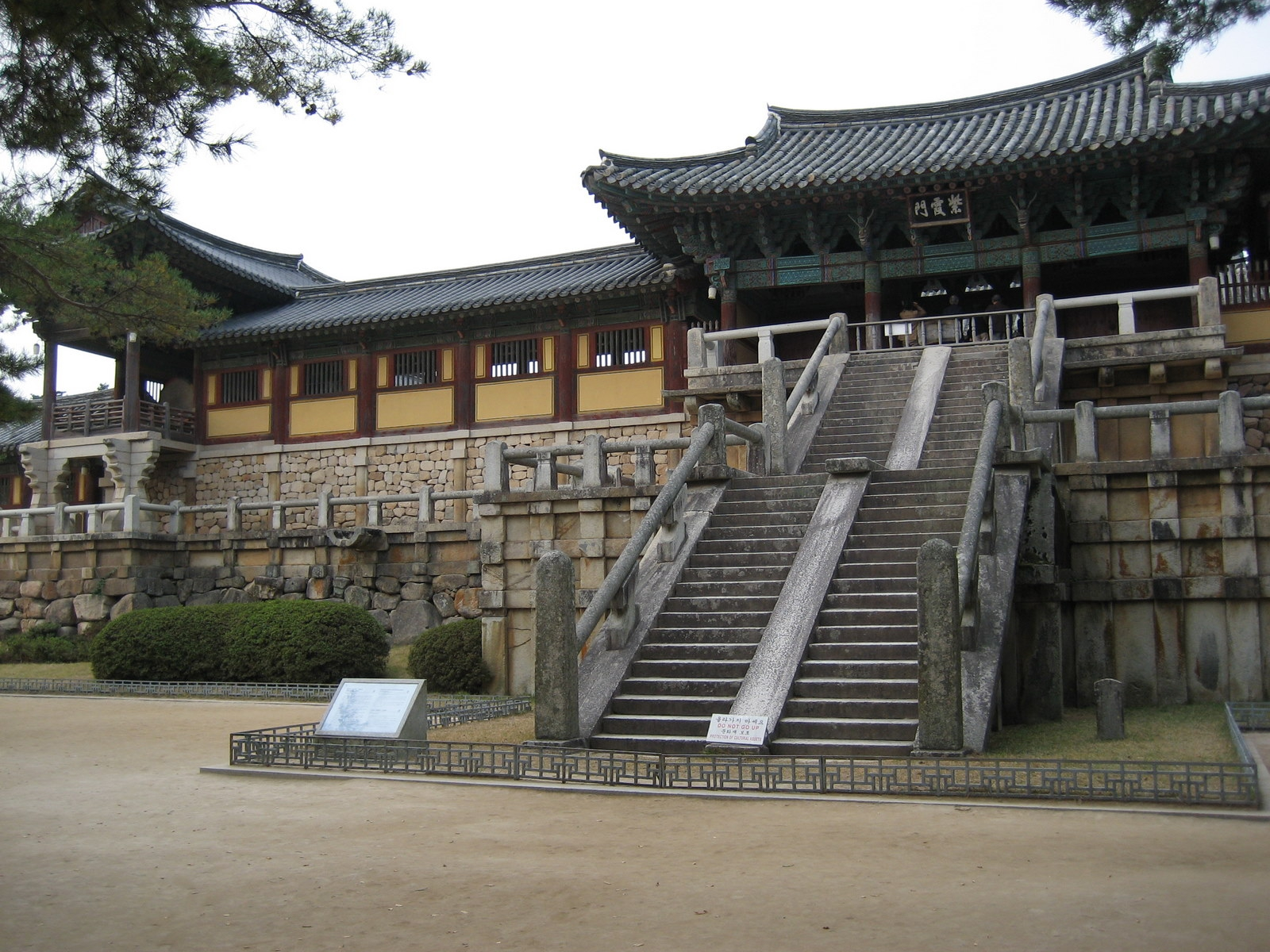
Bulguksa in Gyeongju

== Demographics ==
Historical population
Year	Pop.	±% p.a.
1980	3,102,060	—
1990	2,766,797	−1.14%
2000	2,724,931	−0.15%
2010	2,600,032	−0.47%
2015	2,680,294	+0.61%
2020	2,644,757	−0.27%
Source: Citypopulation

=== Cities, towns, and villages ===
Largest cities in North Gyeongsang Province Citypopulation
Rank		Pop.
1	Pohang	501,109
2	Gumi	416,603
3	Gyeongsan	283,733
4	Gyeongju	261,778
5	Andong	159,412
6	Gimcheon	139,145
7	Chilgok	115,756
8	Yeongju	103,818
9	Yeongcheon	100,353
10	Sangju	95,473

=== Religion ===
Religion in North Gyeongsang Province (2024)
1. Not religious (49.0%)
2. Buddhism (24.0%)
3. Protestantism (15.0%)
4. Catholicism (10.0%)
5. Others (2.00%)

According to the census of 2015, 25.3% followed Buddhism and 18.5% followed Christianity (13.3% Protestantism and 5.2% Catholicism). 55.4% of the population is irreligious.

== Administrative divisions ==
Gyeongsangbuk-do is divided into 10 cities (si) and 12 counties (gun). The names below are given in English, hangul, and hanja. Gyeongsang do is originated from Gyeongju & Sangju old city of Gyeong+Sang from Joseon Dynasty (1392–1910). Do means road to 8 directional road from Seoul. Pohang is Korean steel production hub, Gumi is electronics capital of South Korea.

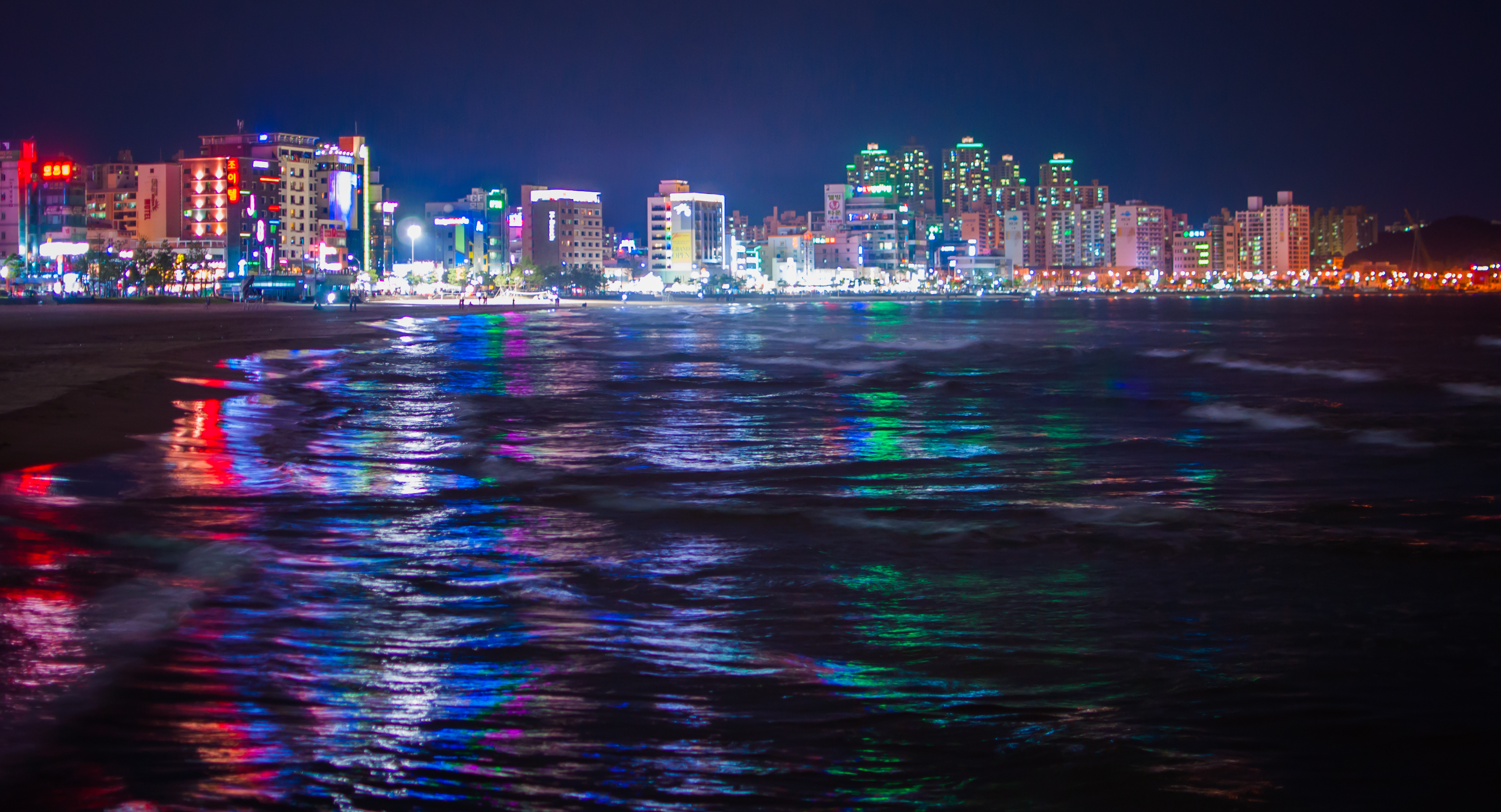
Night view of Pohang

Map	#	Name	Hangul	Hanja	Population (2024)	Subdivisions
— Specific City —
	1	Pohang	포항시	浦項市	492,041	2 ilban-gu — 4 eup, 10 myeon, 15 haengjeong-dong
— City —
	2	Gumi	구미시	龜尾市	404,691	2 eup, 6 myeon, 19 haengjeong-dong
	3	Gyeongsan	경산시	慶山市	266,951	2 eup, 6 myeon, 7 haengjeong-dong
	4	Gyeongju	경주시	慶州市	245,365	4 eup, 8 myeon, 11 haengjeong-dong
	5	Andong	안동시	安東市	153,348	1 eup, 13 myeon, 10 haengjeong-dong
	6	Gimcheon	김천시	金泉市	135,767	1 eup, 14 myeon, 7 haengjeong-dong
	7	Yeongju	영주시	榮州市	99,309	1 eup, 9 myeon, 9 haengjeong-dong
	8	Sangju	상주시	尙州市	92,452	1 eup, 17 myeon, 6 haengjeong-dong
	9	Yeongcheon	영천시	永川市	99,034	1 eup, 10 myeon, 5 haengjeong-dong
	10	Mungyeong	문경시	聞慶市	67,544	2 eup, 7 myeon, 5 haengjeong-dong
— County —
	11	Chilgok County	칠곡군	漆谷郡	108,119	3 eup, 5 myeon
	12	Uiseong County	의성군	義城郡	56,777	1 eup, 17 myeon
	13	Uljin County	울진군	蔚珍郡	46,112	2 eup, 8 myeon
	14	Yecheon County	예천군	醴泉郡	45,948	1 eup, 11 myeon
	15	Cheongdo County	청도군	淸道郡	43,787	2 eup, 7 myeon
	16	Seongju County	성주군	星州郡	44,824	1 eup, 9 myeon
	17	Yeongdeok County	영덕군	盈德郡	40,213	1 eup, 8 myeon
	18	Goryeong County	고령군	高靈郡	35,281	1 eup, 7 myeon
	19	Bonghwa County	봉화군	奉化郡	33,936	1 eup, 9 myeon
	20	Cheongsong County	청송군	靑松郡	26,432	1 eup, 7 myeon
	21	Yeongyang County	영양군	英陽郡	18,259	1 eup, 5 myeon
	22	Ulleung County	울릉군	鬱陵郡	10,557	1 eup, 2 myeon

== Economy ==
In October 2022, the province announced its plan to make the province a leading area centered on the domestic metaverse. It is also a specialized complex for semiconductor and secondary battery national high-tech strategic industries.

=== Industry ===
The service industry accounts for 58.3%, mining manufacturing industry account for 30.6%, construction account for 10.5%, and agriculture and fishing account for 0.6%. Mobile convergence, digital device parts, and energy material parts are major specialized industries.

== Transportation ==
=== Airports ===
The province is served by these airports:

- Daegu International Airport
- Pohang Gyeongju Airport

=== Railway ===
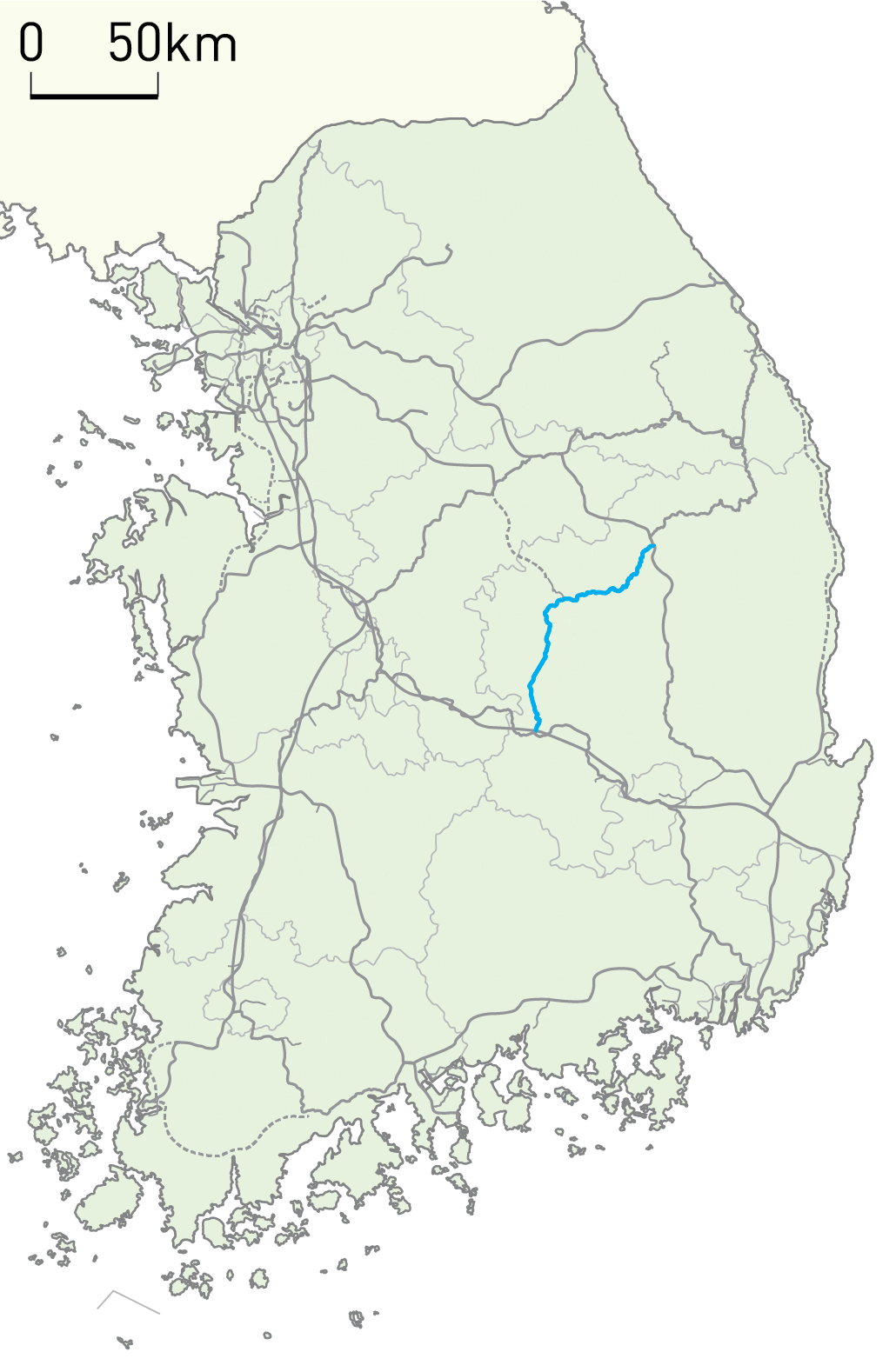
Gyeongbuk Line

- Gyeongbuk Line
- Yeongdong Line

The railway stations in North Gyeongsang Province are as follows:

- Andong station
- Apo station
- Bonghwa station
- Cheongdo station
- Daesin station
- Gimcheon station
- Gimcheon (Gumi) station
- Gumi station
- Gyeongju station
- Gyeongsan station
- Hwabon station
- Jeomchon Station
- Jicheon station
- Jikjisa station
- Jinyeong station
- Moryang station
- Mungyeong station
- Munsu station
- Namseonghyeon station
- Pohang station
- Punggi station
- Sagok station
- Samseong station
- Sinam station
- Sindong station
- Singeo station
- Uiseong station
- Waegwan station
- Yangmok station
- Yeongcheon station
- Yeongdeok station
- Yeongju station
- Yeonhwa station

== Recent discoveries ==
In September 2021, archaeologists announced the discovery of 1500 years-old woman skeleton with a necklace and a bracelet in North Gyeongsang Province. The remains of a 135-centimeter-tall woman, who is estimated to have died in her 20s, were discovered along with the bones of animals such as horses and cows, as well as earthenware.

== Notable people from North Gyeongsang Province ==
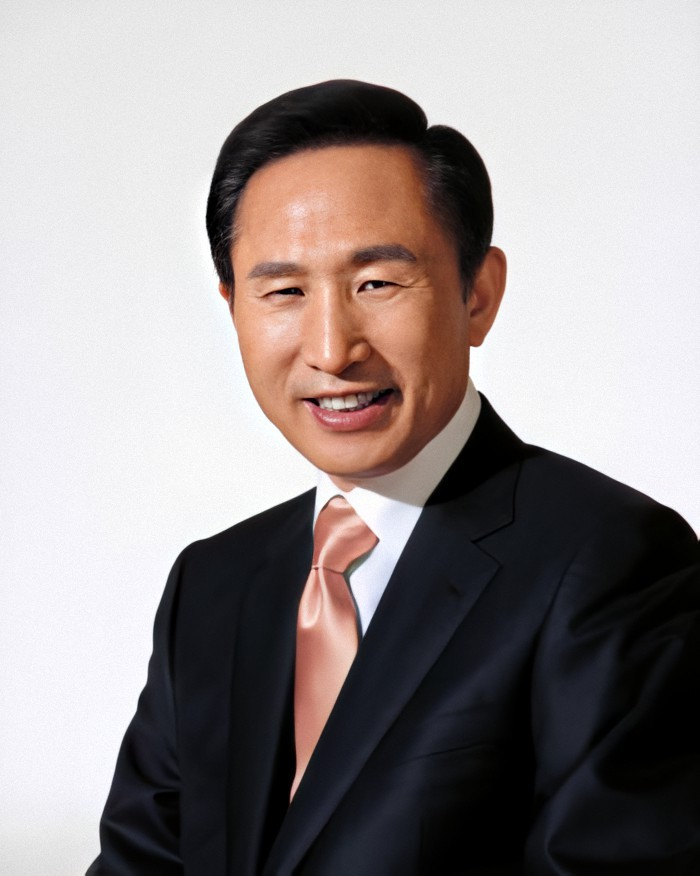
Lee Myung-bak

- Lee Myung-bak, Former President of South Korea
- Han Duck-soo, Former Prime minister of South Korea
- Cho Tae-yul, 41st Foreign Minister of South Korea
- Taeyeon (born Kim Tae-yeon 1989), singer and member of Girls' Generation
- Kwon Yong-jin, South Korean politician
- Kim Boo-kyum, South Korean politician
- Park Chung Hee, Former South Korean President
- Ahn Ji-young, a member of Korean band Bolbbalgan4
- Yoo Jae-ha, South Korean singer and songwriter

== See also ==
- Liancourt Rocks
- People Power Party (South Korea)
- South Gyeongsang Province
