= 대신역 =

대신역 (大新驛) may refer to stations:

- Daesin station, railway station on the Gyeongbu Line
- Taesin station, railway station on the Kŭmgol Line of the Korean State Railway
