= Gyeongbu Line =

Railway line in South Korea

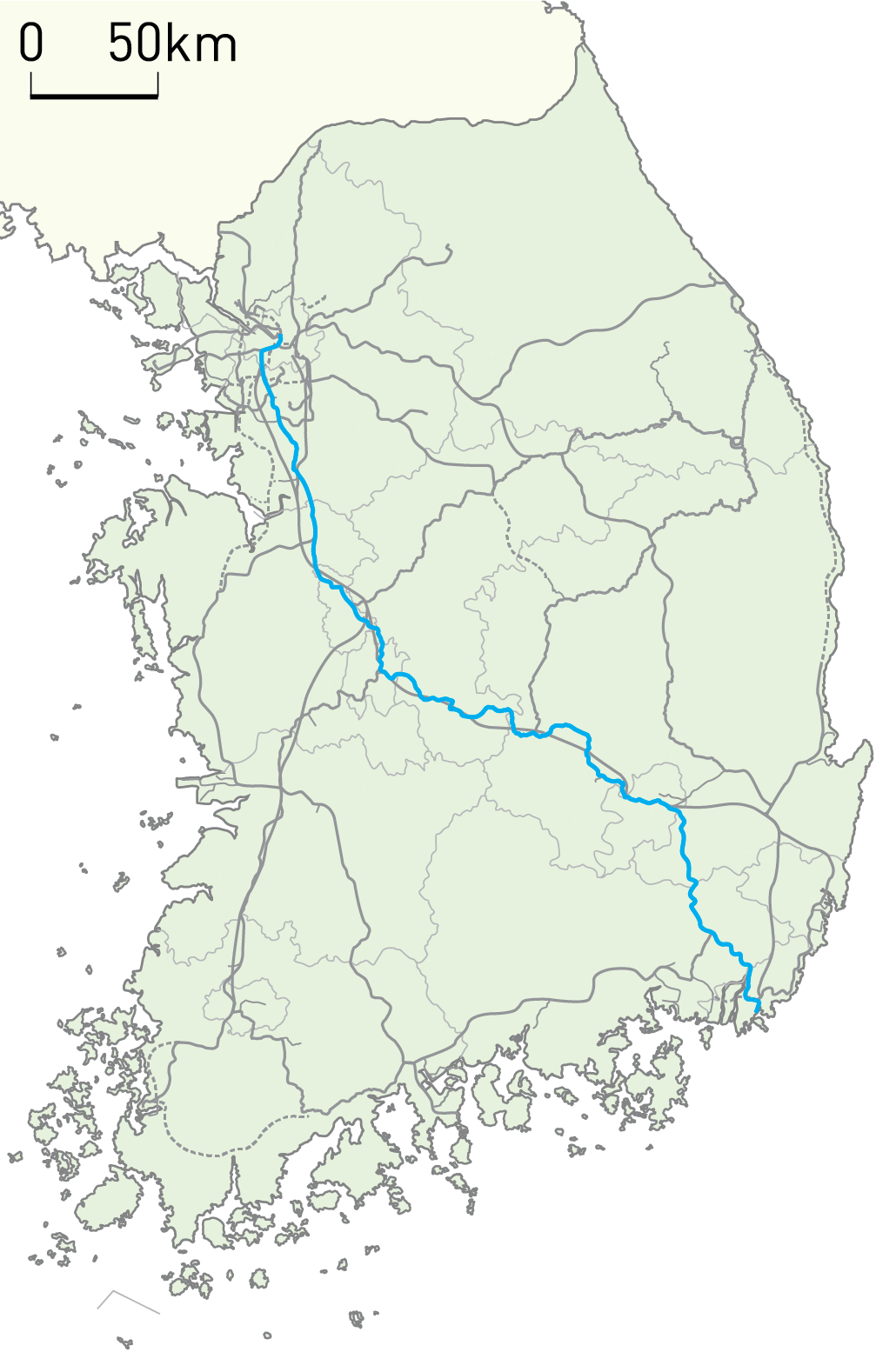

Overview
- Native name: 경부선 (京釜線)
- Owner: Korea Rail Network Authority
- Line number: 302 (KR)
- Termini: Seoul; Busan
- Stations: 90

Service
- Type: Passenger/freight rail
- Operator: Korail
- Depot(s): Guro, Byeongjeom

History
- Opened: January 1, 1905

Technical
- Line length: 441.7 km (274.5 mi)
- Num of tracks: 6 (Seoul–Guro); 4 (Guro–Cheonan); 2 (Cheonan–Busan)
- Track gauge: 1,435 mm (4 ft 8 1/2 in)
- Electrification: 25 kV/60 Hz Catenary
- Operating speed: 150 km/h (93 mph)

- Gyeongbu Line
- Hangul: 경부선
- Hanja: 京釜線
- RR: Gyeongbuseon
- MR: Kyŏngbusŏn

The Gyeongbu Line (Gyeongbuseon) is a railway line in South Korea and is considered to be the most important and one of the oldest in the country. It was constructed in 1905, connecting Seoul with Busan via Suwon, Daejeon, and Daegu. It is by far the most heavily travelled rail line in South Korea.

All types of high-speed, express, local, and freight trains provide frequent service along its entire length.

== History ==
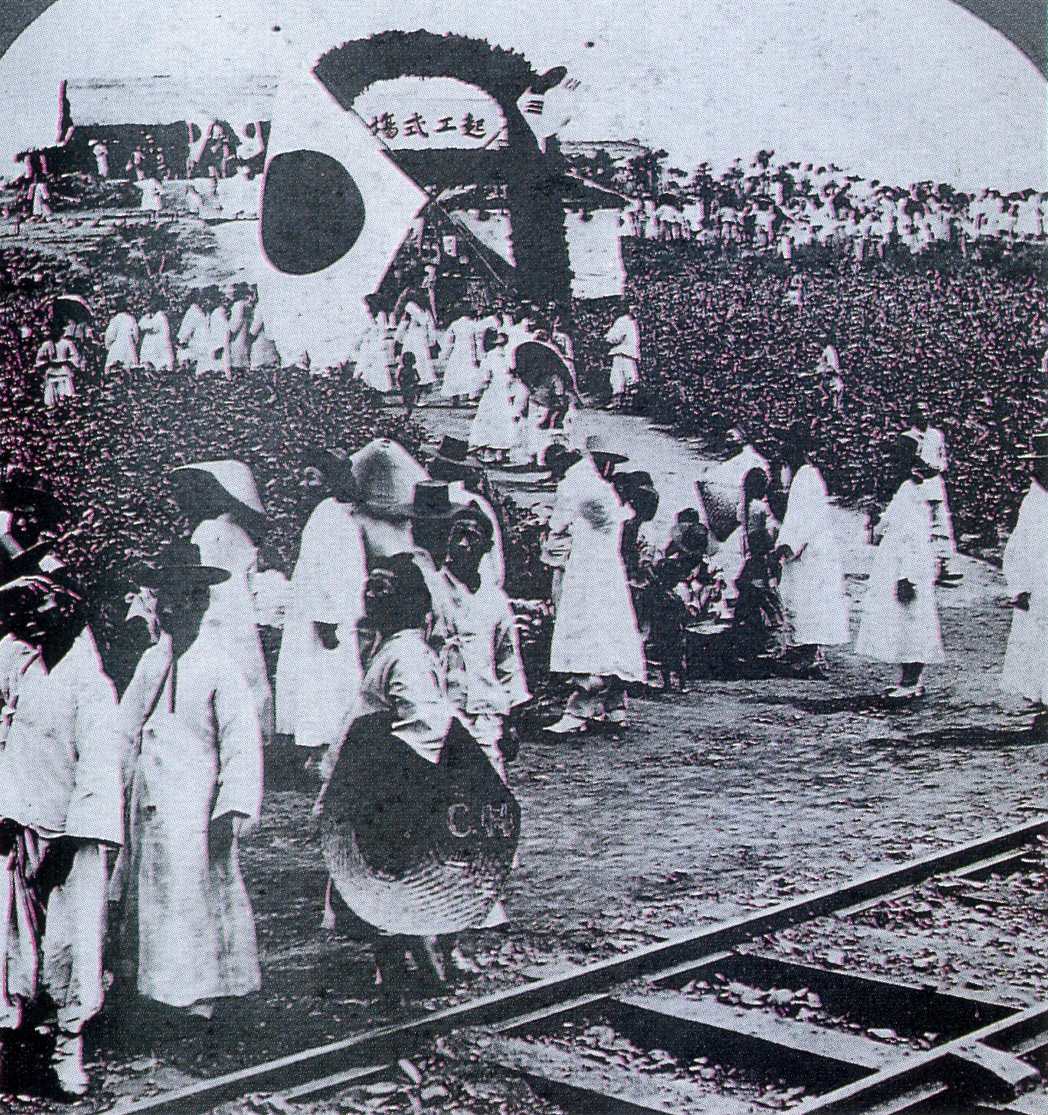
Groundbreaking celebration of the Keibu Railway (present Gyeongbu Line) from Keijō to Busan in 1901

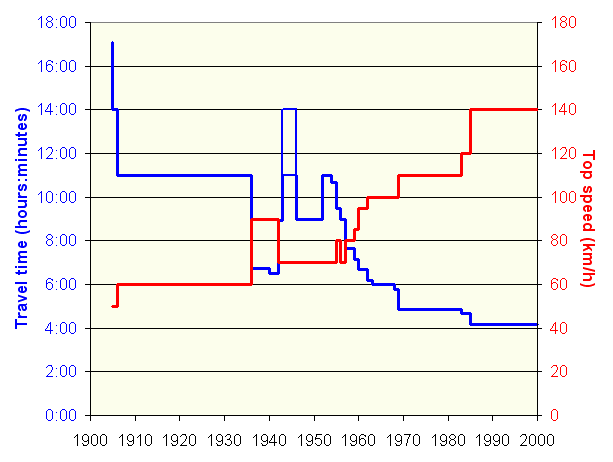
Evolution of shortest travel times and top speeds between Seoul and Busan on the Gyeongbu Line

In 1894–1895, the Empire of Japan and Qing China fought the First Sino-Japanese War for influence over Korea. Following the war, Japan competed with the Russian Empire's railway expansion in Northeast Asia, which led it to seek the right from the Korean Empire to build a railway from Busan to Keijō (the Japanese Empire's name for Seoul). This railway line was intended by Japan to solidify its strategic positions against Russia, with which it would later fight the war. Surveying began in 1896, and in spite of local protests, the Korean Empire gave Japan the right to build the line in 1898. Construction of the railway started on August 20, 1901, with a ceremony at Eitōho-ku, Keijō. Construction was supervised by the Japanese, with local Koreans commandeered into forced labor and paid in coupons.

Japan also sought to gain control of the Keigi Railway project that was to extend tracks further north, recognizing the trunk route as a means to keep Korea under its influence. After the outbreak of the Russo-Japanese War, Japan ignored Korea's declaration of neutrality and transported troops to Incheon. Japan also forced the Korean government to sign an agreement that ceded its control of the railway. Japanese military bases were established in connection with the railway, the biggest of them next to Ryūzan Station (modern-day Yomgsan Station) in Keijō.

The Gyeongbu Line was opened to the public on January 1, 1905, as the Keibu Railway (京釜鐵道, Keibu tetsudō). The first trains completed the rote in 17 hours 4 minutes. By April 1906, travel time was reduced to 11 hours, while top speed reached 60 km/h (37 mph). The line formed the backbone of transport in Korea under Japanese rule. Following the Japanese invasion of Manchuria, beginning on April 1, 1933, direct trains traversed the line from Busan to Andong (modern-day Dandong) across the border. Beginning on December 1, 1936, the Akatsuki luxury express trains ran on the line at a maximum speed of 90 km/h (56 mph), and achieved the shortest pre-war travel time of 6 hours 30 minutes on the timetable of November 1, 1940.

Travel times greatly improved when the line was used during World War II. Following World War II, the Seoul–Busan express train re-established on May 20, 1946, was named Chosun Liberator. During the Korean War, the line transported troops and refugees. The line remained the backbone of South Korea's transportation system after the war, with the introduction of the diesel locomotives and the cross-country Mugunghwa-ho train class. Following the 1961 coup, the Supreme Council for National Reconstruction initiated South Korea's first five-year plan, which included a construction program to complete the railway network, as a way to foster economic growth. On the Gyeongbu Line, the effort was promoted with a new class of express trains called Jaegeon-ho, (Reconstruction train) introduced on May 15, 1962. These trains reduced travel times below the best pre-WWII travel times for the first time, connecting Seoul and Busan in 6 hours 10 minutes at a top speed of 100 km/h (62 mph).

Beginning in the 1960s, road construction began to make road transportation more attractive and faster. Although the top speed rose to 110 km/h (68 mph) and the Seoul–Busan travel time along the Gyeongbu Line was reduced to 4 hours 50 minutes by June 10, 1969, travel time was only 4 to 4 1/2 hours on the parallel Gyeongbu Expressway, completed in 1970. Korean National Railroad responded by introducing the Saemaul-ho class of elevated-comfort express trains on August 15, 1974. With the introduction of the new streamlined diesel locomotives and then diesel multiple units in the Saemaul-ho service, top speed was raised to 140 km/h (87 mph) and travel time was reduced to 4 hours 10 minutes with the timetable valid by November 16, 1985.

== Upgrade ==
The Gyeongbu Line was widely improved in parallel with the development of the Seoul Metropolitan Subway urban rapid transit system and the Korea Train Express (KTX) high-speed rail system beginning in the 1970s.

The Gyeongbu Line is six-tracked from Seoul to Guro, four-tracked from Guro to Cheonan, and double-tracked from Cheonan all the way to Busan. The entire line is electrified.

=== Relationship with the KTX project ===
The Seoul–Busan axis is Korea's main traffic corridor. In 1995, it was home to 73.3% of Korea's population, and conducted 70% of the freight and 66% of passenger traffic. With both the Gyeongbu Expressway and Korail's Gyeongbu Line congested, the government saw the need to develop railways. The first proposals for a second Seoul-Busan railway line originated from a study conducted between 1972 and 1974 by experts from France's SNCF and Japan Railway Technical Service (JARTS) from a request from the IBRD. A more detailed 1978-1981 study by KAIST, focusing on the needs of freight transport, also came to the conclusion that the necessary capacity for freight transport on the existing Gyeongbu Line could best be released by separating off long-distance passenger traffic on a parallel high speed passenger railway, which was then taken up in Korea's next Five Year Plan.

Following the 1997 Asian financial crisis, the government decided to finish the Gyeongbu High Speed Railway (Gyeongbu HSR) in two phases, and upgrade and electrify the conventional Gyeongbu Line for KTX services on the sections paralleling the parts of the high-speed line not completed in the first phase.

Plans foresaw the development of the Gyeongbu Line into a high-capacity freight corridor after the completion of the second phase of the Gyeongbu HSR. At the time of the opening of the Daegu–Busan section of the high-speed line on November 1, 2010, capacity available for freight trains on the conventional line was expected to increase by a factor of 7.7, while the capacity for passenger transport in the entire corridor increased by a factor of 3.4.

=== Electrification ===
The line was electrified in stages from 1974 to 2006:

Section	Length	Start of electric operation	Notes
Seoul–Suwon	41.5 km	August 15, 1974	Integration into Seoul Subway Line 1
Yeongdeungpo–Suwon	32.3 km	December 23, 1981	Second pair of tracks
Yongsan–Guro	8.5 km	December 30, 1996	Third pair of tracks
Suwon–Byeongjeom	7.2 km	April 30, 2003	Four tracks; extension of Seoul Subway Line 1
Byeongjeom–Cheonan	48.4 km	January 20, 2005	Four tracks
Cheonan–Jochiwon	32.7 km	March 30, 2005	
Jochiwon–Daejeonjochajang	34.9 km	July 1, 2005	
Daejeonjochajang–Daejeon–Okcheon	20.7 km	April 1, 2004	For KTX trains
Okcheon–Sangdong	125.3 km	Dec 8, 2006	
Sangdong–Daegu–Busan	132.8 km	April 1, 2004	For KTX trains

For KTX trains and new electric locomotives, top speed was also raised to up to 150 km/h.

== Services ==
The Gyeongbu Line is the major route out of Seoul and Yongsan stations and, in addition to regular departures for Busan, trains travel along the Gyeongbu Line en route to Janghang, Gwangju, Mokpo, Suncheon, Yeosu, Pohang, Ulsan, Haeundae, Masan, and Jinju. Trains for Jecheon, Andong, and Yeongju also operate along sections of the Gyeongbu Line.

On the section between Seoul Station, Guro (where roughly half of the trains leave the Gyeongbu Line to head out to Incheon via the Gyeongin Line), Suwon, and Byeongjeom, Seoul Subway Line 1 provides frequent commuter services.

The Gyeongbu Line is served along its entire length by frequent intercity Saemaul-ho and cross-country Mugunghwa-ho trains. Some trains run along the entire length of the line, others only on some sections, including trains diverging to the connected lines. As of October 2010, direct Saemaul day trains connect Seoul to Busan in a minimum 4 hours 50 minutes, and Mughungwa trains in a minimum 5 hours 28 minutes.

=== KTX ===
Korail launched KTX high-speed services with the opening of the first phase of the Gyeongbu HSR on April 1, 2004. The Seoul–Busan travel distance was shortened to 408.5 km, the shortest travel time was 2 hours 40 minutes.

All KTX services use the conventional Gyeongbu Line between Seoul and the start of the Siheung Interconnection at a junction after Geumcheon-gu Office station, until the Siheung Interconnection diverges in a tunnel towards the present start of the Gyeongbu HSR. The terminal for most Gyeongbu KTX services is Seoul Station, for most Honam KTX services, Yongsan station. In addition, some trains continue beyond Seoul Station for 14.9 km along the Gyeongui Line to terminate at Haengsin station, next to which KTX trains have a depot. An additional stop at Yeongdeungpo station was proposed in 2004, however, the plans were dropped in face of opposition from locals living around Gwangmyeong station along the Gyeongbu HSR, who feared that Yeongdeungpo would draw away passengers from the new station and force its closing. However, the November 1, 2010, timetable change made Yeongdeungpo a KTX stop, for newly introduced trains that also use the Gyeongbu Line on the entire Seoul–Daejeon section, to serve Suwon.

From its opening, the Gyeongbu KTX service also returned to the Gyeongbu Line for two short sections crossing Daejeon and Daegu, where local disputes about the high-speed line alignment across urban areas held up construction; and all the way from Daegu to Busan. Consequently, all but two of the stations of the Gyeongbu KTX service were on the conventional Gyeongbu Line: after the two stations on the high-speed line, Gwangmyeong and Cheonan-Asan, stops were at Daejeon, Dongdaegu (East Daegu), Miryang, Gupo and Busan. Some Gyeongbu KTX services maintained service on this relation after the November 1, 2010, opening of the second phase of the Gyeongbu HSR, with the daily number of halts in Miryang and Gupo increased. Korail met local demands by introducing additional KTX services between Seoul and Dongdaegu in June 2007, which used the conventional Gyeongbu Line between Daejeon and Dongdaegu to serve Gimcheon and Gumi. However, these services were discontinued with the opening of the Gimcheon–Gumi station on the high-speed line.

The section between Daegu and Samnangjin, the junction with the Gyeongjeon Line, is also used by the Gyeongjeon KTX services, which connect Seoul to Masan on the Gyeongjeon Line since December 15, 2010, and will be extended to Jinju by 2012. Stops along the Gyeongbu Line will be at Dongdaegu and Miryang.

=== Evolution of long-distance passenger traffic ===
Between Seoul and Cheonan, the Mugunghwa and Saemaul express trains on the Gyeongbu Line gave rail around a fifth of the modal share before the launch of KTX services. Due to the short distance and the location of the KTX station outside the city, the conventional line could retain most of its passengers, and the increase in the total modal share of rail was modest. On the medium-distance relation from Seoul to Daejeon, KTX gained market share mostly at the expense of normal express services on the Gyeongbu Line, which decreased by half in the first year, while the total share of rail increased to a third. On the long-distance relations from Seoul to Daegu and Busan, the total share of rail increased from around two-fifths to a market dominating three-fifths, with the bulk of that traffic taken by the KTX. For intercity passenger traffic on the conventional Gyeongbu Line, that translates to a sharp drop on the Daejeon-Daegu section (bypassed by KTX trains) and a sharp increase on the Daegu-Busan section.

Railway modal share in intercity traffic
Seoul to...	Cheonan		Daejeon		Daegu		Busan	
Period	Total	Without KTX	Total	Without KTX	Total	Without KTX	Total	Without KTX
2003/4	21.1%	21.1%	27.5%	27.5%	40.5%	40.5%	38.0%	38.0%
2004/5	24.2%	19.2%	33.9%	14.0%	63.6%	11.4%	60.9%	10.6%

== Station list ==
●	Stops at the station
｜	Does not stop at the station
○	Limited service(Line 1), Some train stops(Long Distance)

Station	Hangul	Hanja	Seoul Subway Line 1		Long Distance Services			Connecting lines and services	Distance (km)		Location	
Station	Hangul	Hanja	L	R	KTX	ITX	Mugung -wha	Connecting lines and services	Station	Line	Location	
Seoul	서울		●	●	●	●	●	Gyeongbu HSR; Seoul Subway Line 4 AREX; GTX-A	-	0.0	Seoul	Jung-gu
Namyeong	남영	南營	●	●	｜	｜	｜	-	1.7		Seoul	Yongsan-gu
Yongsan	용산	龍山	●	●	● (Note: Only the Honam line KTX stops here, not Gyeongbu HSR KTX.)	●	●	Gyeongwon Line Yongsan Line; Honam Line; Honam KTX	1.5	3.2	Seoul	Yongsan-gu
Noryangjin	노량진	鷺梁津	●	●	｜	｜	｜	Seoul Subway Line 9	2.6	5.8	Seoul	Dongjak-gu
Daebang (Sungae Hospital)	대방 (성애병원)	大方	●	●	｜	｜	｜	-	1.5	7.3	Seoul	Yeongdeungpo-gu
Singil	신길	新吉	●	●	｜	｜	｜	Seoul Subway Line 5	0.8	8.1	Seoul	Yeongdeungpo-gu
Yeongdeungpo	영등포	永登浦	●	●	○ (Note: Only the KTX using conventional line between Seoul and Daejeon stops here)	●	●	Gyeongbu HSR	1.0	9.1	Seoul	Yeongdeungpo-gu
Sindorim	신도림	新道林	●	●	｜	｜	｜	Seoul Subway Line 2 Sinjeong Branch (Seoul Subway Line 2)	1.5	10.6	Seoul	Guro-gu
Guro	구로	九老	●	●	｜	｜	｜	Gyeongin Line (Seoul Subway Line 1)	1.1	11.7	Seoul	Guro-gu
Gasan Digital Complex (Mario Outlet)	가산디지털단지 (마리오아울렛)	加山디지털團地	●	●	｜	｜	｜	Seoul Subway Line 7	2.4	14.1	Seoul	Geumcheon-gu
Doksan	독산	禿山	●	｜	｜	｜	｜	-	2.0	16.1	Seoul	Geumcheon-gu
Geumcheon-gu Office	금천구청	衿川區廳	●	○	｜	｜	｜	Gwangmyeong Line (Seoul Subway Line 1)	1.2	17.3	Seoul	Geumcheon-gu
Seoksu	석수	石水	●	｜	｜	｜	｜	-	2.3	19.6	Gyeonggi-do	Anyang
Gwanak	관악	冠岳	●	｜	｜	｜	｜	-	1.9	21.5	Gyeonggi-do	Anyang
Anyang	안양	安養	●	●	｜	｜	○	-	2.4	23.9	Gyeonggi-do	Anyang
Myeonghak (Sungkyul Univ.)	명학 (성결대앞교)	鳴鶴	●	｜	｜	｜	｜	-	2.2	26.1	Gyeonggi-do	Anyang
Geumjeong	금정	衿井	●	●	｜	｜	｜	Gwacheon Line (Seoul Subway Line 4); Ansan Line (Seoul Subway Line 4)	1.4	27.5	Gyeonggi-do	Gunpo
Gunpo	군포	軍浦	●	｜	｜	｜	｜	-	2.2	29.7	Gyeonggi-do	Gunpo
Dangjeong (Hansei Univ.)	당정 (한세대)	堂井	●	｜	｜	｜	｜	-	1.6	31.3	Gyeonggi-do	Gunpo
Uiwang (Korea Nat'l Univ. of Transportation)	의왕 (한국교통대학교)	義王	●	○	｜	｜	｜	Seoul Subway Line 1 Nambu Hwamulgiji Line	4.2	33.9	Gyeonggi-do	Uiwang
Sungkyunkwan Univ.	성균관대	成均館大	●	●	｜	｜	｜	-	2.9	36.8	Gyeonggi-do	Suwon
Hwaseo	화서	華西	●	｜	｜	｜	｜	-	2.6	39.4	Gyeonggi-do	Suwon
Suwon	수원	水原	●	●	○	●	●	Gyeongbu HSR; Suin-Bundang Line	2.1	41.5	Gyeonggi-do	Suwon
Seryu	세류	細柳	●	｜	｜	｜	｜	-	2.9	44.4	Gyeonggi-do	Suwon
Byeongjeom (Hanshin Univ.)	병점 (한신대)	餅店	●	●	｜	｜	｜	Byeongjeomgiji Line (Seoul Subway Line 1)	4.3	48.7	Gyeonggi-do	Hwaseong
Sema	세마	洗馬	●	｜	｜	｜	｜	-	2.4	51.1	Gyeonggi-do	Osan
Osan College	오산대	烏山大	●	｜	｜	｜	｜	-	2.7	53.8	Gyeonggi-do	Osan
Osan	오산	烏山	●	●	｜	｜	○	-	2.7	56.5	Gyeonggi-do	Osan
Jinwi	진위	振威	●	｜	｜	｜	｜	-	4.0	60.5	Gyeonggi-do	Pyeongtaek
Songtan	송탄	松炭	●	｜	｜	｜	｜	-	3.8	64.3	Gyeonggi-do	Pyeongtaek
Seojeong-ri (Kookje College)	서정리 (국제대학)	西井里	●	●	｜	｜	○	-	2.2	66.5	Gyeonggi-do	Pyeongtaek
PyeongtaekJije (Korea Nat'l Univ. of Welfare)	평택지제 (한국복지대학)	平澤芝制	●	｜	｜	｜	｜	Suseo-Pyeongtaek HSR	4.8	71.3	Gyeonggi-do	Pyeongtaek
Pyeongtaek	평택	平澤	●	●	｜	○	●	Pyeongtaek Line	3.7	75.0	Gyeonggi-do	Pyeongtaek
Seonghwan (Namseoul Univ.)	성환 (남서울대)	成歡	●	●	｜	｜	○	-	9.4	84.4	Chungcheongnam-do	Cheonan
Jiksan	직산	稷山	●	｜	｜	｜	｜	-	5.4	89.8	Chungcheongnam-do	Cheonan
Dujeong	두정	斗井	●	●	｜	｜	｜	-	3.8	93.6	Chungcheongnam-do	Cheonan
Cheonan	천안	天安	●	●	｜	●	●	Janghang Line; Anseong Line (Closed)	3.0	96.6	Chungcheongnam-do	Cheonan
Sojeong-ri	소정리	小井里	No Seoul Subway Line 1 Service		｜	｜	｜	-	10.8	107.4	Sejong City	
Jeonui	전의	全義	No Seoul Subway Line 1 Service		｜	｜	○	-	7.5	114.9	Sejong City	
Jeondong	전동	全東	No Seoul Subway Line 1 Service		｜	｜	｜	-	7.7	122.6	Sejong City	
Seochang	서창	瑞倉	No Seoul Subway Line 1 Service		｜	｜	｜	Osong Line	3.5	126.1	Sejong City	
Jochiwon	조치원	鳥致院	No Seoul Subway Line 1 Service		｜	○	●	Chungbuk Line	3.2	129.3	Sejong City	
Naepan	내판	內板	No Seoul Subway Line 1 Service		｜	｜	｜	-	5.6	134.9	Sejong City	
Bugang	부강	芙江	No Seoul Subway Line 1 Service		｜	｜	○	-	4.9	139.8	Sejong City	
Maepo	매포	梅浦	No Seoul Subway Line 1 Service		｜	｜	｜	-	4.6	144.4	Sejong City	
Sintanjin	신탄진	新灘津	No Seoul Subway Line 1 Service		｜	○	○	-	7.5	151.9	Daejeon	Daedeok-gu
Hoedeok	회덕	懷德	No Seoul Subway Line 1 Service		｜	｜	｜	-	5.6	157.5	Daejeon	Daedeok-gu
Daejeonjochajang	대전조차장	大田操車場	No Seoul Subway Line 1 Service		｜	｜	｜	Honam Line	4.1	161.6	Daejeon	Daedeok-gu
Daejeon	대전	大田	No Seoul Subway Line 1 Service		●	●	●	Gyeongbu HSR; Daejeon Line ● Daejeon Subway Line 1	4.7	166.3	Daejeon	Dong-gu
Secheon	세천	細川	No Seoul Subway Line 1 Service		｜	｜	｜	-	7.6	173.6	Daejeon	Dong-gu
Jeungyak (Closed)	증약	增若	No Seoul Subway Line 1 Service		｜	｜	｜	-	-		Chungcheongbuk-do	Okcheon-gun
Okcheon	옥천	沃川	No Seoul Subway Line 1 Service		｜	○	○	-	8.0	182.5	Chungcheongbuk-do	Okcheon-gun
Gapung (Closed)	가풍	加豊	No Seoul Subway Line 1 Service		｜	｜	｜	-	-		Chungcheongbuk-do	Okcheon-gun
Iwon	이원	伊院	No Seoul Subway Line 1 Service		｜	｜	○	-	8.3	190.8	Chungcheongbuk-do	Okcheon-gun
Jitan	지탄	池灘	No Seoul Subway Line 1 Service		｜	｜	○	-	5.6	196.4	Chungcheongbuk-do	Okcheon-gun
Simcheon	심천	深川	No Seoul Subway Line 1 Service		｜	｜	○	-	4.4	200.8	Chungcheongbuk-do	Yeongdong-gun
Gakgye	각계	覺溪	No Seoul Subway Line 1 Service		｜	｜	○	-	3.8	204.6	Chungcheongbuk-do	Yeongdong-gun
Yeongdong	영동	永同	No Seoul Subway Line 1 Service		｜	○	●	-	7.0	211.6	Chungcheongbuk-do	Yeongdong-gun
Mireuk (Closed)	미륵	彌勒	No Seoul Subway Line 1 Service		｜	｜	｜	-	-		Chungcheongbuk-do	Yeongdong-gun
Hwanggan	황간	黃澗	No Seoul Subway Line 1 Service		｜	｜	○	-	14.6	226.2	Chungcheongbuk-do	Yeongdong-gun
Chupungnyeong	추풍령	秋風嶺	No Seoul Subway Line 1 Service		｜	｜	○	-	8.5	234.7	Chungcheongbuk-do	Yeongdong-gun
Sinam	신암	新岩	No Seoul Subway Line 1 Service		｜	｜	｜	-	6.0	240.7	Gyeongsangbuk-do	Gimcheon
Jikjisa	직지사	直指寺	No Seoul Subway Line 1 Service		｜	｜	｜	-	5.5	246.2	Gyeongsangbuk-do	Gimcheon
Gimcheon	김천	金泉	No Seoul Subway Line 1 Service		｜	●	●	Gyeongbuk Line	7.6	253.8	Gyeongsangbuk-do	Gimcheon
Daesin	대신	大新	No Seoul Subway Line 1 Service		｜	｜	｜	-	9.7	263.5	Gyeongsangbuk-do	Gimcheon
Apo	아포	牙浦	No Seoul Subway Line 1 Service		｜	｜	｜	-	5.7	269.2	Gyeongsangbuk-do	Gimcheon
Gumi	구미	龜尾	No Seoul Subway Line 1 Service		｜	●	●	Daegyeong Line	7.5	276.7	Gyeongsangbuk-do	Gumi
Sagok	사곡	沙谷	No Seoul Subway Line 1 Service		｜	｜	｜	Daegyeong Line	4.6	281.3	Gyeongsangbuk-do	Gumi
Yangmok	약목	若木	No Seoul Subway Line 1 Service		｜	｜	○	-	8.2	289.5	Gyeongsangbuk-do	Chilgok-gun
Waegwan	왜관	倭館	No Seoul Subway Line 1 Service		｜	○	●	Daegyeong Line	6.5	296.0	Gyeongsangbuk-do	Chilgok-gun
Yeonhwa	연화	蓮花	No Seoul Subway Line 1 Service		｜	｜	｜	-	6.2	302.2	Gyeongsangbuk-do	Chilgok-gun
Sindong	신동	新洞	No Seoul Subway Line 1 Service		｜	｜	｜	-	3.7	305.9	Gyeongsangbuk-do	Chilgok-gun
Jicheon	지천	枝川	No Seoul Subway Line 1 Service		｜	｜	｜	-	7.4	313.3	Gyeongsangbuk-do	Chilgok-gun
Seodaegu	서대구	西大邱	No Seoul Subway Line 1 Service		○ (Note: KTX trains via Seodaegu partially uses conventional Gyeongbu Line before merging with Gyeongbu HSR.)	｜	｜	Daegyeong Line	5.6	318.9	Daegu	Seo-gu
Daegu	대구	大邱	No Seoul Subway Line 1 Service		｜	●	●	Daegyeong Line; Daegu Subway Line 1	4.2	323.1	Daegu	Buk-gu
Dongdaegu	동대구	東大邱	No Seoul Subway Line 1 Service		●	●	●	Gyeongbu HSR; Daegu Line; Daegyeong Line; Daegu Subway Line 1	3.2	326.3	Daegu	Dong-gu
Gomo	고모	顧母	No Seoul Subway Line 1 Service		｜	｜	｜	-	5.5	331.8	Daegu	Suseong-gu
Gacheon	가천	佳川	No Seoul Subway Line 1 Service		｜	｜	｜	Daegu Line	1.6	333.4	Daegu	Suseong-gu
Gyeongsan	경산	慶山	No Seoul Subway Line 1 Service		○	○	●	Daegyeong Line	5.2	338.6	Gyeongsangbuk-do	Gyeongsan
Samseong	삼성	三省	No Seoul Subway Line 1 Service		｜	｜	｜	-	7.1	345.7	Gyeongsangbuk-do	Gyeongsan
Namseonghyeon	남성현	南省峴	No Seoul Subway Line 1 Service		｜	｜	○	-	7.4	353.1	Gyeongsangbuk-do	Cheongdo-gun
Cheongdo	청도	淸道	No Seoul Subway Line 1 Service		｜	○	●	-	8.7	361.8	Gyeongsangbuk-do	Cheongdo-gun
Singeo	신거	新巨	No Seoul Subway Line 1 Service		｜	｜	｜	-	5.6	367.4	Gyeongsangbuk-do	Cheongdo-gun
Sangdong	상동	上東	No Seoul Subway Line 1 Service		｜	｜	○	-	4.8	372.2	Gyeongsangnam-do	Miryang
Miryang	밀양	密陽	No Seoul Subway Line 1 Service		○	○	●	Gyeongbu HSR	9.4	381.6	Gyeongsangnam-do	Miryang
Muwol (Closed)	무월	無月	No Seoul Subway Line 1 Service		｜	｜	｜	-	-		Gyeongsangnam-do	Miryang
Mijeon	미전	美田	No Seoul Subway Line 1 Service		｜	｜	｜	Mijeon Line	11.0	392.6	Gyeongsangnam-do	Miryang
Samnangjin	삼량진	三浪津	No Seoul Subway Line 1 Service		｜	○	○	Gyeongjeon Line	1.5	394.1	Gyeongsangnam-do	Miryang
Wondong	원동	院洞	No Seoul Subway Line 1 Service		｜	｜	○	-	9.1	403.2	Gyeongsangnam-do	Yangsan
Mulgeum	물금	勿禁	No Seoul Subway Line 1 Service		｜	○	○	-	9.2	412.4	Gyeongsangnam-do	Yangsan
Hwamyeong	화명	華明	No Seoul Subway Line 1 Service		｜	｜	○	Busan Subway Line 2	9.4	421.8	Busan	Buk-gu
Gupo	구포	龜浦	No Seoul Subway Line 1 Service		○	●	●	Gyeongbu HSR; Busan Subway Line 3	3.4	425.2	Busan	Buk-gu
Sasang	사상	沙上	No Seoul Subway Line 1 Service		｜	｜	○	Gaya Line; Busan Subway Line 2	5.1	430.3	Busan	Sasang-gu
Busanjin	부산진	釜山鎭	No Seoul Subway Line 1 Service		｜	｜	｜	Donghae Line; Busan Subway Line 1	9.6	439.9	Busan	Busanjin-gu
Busan	부산	釜山	No Seoul Subway Line 1 Service		●	●	●	Gyeongbu HSR; Busan Subway Line 1	1.8	441.7	Busan	Dong-gu

== See also ==
- Korail
