= Sojeong-ri station =

Train station in South Korea

Coordinates: 36°43′7.12″N 127°9′20.28″E

소정리
Sojeong-ri
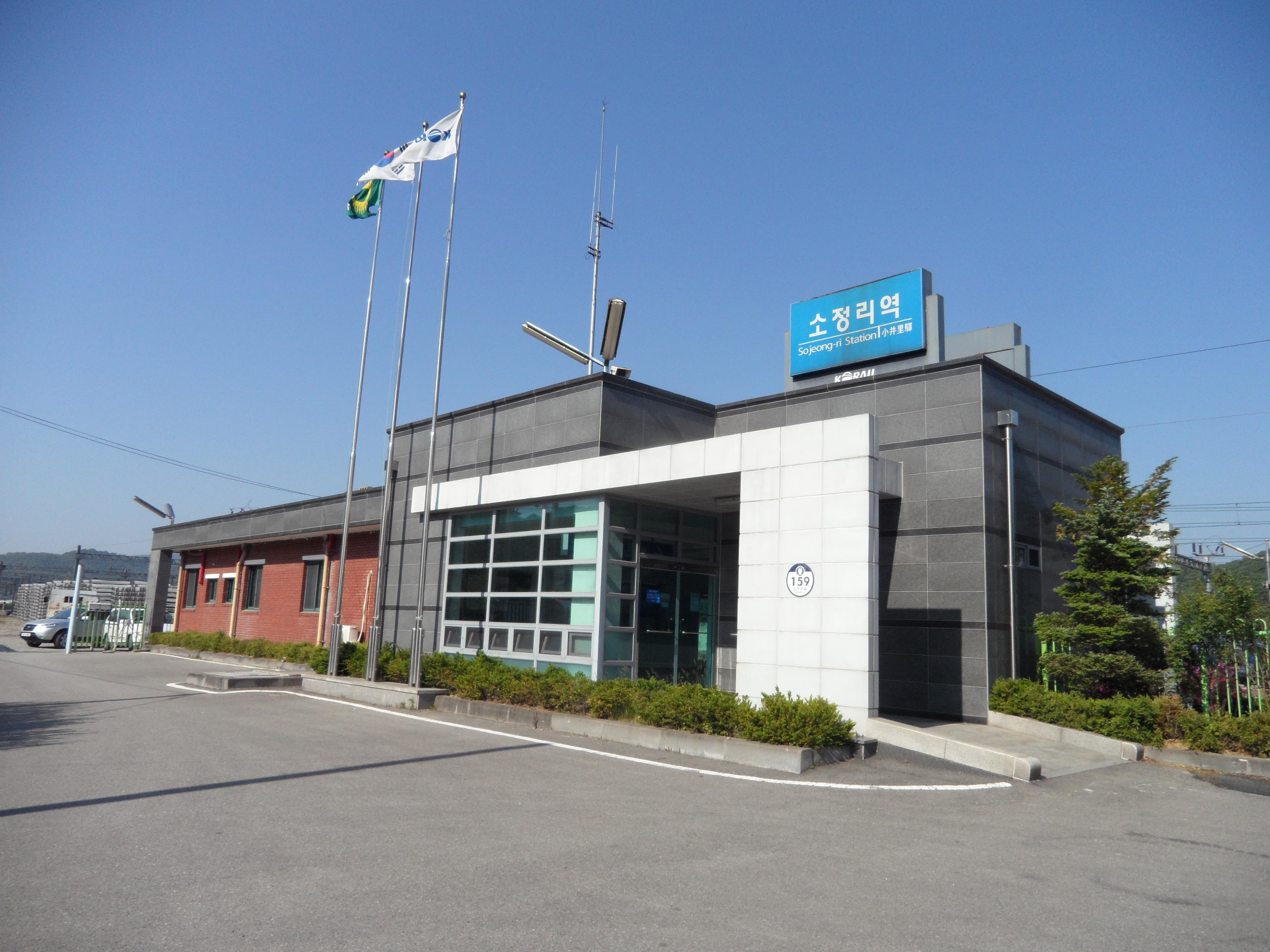

Korean name
- Hangul: 소정리역
- Hanja: 小井里驛
- Revised Romanization: Sojeongni-yeok
- McCune–Reischauer: Sojŏngni-yŏk

General information
- Platforms: 0
- Tracks: 0

Passengers
- (Daily) Based on January–June 2011. KR: 16
Location

Sojeong-ri station is a railway station in Sojeong-myeon, Sejong City, South Korea.

== Station ==
This station is on the Gyeongbu Line, with 2 platforms for 4 tracks. Because of the fire on March 30, 2004, the station building was reconstructed.

Only 2 Mugunghwa-ho trains stopped at Sojeong-ri station until July 1, 2017.
