= Gomo station =

Train station in South Korea

Coordinates: 35°51′32″N 128°40′43″E

고모
Gomo
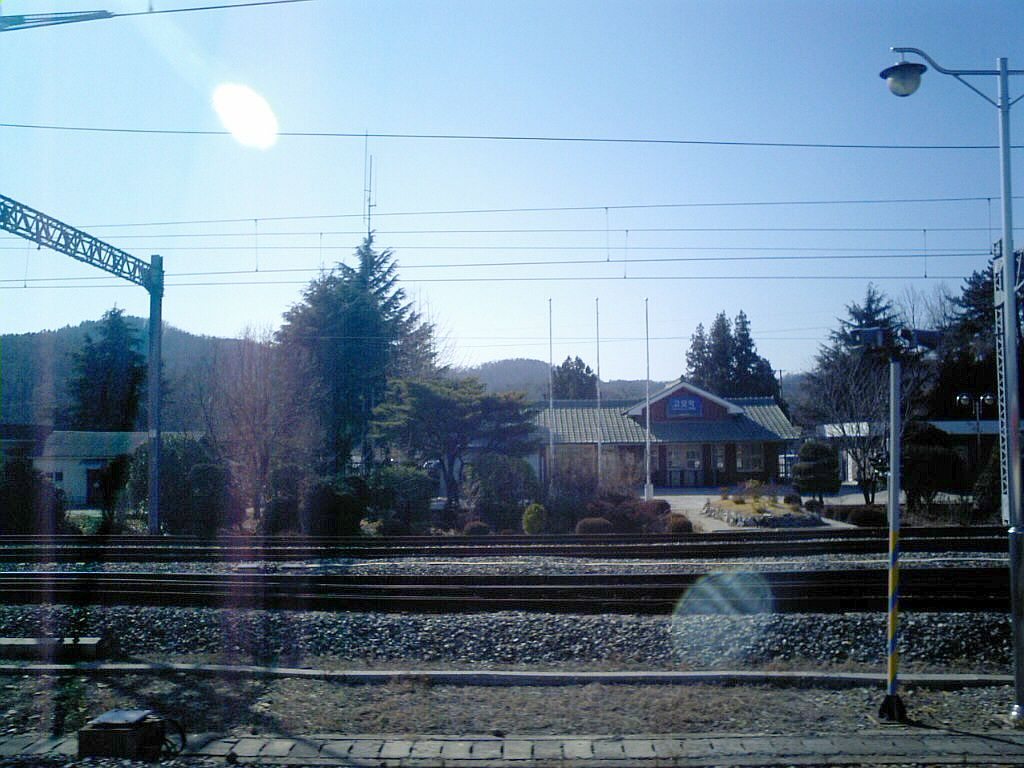

General information
- Location: 208 Gomo-ro, Suseong District, Daegu; South Korea
- Line: Gyeongbu Line

History
- Opened: November 1, 1925
- Closed: 2006
Location

Gomo station (Korean: 고모) was a railway station on the Gyeongbu Line in South Korea. It began operations in 1925, ended passenger operations in 2004, and ended freight operations in 2006, when it closed. In 2018, it was turned into a cultural space.
