= Yeonhwa station =

Train station in South Korea

Coordinates: 35°57′54″N 128°26′50″E

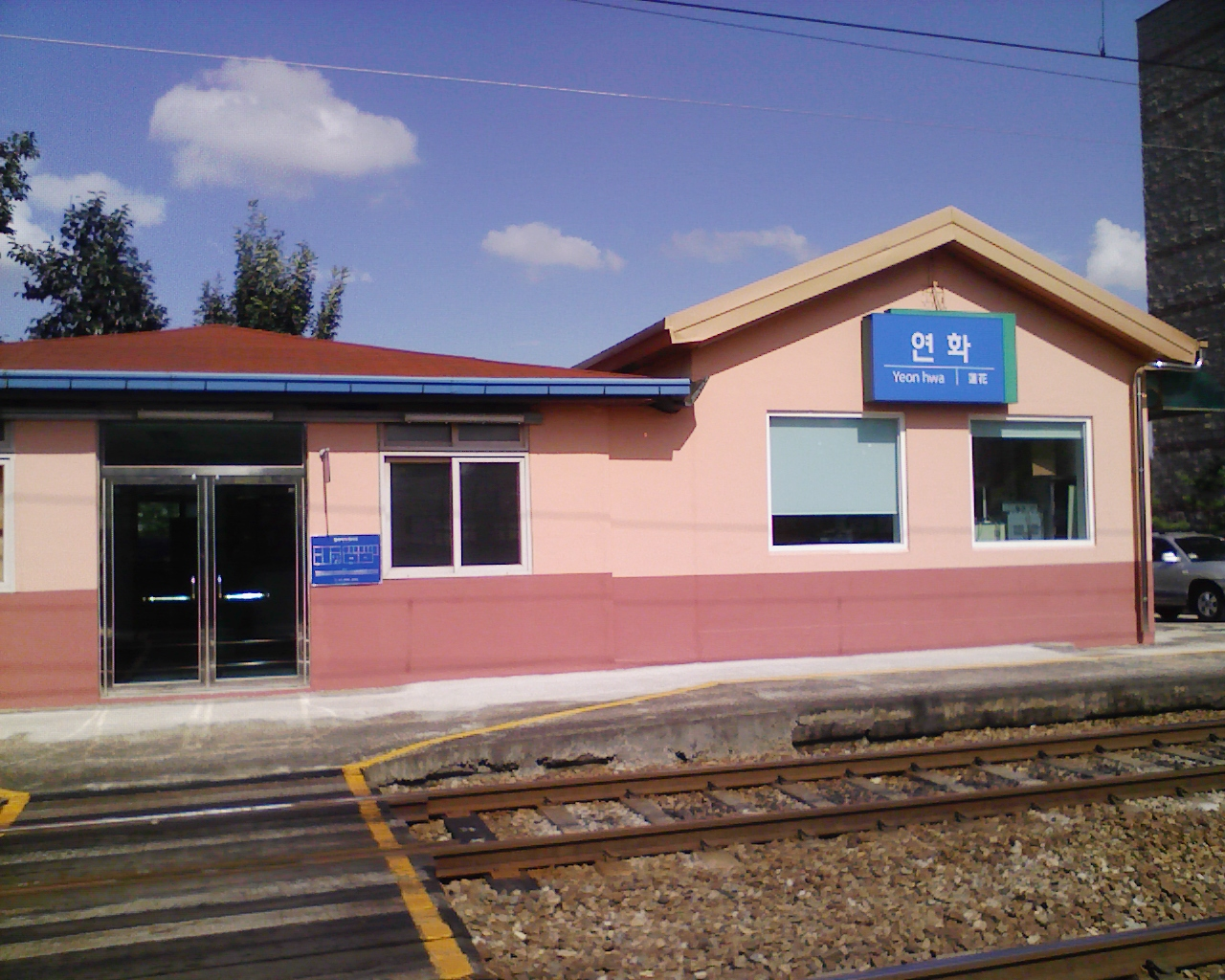
KORAIL Yeonhwa Station building

Yeonhwa station is a railway station on the Gyeongbu Line that was opened on 8 April 1966 in Chilgok County in North Gyeongsang Province.
