= Maepo station =

Train station in South Korea

Coordinates: 36°29′56″N 127°23′27″E

매포
Maepo
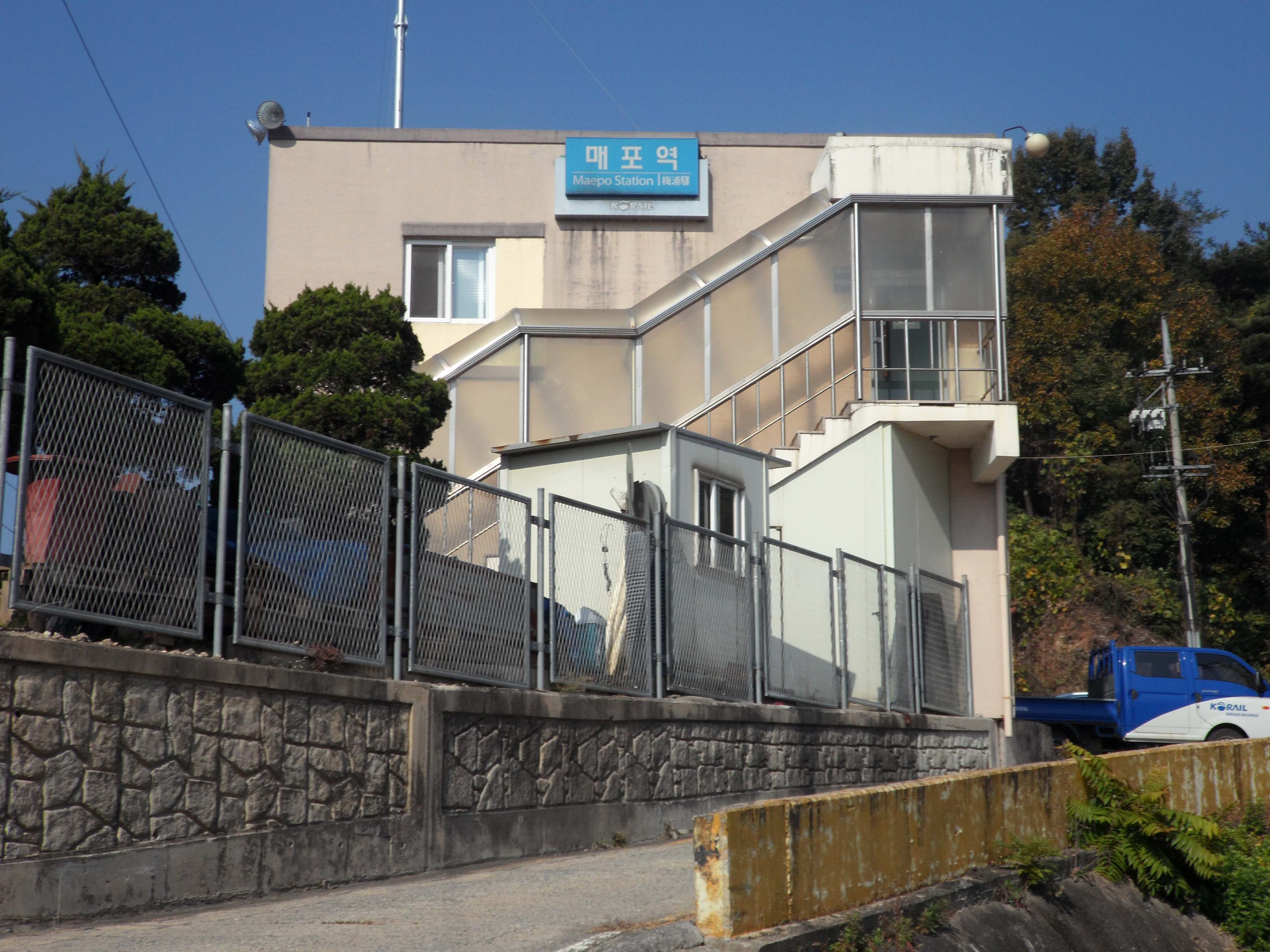

Korean name
- Hangul: 매포역
- Hanja: 梅浦驛
- Revised Romanization: Maepo-yeok
- McCune–Reischauer: Maep'o-yŏk
Location

Maepo station is a railway station on the Gyeongbu Line in Bugang-myeon, Sejong City, South Korea.
