= Hoedeok station =

Railway station in South Korea

Coordinates: 36°24′09″N 127°25′18″E

회덕
Hoedeok
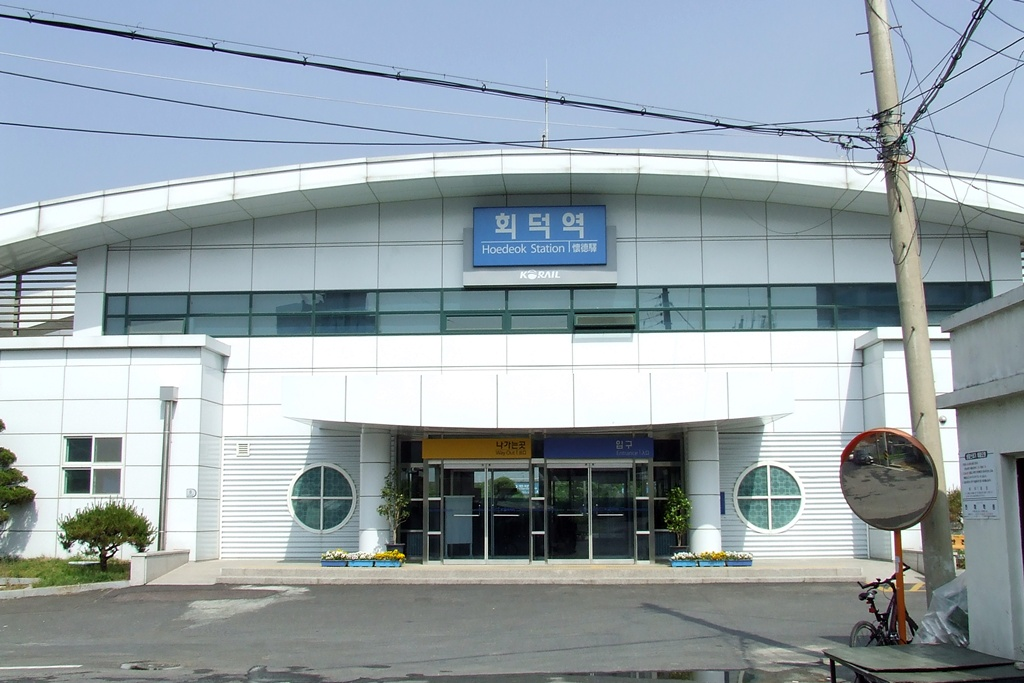

Korean name
- Hangul: 회덕역
- Hanja: 懷德驛
- Revised Romanization: Hoedeok-yeok
- McCune–Reischauer: Hoedŏk-yŏk

General information
- Platforms: 0
- Tracks: 0
Location

Hoedeok station (Korean: 회덕역; Hanja: 懷德驛) is a railway station on the Gyeongbu Line in South Korea.

A new tram extension to the station is expected to Jinjamnegeori by 2028.

== Gallery ==
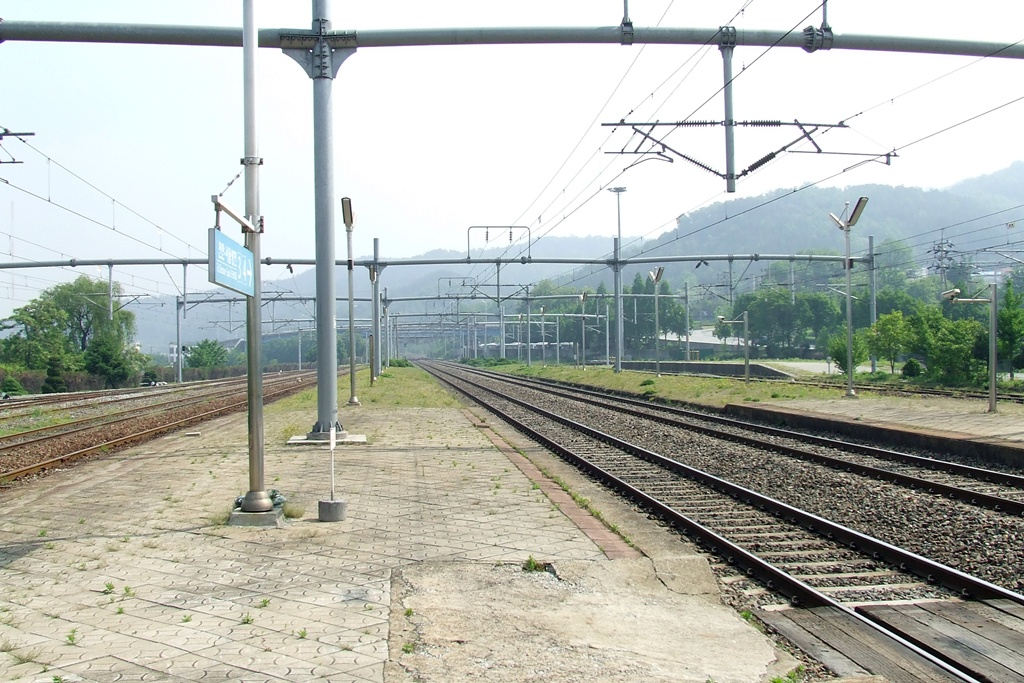

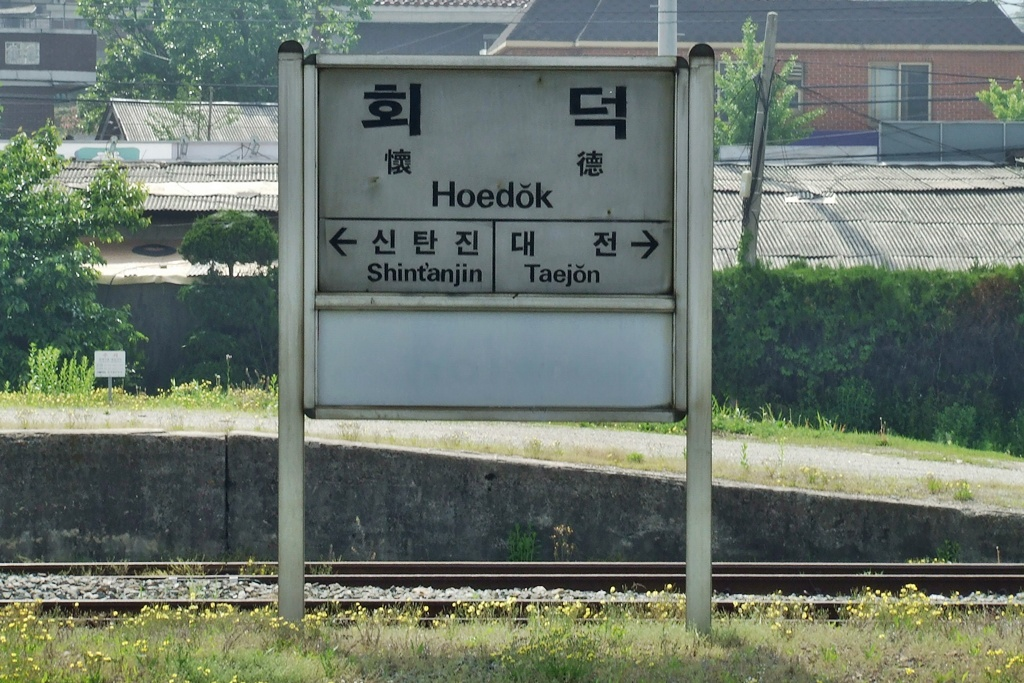
