= Apo station =

Train station in South Korea

Coordinates: 36°09′31″N 128°15′26″E

아포
Apo
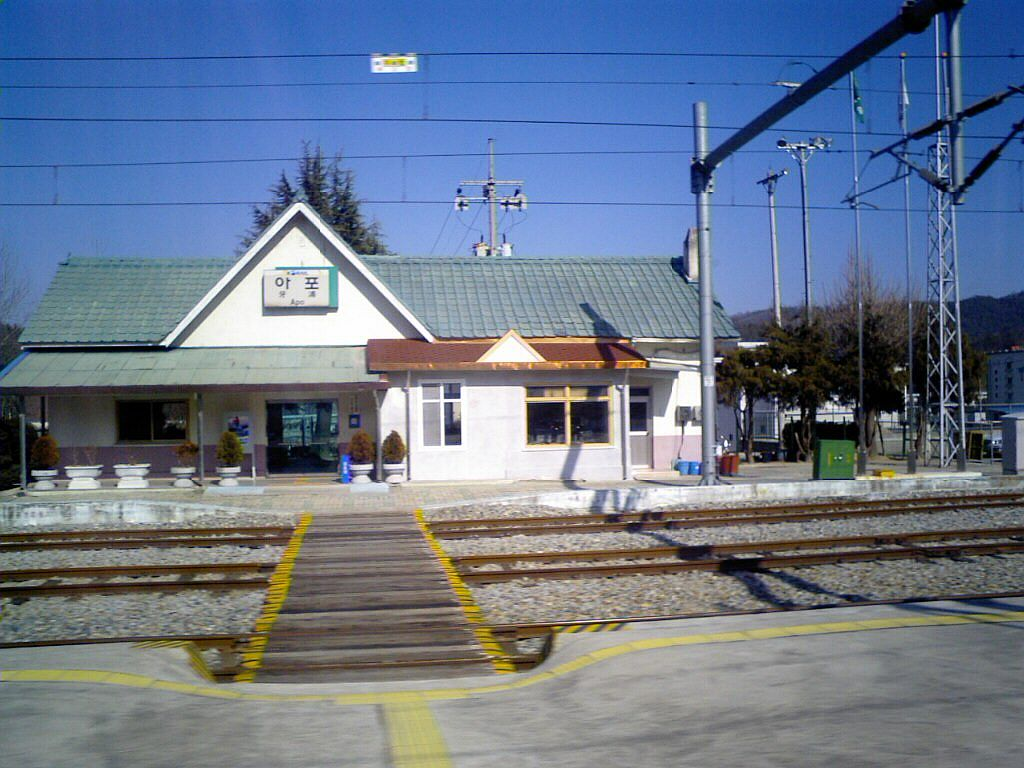

General information
- Line: Gyeongbu Line

History
- Opened: November 1, 1916
Location

Apo station (Korean: 아포역; Hanja: 牙浦驛) is a railway station located in Gimcheon, South Korea, along the Gyeongbu Line.
