= Munsu station =

Railway station in Yeongju, South Korea

Munsu station is a railway station in Munsu-myeon, the city of Yeongju, South Korea. It is on the Jungang Line.
