= Jeondong station =

Train station in South Korea

Coordinates: 36°39′15″N 127°15′55″E

전동
Jeondong
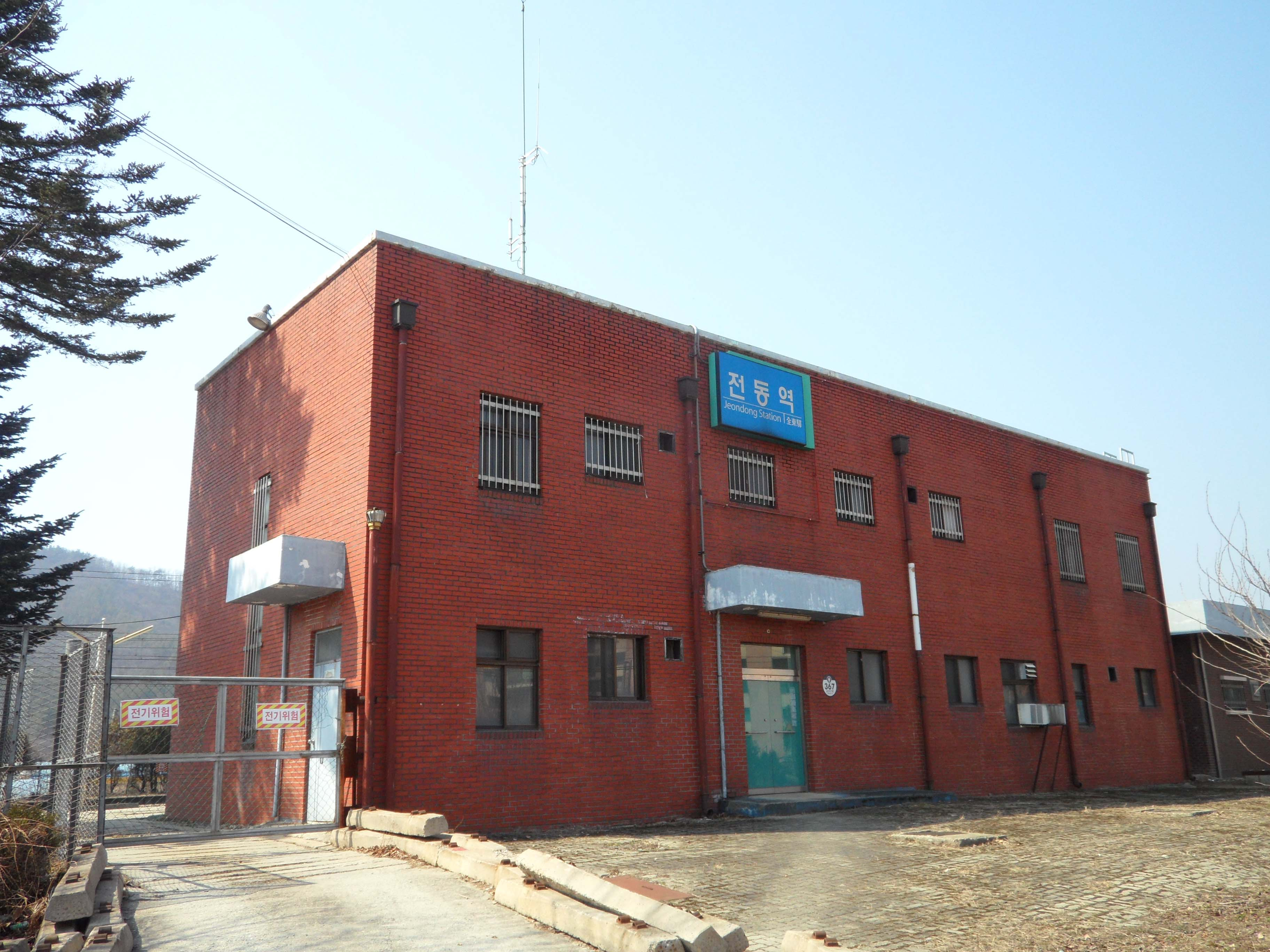

Korean name
- Hangul: 전동역
- Hanja: 全東驛
- Revised Romanization: Jeondong-yeok
- McCune–Reischauer: Chŏndong-yŏk

General information
- Platforms: 0
- Tracks: 0
Location

Jeondong station is a non-passenger railway station in Jeondong-myeon, Sejong City, South Korea.

== History ==
The station opened as a temporary station on November 1st, 1925. On February 16th, 1939, the station began handling small parcels and cargo. On August 1st, 2005, the station began offering passenger transport, which would cease 3 years later, with the station closing to passengers on March 10th, 2008.
