= Hwabon station =

Railway station in Daegu, South Korea

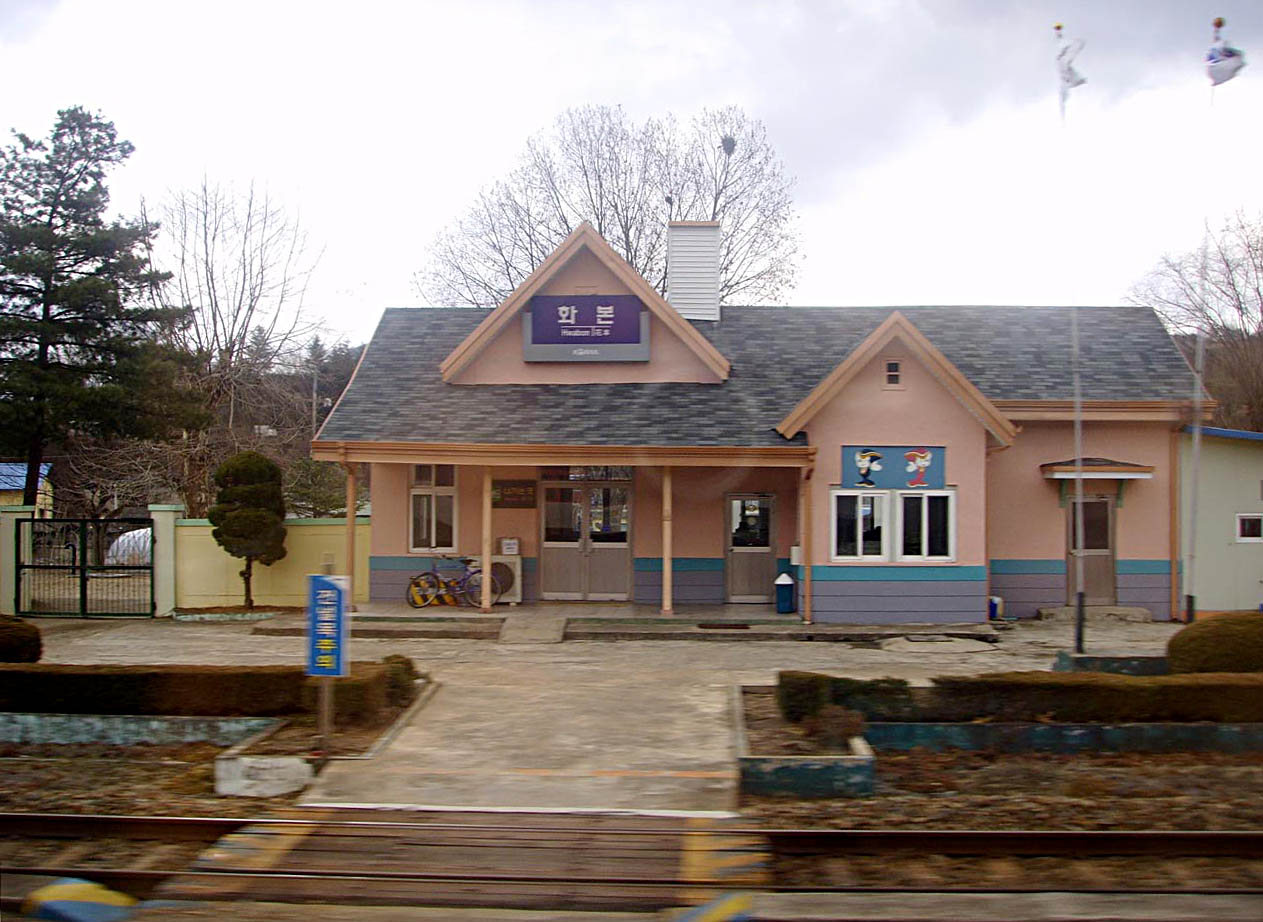

Korean name
- Hangul: 화본역
- Hanja: 花本驛
- Revised Romanization: Hwabonnyeok
- McCune–Reischauer: Hwabonnyŏk

General information
- Location: Hwabon-ri, Sanseong-myeon, Gunwi, Daegu; South Korea
- Coordinates: 36°7′37.35″N 128°41′39.88″E
- Operator: Korail
- Line: Jungang Line

Construction
- Structure type: Aboveground

History
- Opened: February 1, 1938
- Closed: December 20, 2024
Location

Hwabon station, located in Saneom-ro, Hwabon-ri, Daegu Metropolitan City's Gunwi County, began operations on December 1, 1938, as a regular station on the Jungang Line. The name "Hwabon" originates from the local belief that the nearby Jorim Mountain's flowers and roots symbolize the essence of beauty, translating to "the root of flowers." Known as "the most beautiful small station in Korea," Hwabon station is beloved for its nostalgic charm and picturesque setting.

The station's current building was completed in December 1936. Originally serving both passenger and freight traffic, freight operations ceased on May 1, 1977, followed by the discontinuation of parcel services in 1990. Over the decades, the station underwent several renovations, including a roof restoration in 2006 and a major remodeling in 2011. Despite its historical significance, Hwabon station's role has diminished in recent years, with its status officially downgraded to a "driver-only station" in 2021, where passengers must purchase tickets onboard trains or via mobile apps.

In September 2024, it was announced that the station would permanently close following its final day of operation on December 15, 2024. The station will be replaced by Gunwi station after the Andong–Yeongcheon section of the Jungang line is relocated on December 21, 2024. As of 2024, Hwabon station serves six daily trains, including Mugunghwa-class trains on routes connecting major destinations like Cheongnyangni and Busan.

Following its closure, the surrounding railway lines was announced to be dismantled, while leaving the station intact.

The station also houses a historic water tower designated as a semi-official railway monument. Nearby, old Saemaeul passenger cars have been repurposed into a café and storage space. A small admission fee allows visitors to explore the station's facilities, including its waiting room adorned with a hand-crafted mosaic ceiling.

== Media appearances ==
Hwabon station has been featured in various films, dramas, and programs, such as "Little Forest" and 1 Night 2 Days. Despite its popularity, visitors were advised to follow safety regulations and avoid taking photos on the tracks, as trains and freight traffic continue to operate regularly. Violations of these rules resulted in multiple cases of fines.
