= Jikjisa station =

Train station in South Korea

Coordinates: 36°07′30″N 128°02′23″E

Jikjisa (Korean: 직지사; Hanja: 直指寺) station is a railway station on the Gyeongbu Line in South Korea.
