= Jicheon station =

Train stop in South Korea

Coordinates: 35°53′51″N 128°30′01″E

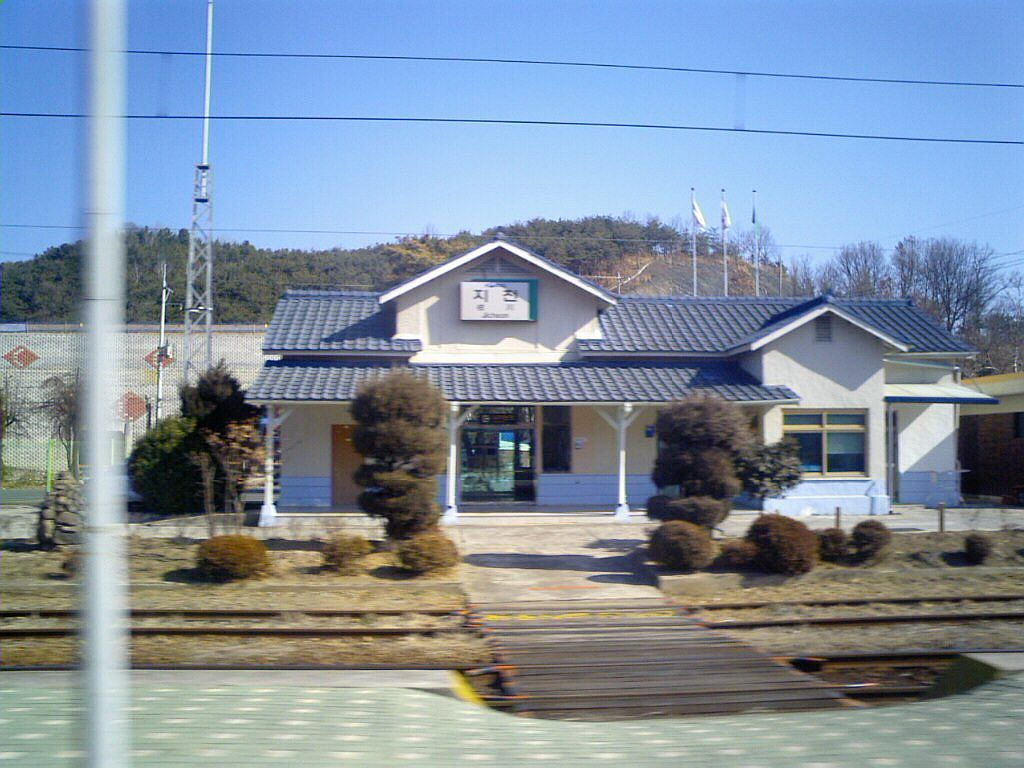

Jicheon station is a railway station in South Korea on the Gyeongbu Line.
