= Daesin station =

Train station in South Korea

Coordinates: 36°09′10″N 128°11′47″E

Daesin station is a railway station on the Gyeongbu Line.
