= Seojeong-ri station =

Train station in South Korea

Coordinates: 37°03′23″N 127°03′14″E

서정리 (국제대학)
Seojeong-ri
(Kookje College)
서정리 (국제대학); Seojeong-ri (Kookje College)
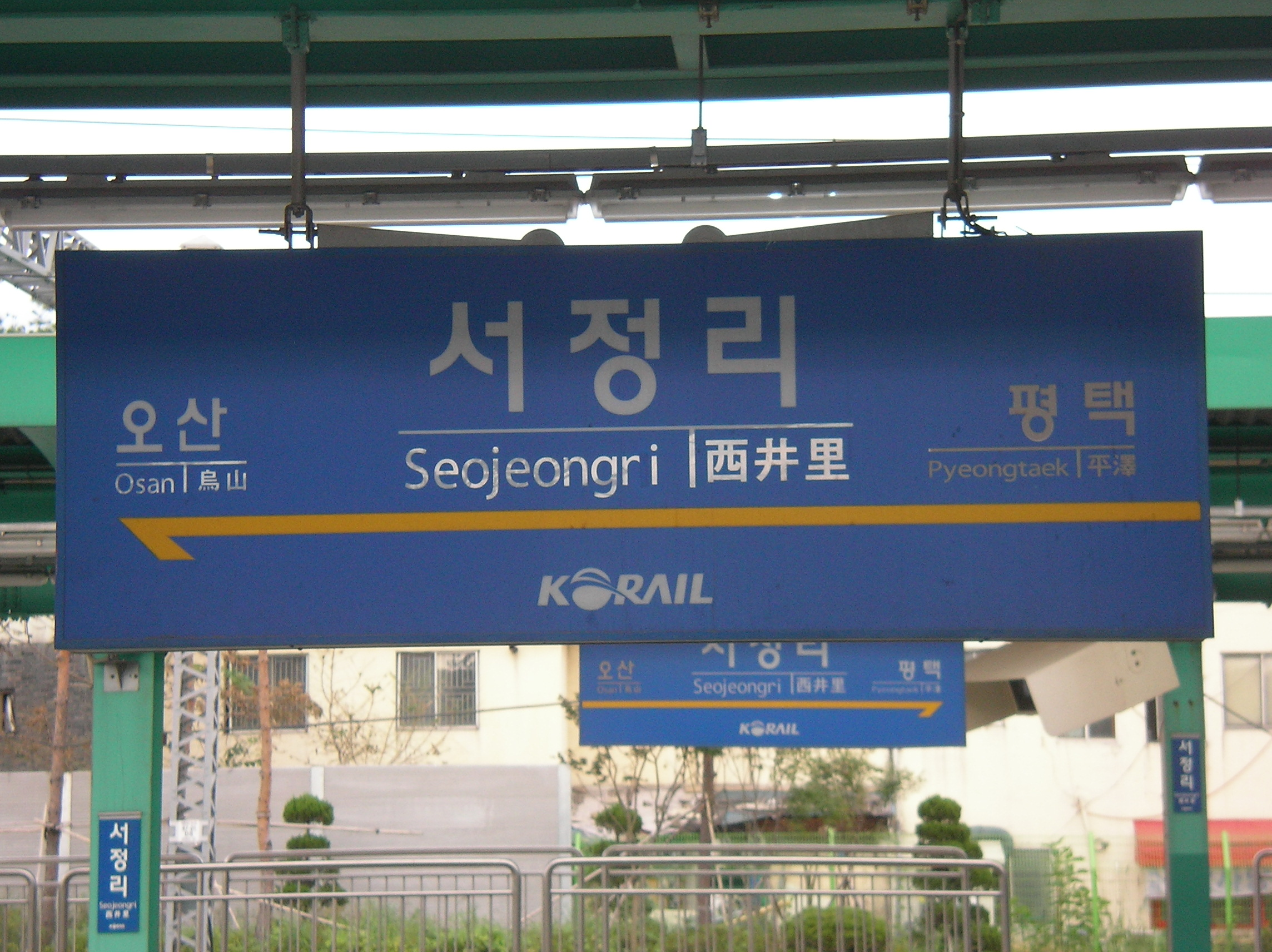
- Station nameplate (mainline trains)

Korean name
- Hangul: 서정리역
- Hanja: 西井里驛
- Revised Romanization: Seojeongni-yeok
- McCune–Reischauer: Sŏjŏngni-yŏk

General information
- Location: 427-1 Seojeong-dong, 51 Tanhyeonno, Pyeongtaek-si, Gyeonggi-do
- Operator: Korail
- Line: Line 1
- Platforms: 4
- Tracks: 6

Construction
- Structure type: Aboveground

History
- Opened: January 1, 1905

Key dates
- January 20, 2005: Line 1 opened

Passengers
- (Daily) Based on Jan-Dec of 2012. KR: 471; Line 1: 10,067
Location

Seojeong-ri station is a station in Seojeong-dong, Pyeongtaek, South Korea. Mugunghwa-ho trains running on the Gyeongbu Line stop here. Additionally, services on Seoul Subway Line 1 have been calling at this station since 2005. Its station subname is Kookje College (An international college).

== History ==
It is the name of a station on Line 1 of the National Railways located at 427-1 Seojeong-dong, Pyeongtaek-si. There are three good wells called Seodunmul nearby, so it was called Seojeong-ri, and as the National Railway Line 1 was extended to Cheonan, the station got its name.

Seojeong-ri station opened with the Gyeongbu Line in 1905 to service the agricultural area between Pyeongtaek and Osan. It featured Bidulgi (4th class) and limited Tongil (3rd class) services. These were eventually phased out in favor of limited Mugunghwa (then 2nd class) services in the 1990s and 2000s (decade). On January 20, 2005, Seoul Subway Line 1 started local and express services and in 2010 the new Nuriro class of commuter trains began service to Seoul Station, Yongsan, Anyang, Suwon, Osan, Pyeongtaek and Cheonan.

== Information around the station ==
Godeok International New Town is under construction in the southwest. If you look at exit 2 and 3 information, Pyeongtaek/Dangjin Port, Seohaedaegyo Bridge, and Cheongbuk-eup are indicated, but the directions are the same, but they are quite far away. Cheongbuk-eup takes at least 20 minutes by car and is farther than Osan station, It takes at least 40 minutes to get to Pyeongtaek Port. That distance is equivalent to the distance between Suwon station from here. However, as of 2020, Godeokgalpyeong-ro was built and a bus lane was built, so the wasteland can no longer be seen, and you can see the appearance of a new city. In the direction of Exit 1, there is Seojeong-ri 5-day Market (Seojeong-ri Market) and the city area is spread out. If you go further straight ahead, you will see Songtan City Center and National Road No. 1 centered on the Songtan Branch Office (formerly Songtan City Hall).

=== History of change ===
- January 1, 1905: Started business
- December 31, 1932 : Construction of the new station was completed.
- September 10, 1971: Designated as an anthracite cargo arrival station
- January 1, 1994: Stopped handling of small packages
- June 1, 2001: Suspension of ticket sales for specific Tongil trains and computerization of all trains operating on Gyeongbu and Janghang lines
- January 1, 2004: New station completed
- January 20, 2005: Seoul Metropolitan Subway Line 1 opened
- June 1, 2009: Nuriro train service started
- December 30, 2010: Stop handling cargo
- December 30, 2019: Suspension of Nuriro again between Seoul and Sinchang
- January 13, 2020: Restart of Nuriro service (Seoul-Sinchang)
- May 23, 2020: Suspension of Nuriro (Seoul-Sinchang)

== Recent changes ==
Seojeong-ri station has an average daily number of over 10,000 users as the number of users continues to increase due to development projects such as Seojeong-dong and Jungang-dong, as well as development projects such as Godeok International New Town and Godeok Industrial Complex. There was a long-standing inconvenience in using the railroad. Accordingly, the city signed a business agreement with the National Railroad Corporation and Gyeonggi Housing and Urban Corporation to provide a convenient railroad environment for citizens using Seojeong-ri station and to resolve the imbalance of convenience facilities in the original downtown, and install escalators at the main entrance to the original downtown and in the passageway connecting the subway platform. promoted As a result, in November 2021, the escalator was installed in the passageway connecting the upper and lower train platforms and is in operation.

== Vicinity ==
Kookje College is nearby. On June 4, 2009, a Homeplus store opened just a few blocks from the subway station. This area was designated by the city council as a development area. Its neighborhood is also part of a Pyeongtaek construction zone, which also includes Seojeong-dong, Jangdang-dong, Mogok-dong, Ichung-dong, and Jije-dong. Located near the station are many shops and vendors. Official plans for a "new city" have been announced.

== Passengers ==
	Passengers	
	2005	2006
Line 1	3208	3727

Preceding station	Seoul Metropolitan Subway	Following station
Songtan towards Kwangwoon University	Line 1	PyeongtaekJije towards Sinchang
Osan towards Cheongnyangni or Seoul	Line 1 Gyeongbu Express	Pyeongtaek towards Sinchang
Preceding station	Korail	Following station
Osan towards Seoul	ITX-Saemaeul Gyeongbu Line	Pyeongtaek towards Busan
Osan towards Yongsan	ITX-Saemaeul Honam Line	Pyeongtaek towards Mokpo
Suwon towards Seoul	ITX-Maum Gyeongbu Line	Seonghwan towards Busan
Osan towards Seoul	Mugunghwa-ho Gyeongbu Line	Pyeongtaek towards Busan
Suwon towards Yongsan	Mugunghwa-ho Honam Line	Pyeongtaek towards Mokpo
Osan towards Yongsan	Mugunghwa-ho Jeolla Line	Pyeongtaek towards Yeosu-Expo
