= Seonghwan station =

Train station in South Korea

성환 (남서울대)
Seonghwan
(Namseoul Univ.)
성환 (남서울대); Seonghwan (Namseoul Univ.)
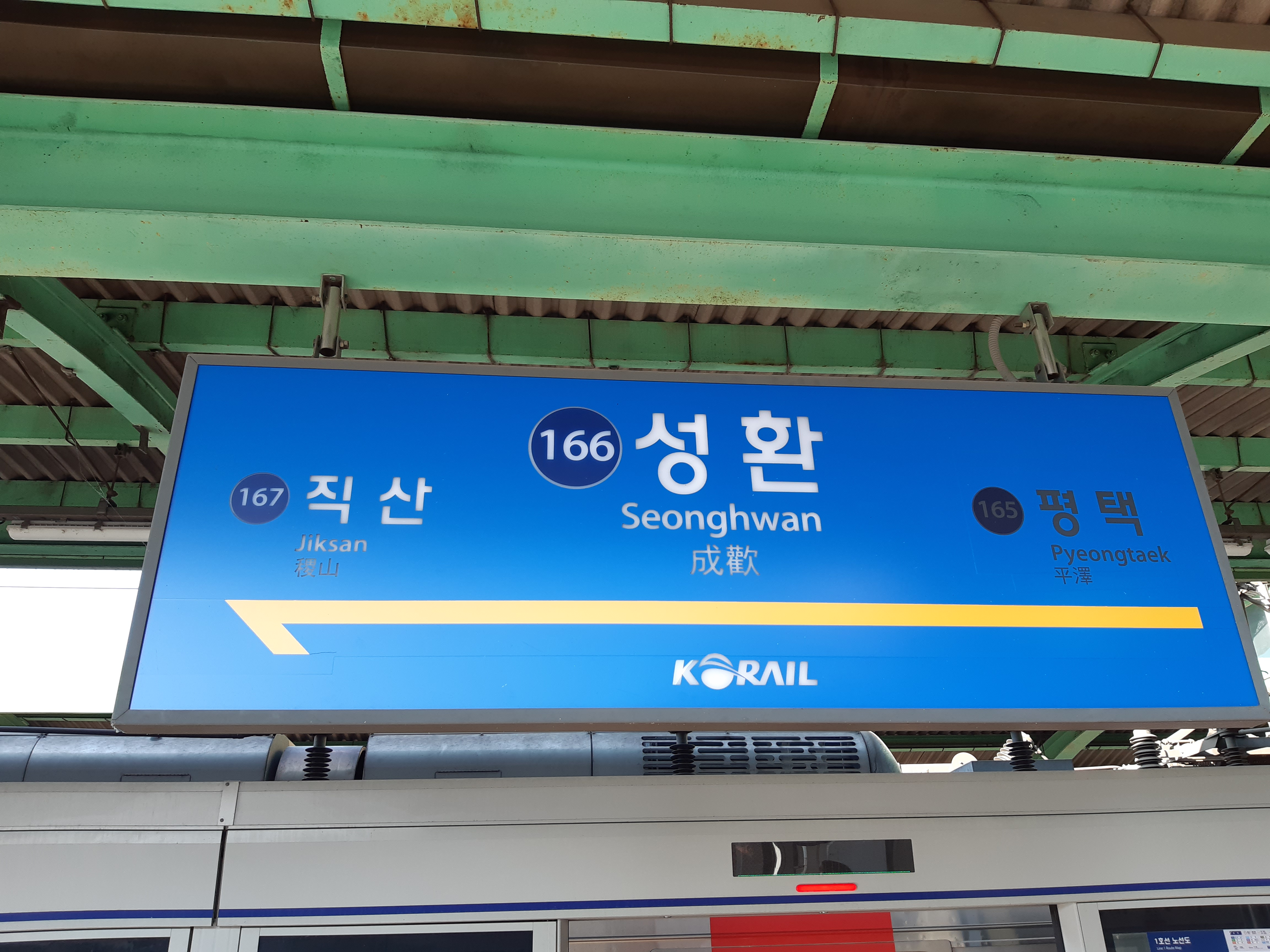
- Station nameplate

Korean name
- Hangul: 성환역
- Hanja: 成歡驛
- RR: Seonghwan-yeok
- MR: Sŏnghwan-yŏk

General information
- Location: 449-128 Seonghwanni, 237-5 Seonghwan 1-ro, Seonghwan-eup, Seobuk-gu, Cheonan-si, Chungcheongnam-do
- Coordinates: 36°54′56″N 127°07′40″E
- Operator: Korail
- Line: Line 1
- Platforms: 4
- Tracks: 6

Construction
- Structure type: Aboveground

History
- Opened: January 1, 1905

Key dates
- January 20, 2005: Line 1 opened

Passengers
- (Daily) Based on Jan-Dec of 2012. KR: 400; Line 1: 9,944
Location

Seonghwan Station is a subway station in the province of Chungcheongnam-do. It is located north of Cheonan on the Gyeongbu Line. It is also served by services on Seoul Subway Line 1.

== History ==
During the First Sino-Japanese War, there was a fierce battle in Seonghwan which Japan emerged victorious, thus making the place significant. When the Gyeongbu Line opened in 1905, the government appoints higher-ranking officials as the stationmaster of Seonghwan Station.

In January 20, 2005, it began operating as a subway station. In June 2006, Namseoul University, which was located nearby, successfully won a bid to have its name placed as the station's secondary name, and it paid a usage fee of 35 million won.

== Gallery ==
=== Platforms ===
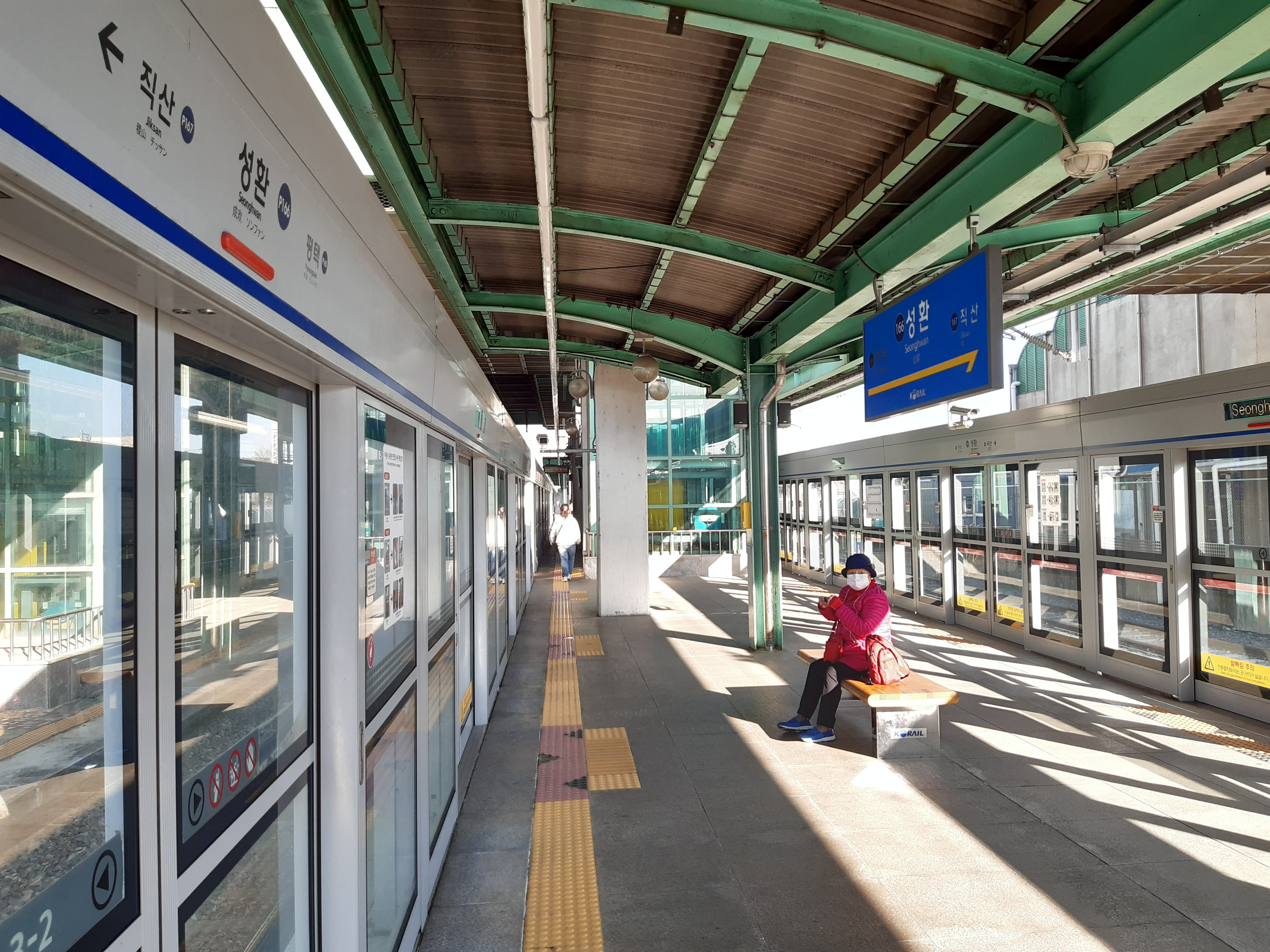

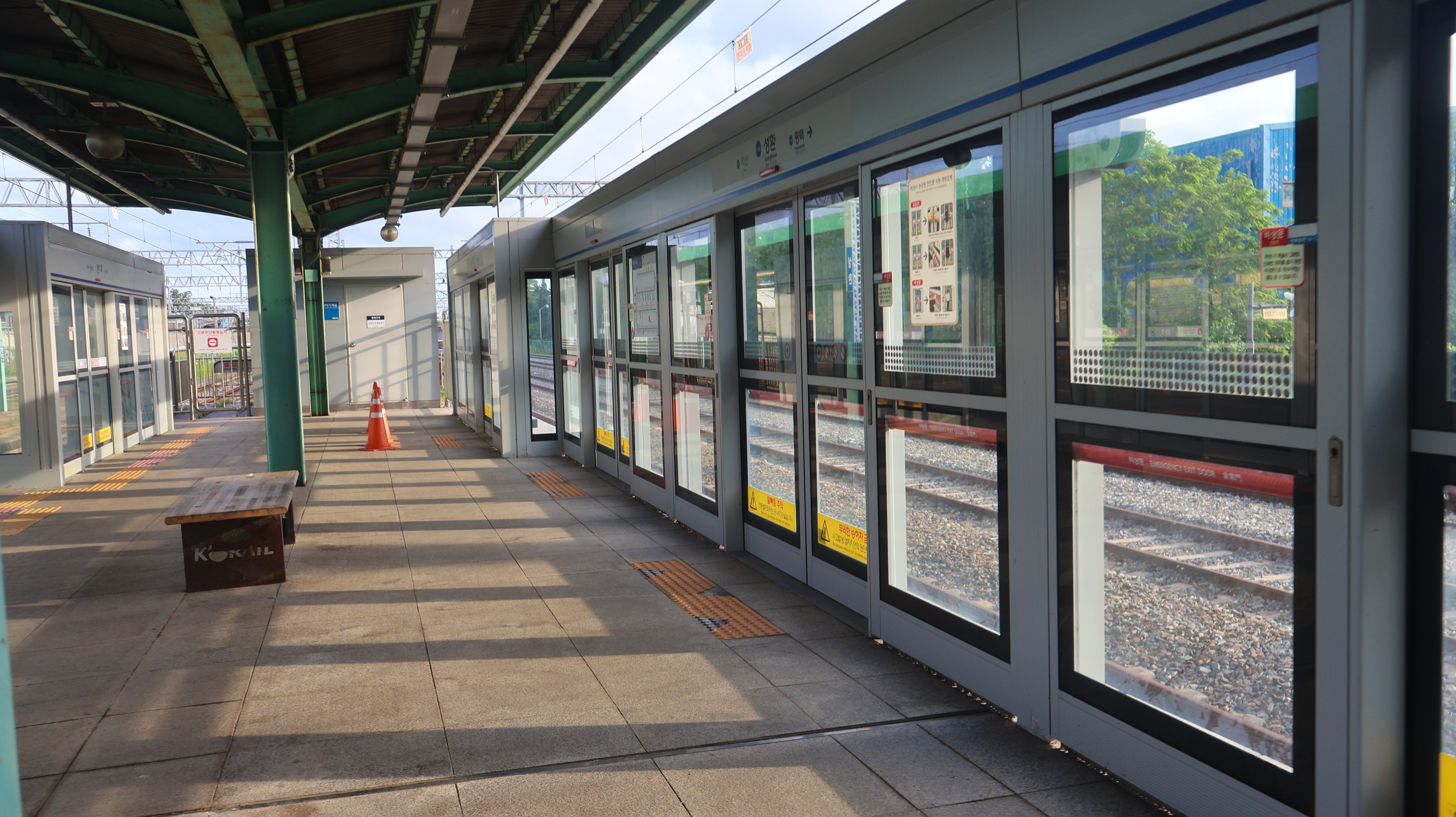

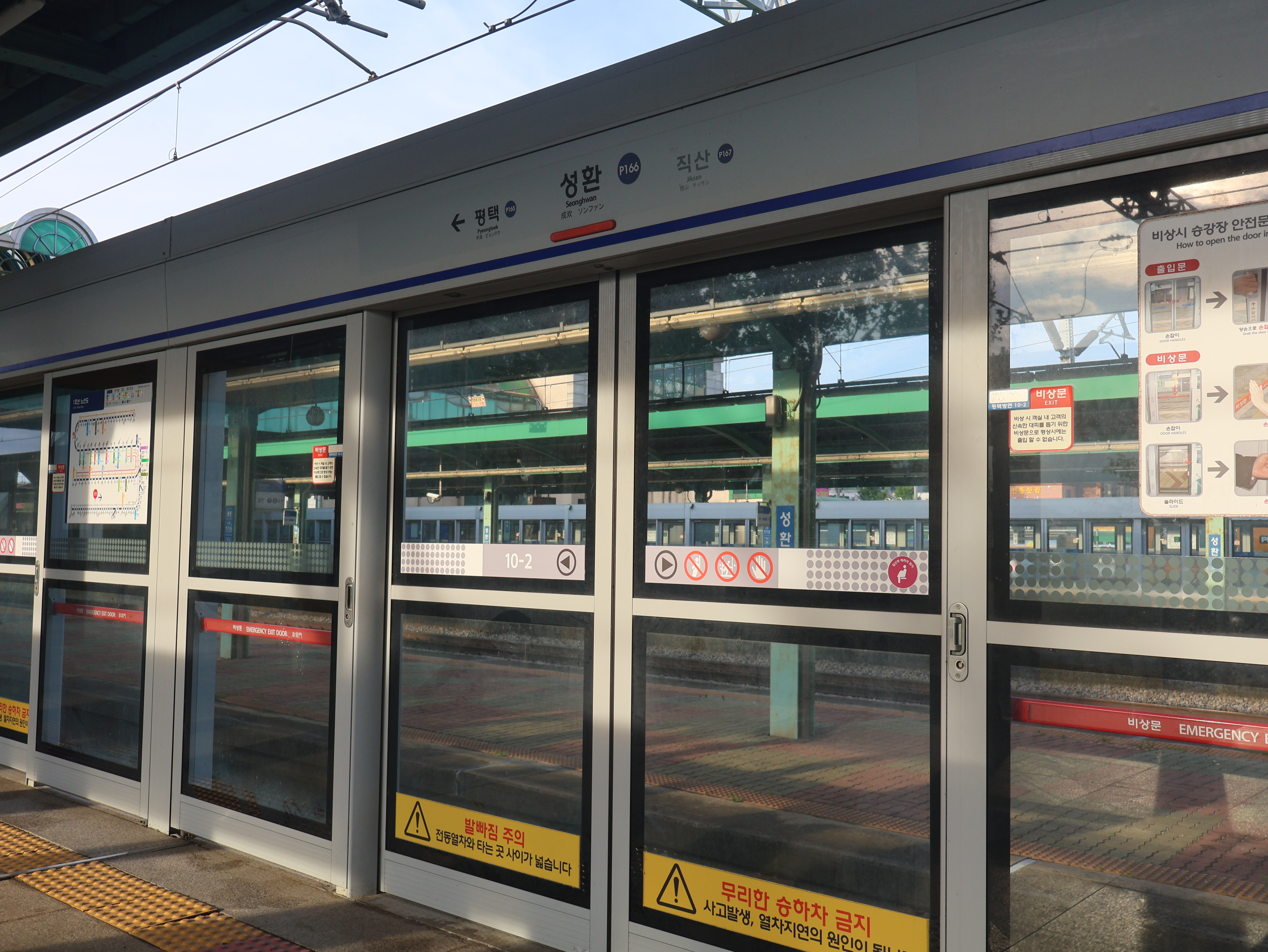

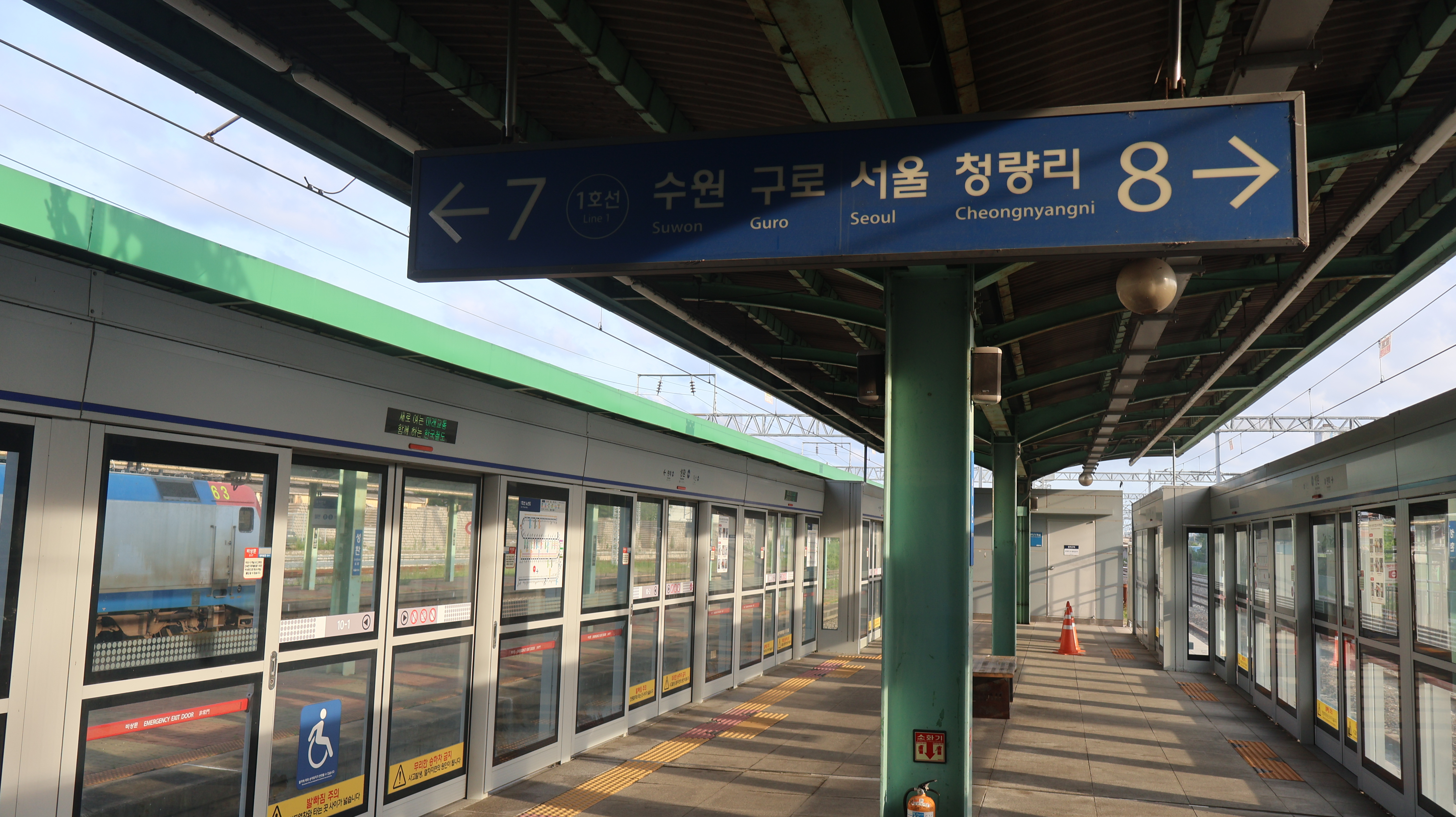

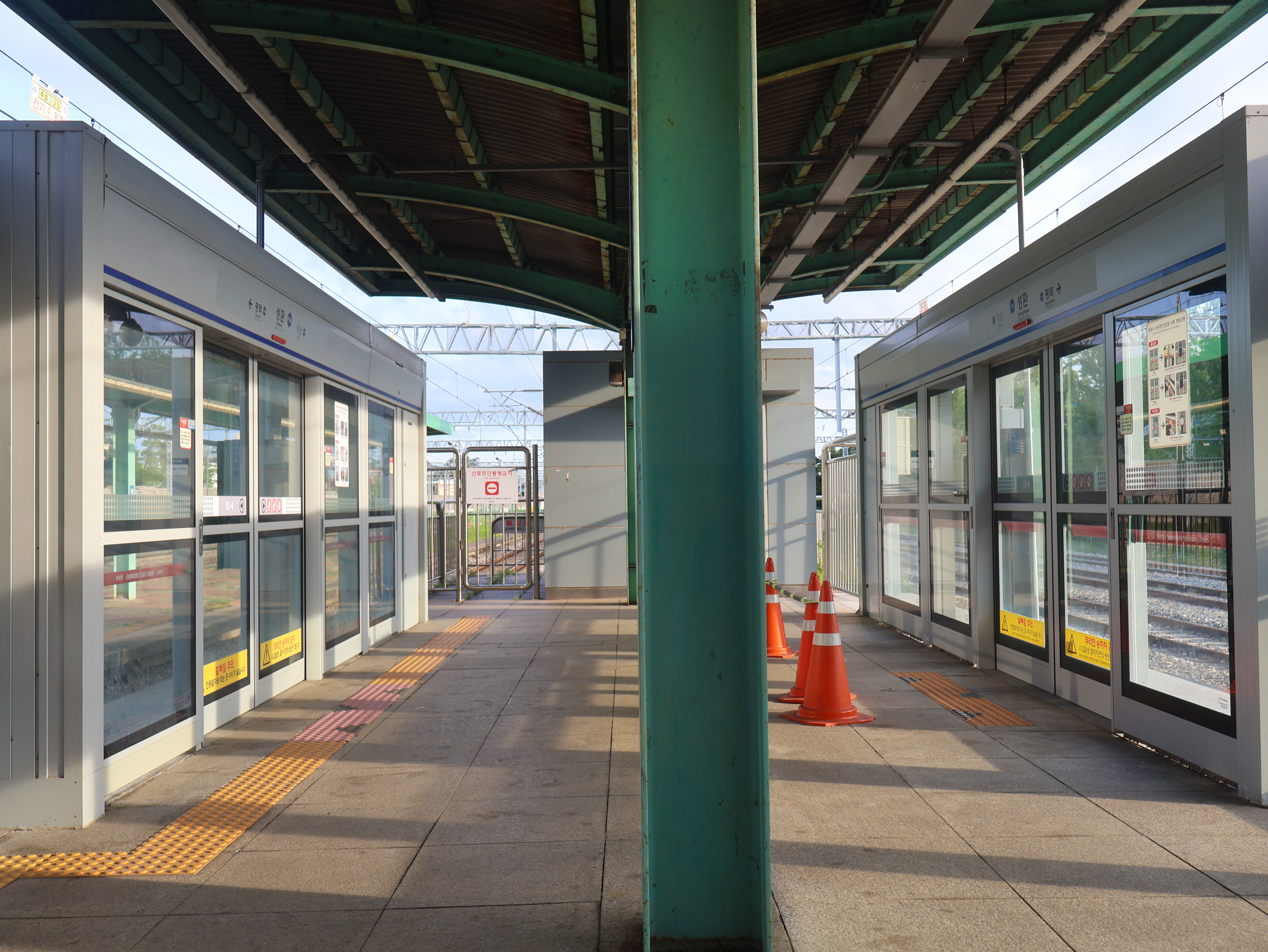

=== Entrance ===
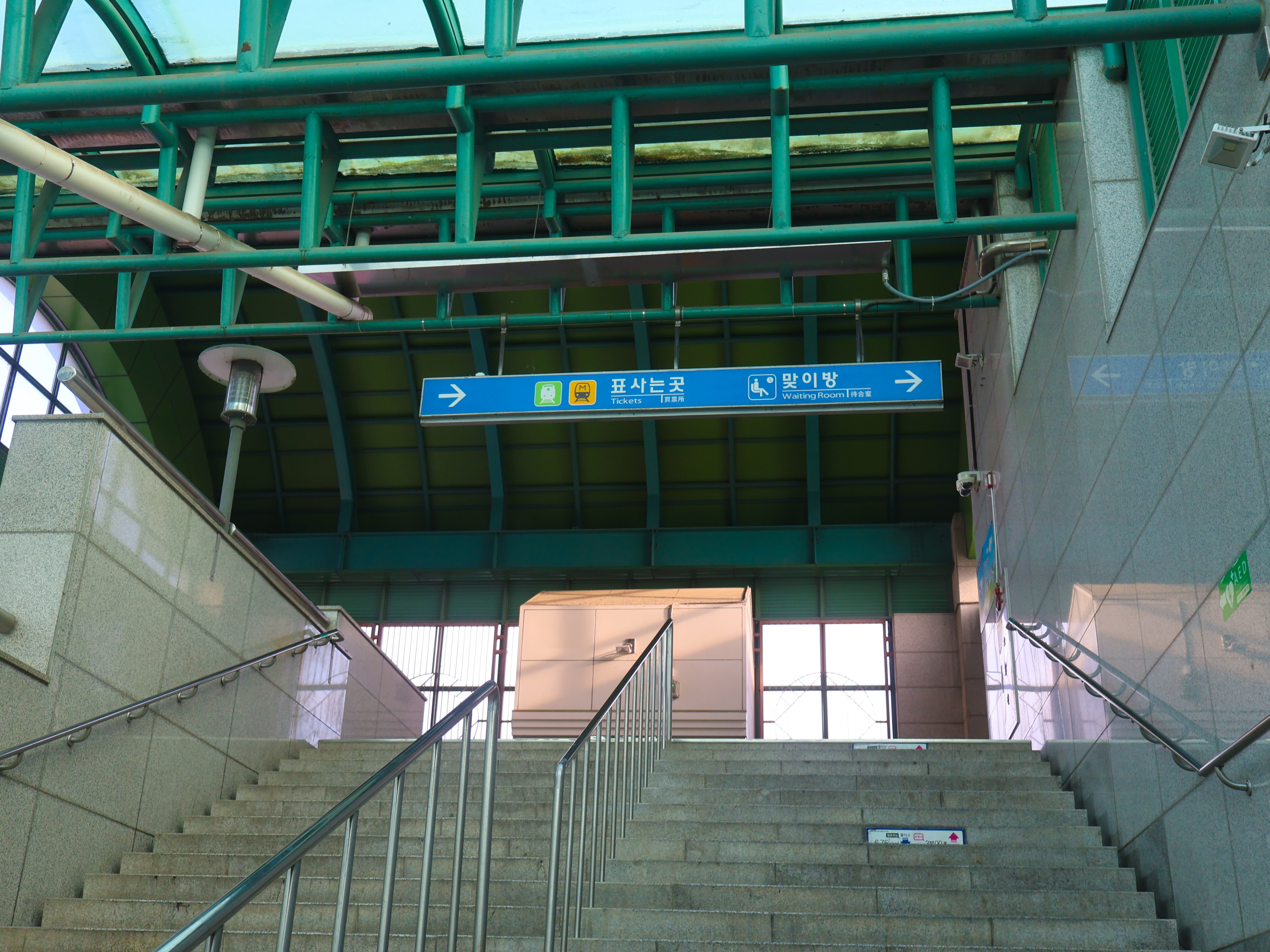

=== Parking ===
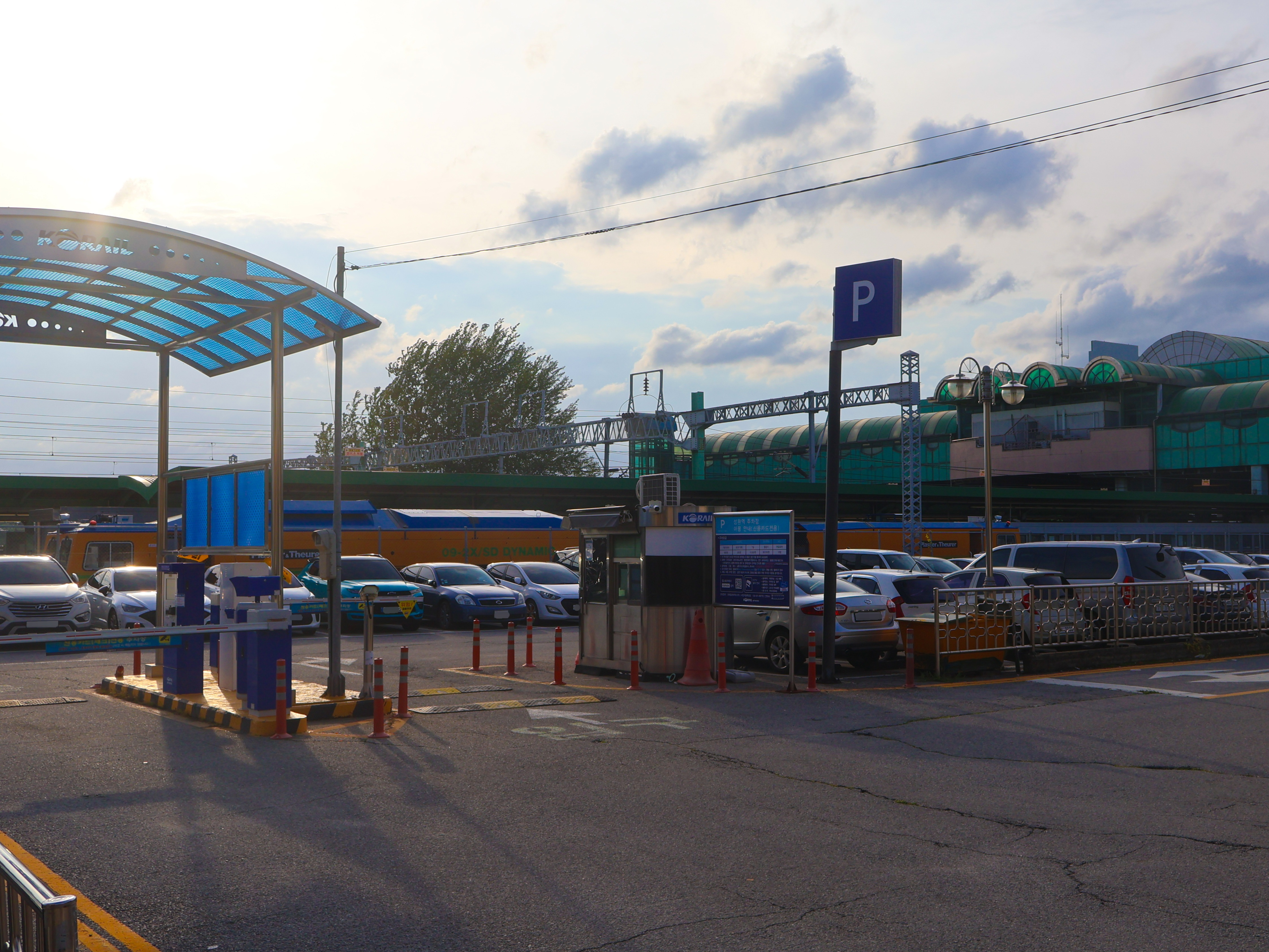

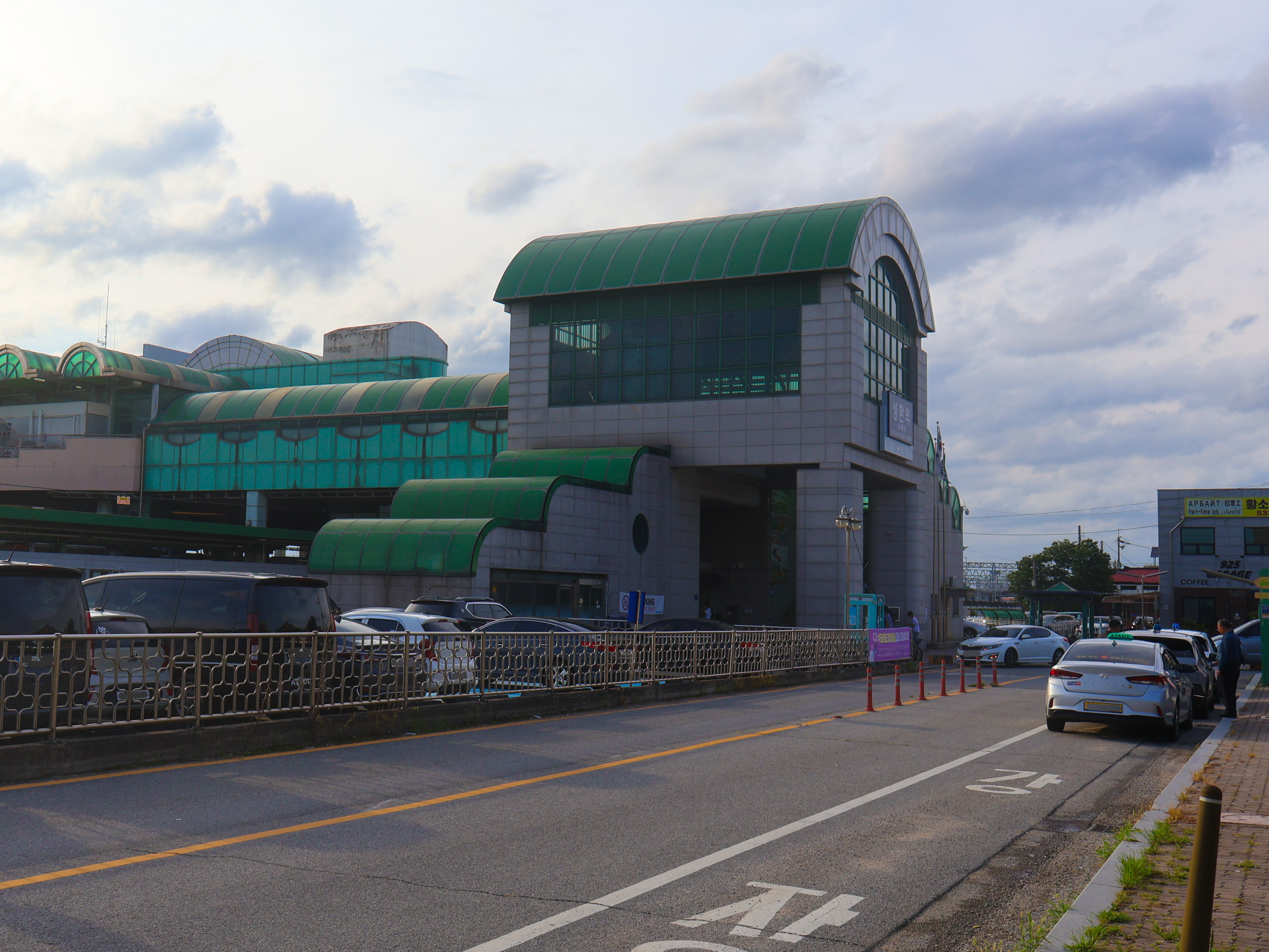

Preceding station	Seoul Metropolitan Subway	Following station
Pyeongtaek towards Kwangwoon University	Line 1	Jiksan towards Sinchang
Pyeongtaek towards Cheongnyangni or Seoul	Line 1 Gyeongbu Express	Dujeong towards Sinchang
Preceding station	Korail	Following station
Pyeongtaek towards Seoul	ITX-Saemaeul Gyeongbu Line	Cheonan towards Busan
Seojeong-ri towards Seoul	ITX-Maum Gyeongbu Line	Cheonan towards Busan
Pyeongtaek towards Seoul	Mugunghwa-ho Gyeongbu Line	Cheonan towards Busan
Pyeongtaek towards Yongsan	Mugunghwa-ho Honam Line	Cheonan towards Gwangju
Pyeongtaek towards Yongsan	Mugunghwa-ho Jeolla Line	Cheonan towards Yeosu-Expo
