= Jiksan station =

Train station in South Korea

직산; Jiksan
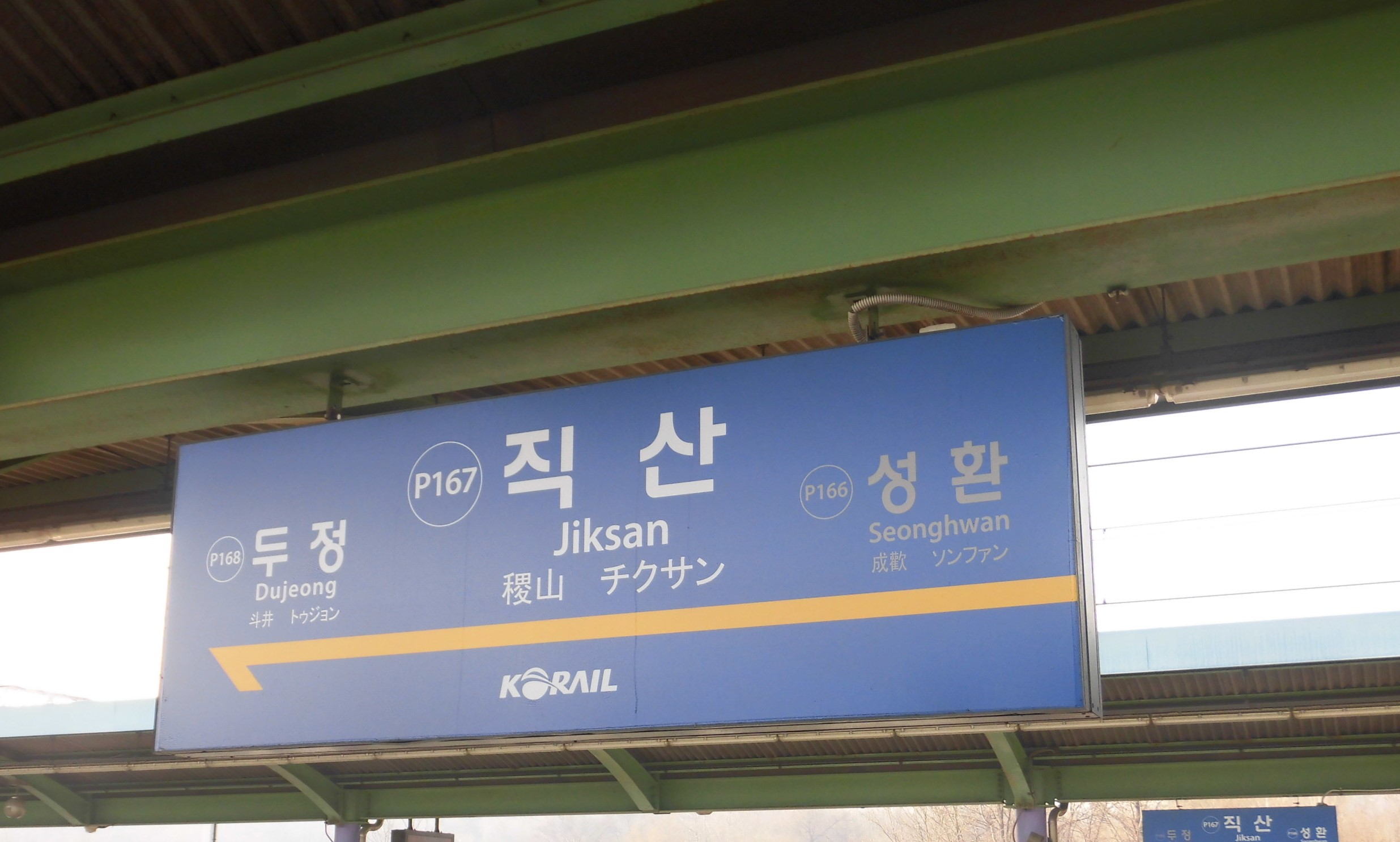

Korean name
- Hangul: 직산역
- Hanja: 稷山驛
- RR: Jiksan-yeok
- MR: Chiksan-yŏk

General information
- Location: 58-11 Mosiri, Cheonandaero 1471-33, Jiksan-eup, Seobuk-gu, Cheonan-si, Chungcheongnam-do
- Coordinates: 36°52′15″N 127°08′38″E
- Operator: Korail
- Line: Line 1
- Platforms: 2
- Tracks: 4

Construction
- Structure type: Aboveground

History
- Opened: December 1, 1935

Key dates
- January 20, 2005: Line 1 opened

Passengers
- (Daily) Based on Jan-Dec of 2012. Line 1: 2,290
Location

Jiksan Station is a station on the Gyeongbu Line in the city of Cheonan in South Chungcheong Province, South Korea. It is served by trains on Seoul Subway Line 1.

Preceding station	Seoul Metropolitan Subway	Following station
Seonghwan towards Kwangwoon University	Line 1	Dujeong towards Sinchang
