= Pyeongtaek station =

Train station in Pyeongtaek, South Korea

Coordinates: 36°59′27″N 127°5′7″E

평택
Pyeongtaek
평택; Pyeongtaek
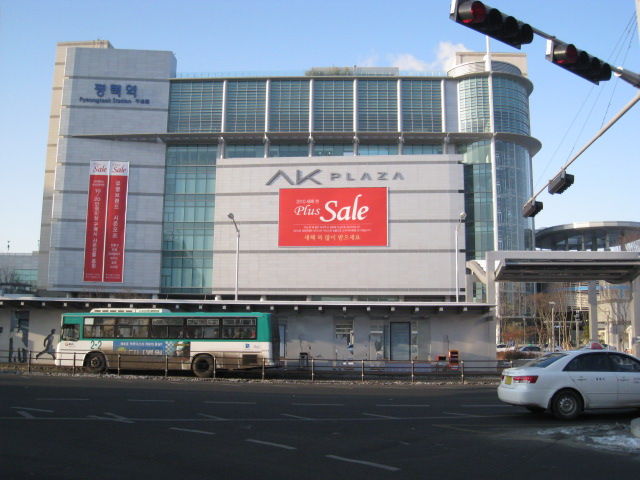

Korean name
- Hangul: 평택역
- Hanja: 平澤驛
- RR: Pyeongtaek-yeok
- MR: P'yŏngt'aek-yŏk

General information
- Location: 185-1 Pyeongtaek-dong, 51 Pyeongtaengno, Pyeongtaek-si, Gyeonggi-do
- Operator: Korail
- Lines: Gyeongbu Line, Pyeongtaek Line
- Platforms: 4
- Tracks: 6

Construction
- Structure type: Aboveground

History
- Opened: January 1, 1905

Key dates
- 20 January 2005: Line 1 opened

Passengers
- (Daily) Based on Jan-Dec of 2012. KR: 12,360; Line 1: 27,187
Location

Pyeongtaek station is the main train station serving the city of Pyeongtaek, South Korea. It is on the Gyeongbu Line and Pyeongtaek Line and is also served by Seoul Subway Line 1. It is not a KTX station, therefore no KTX services stop at this station. There is a ticket counter for Korail where you can buy KTX tickets leaving from KTX stations in Cheonan–Asan to the south and Suwon to the north. Pyeongtaek station is attached to AK Plaza, a department store brand with additional locations in other areas of South Korea. The Pyeongtaek station / AK Plaza building also offers restaurants, grocery shopping and a movie theater. The cinema is located on the 8th floor of AK Plaza and is a CJ CGV multi-screen facility with a 4-D screen. The station is also located in Pyeongtaek-dong, Pyeongtaek-si so you can find many stores and restaurants outside Exit 1.

== History ==
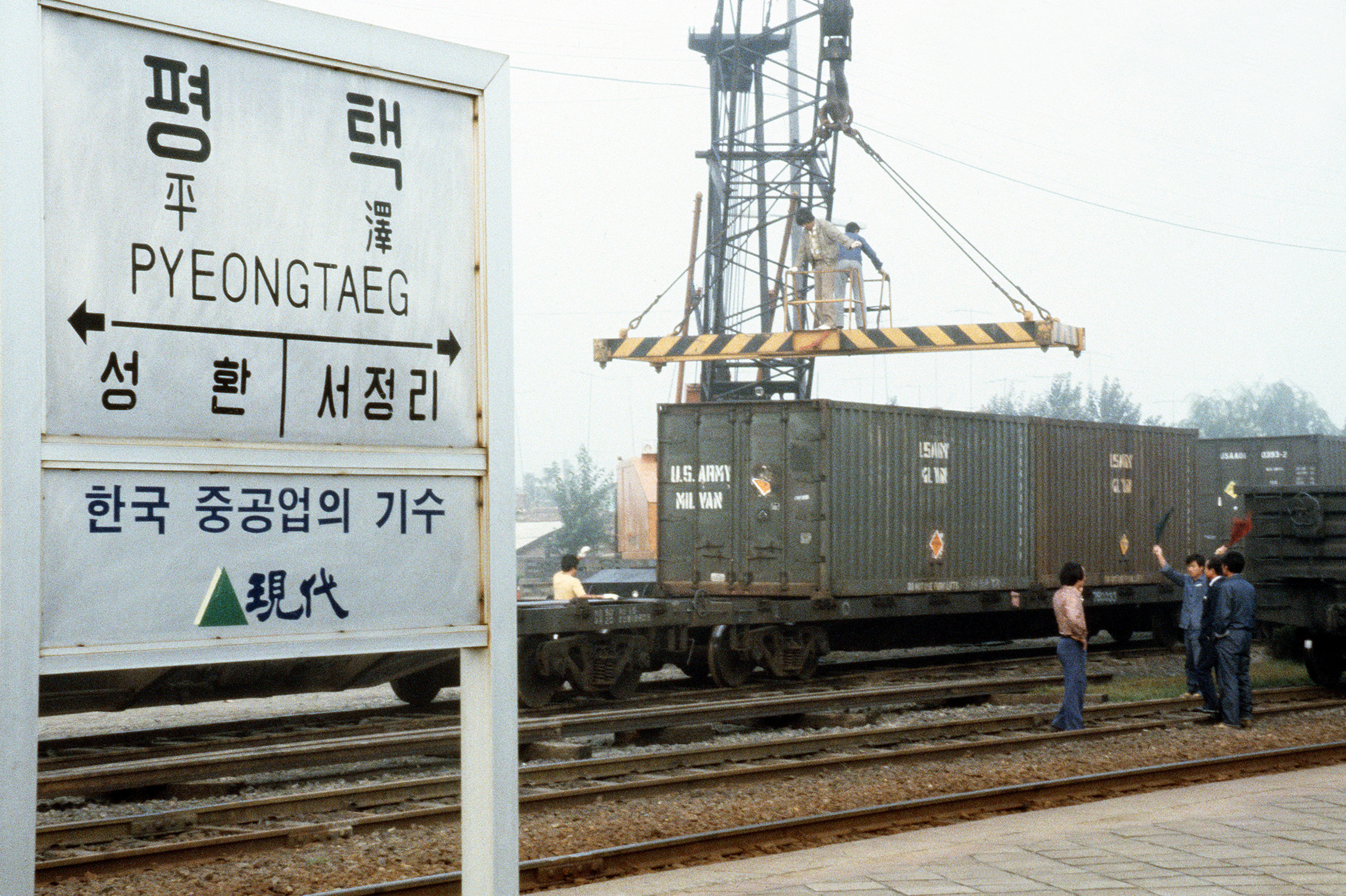
Old station nameplate (August 31, 1981)

- January 1, 1905: Began operations as a regular station in Byeongnam-myeon, Jinwi-gun (now Tongbok-ri, present-day Wonpyeong-dong)
- 1950: Station building was destroyed
- October 5, 1953: New station building completed in Pyeongtaek-dong
- September 10, 1971: Designated as a receiving station for anthracite coal for civilian use
- April 1, 1985: Ceased passenger and small freight operations at Anseong Station
- April 8, 1985: Demoted Anseong Station to a local station
- January 4, 1988: Ceased operations at Anseong Station and completed the new Pyeongtaek Station building
- June 2, 1999: With the revision of train schedules, all Mugunghwa-ho trains on the Gyeongbu Line began stopping
- June 1, 2001: Discontinued the issuance of Edmondson tickets for the Chungang Line's Tteukbyeol Tongil-ho, and began computerization of the line
- April 1, 2004: Saemaeul-ho trains began stopping
- January 20, 2005: Extension of the Seoul Metropolitan Subway Line 1 opened, and operations began
- May 1, 2006: Ceased handling of small freight
- December 15, 2008: Double-track electrification of the Janghang Line (Cheonan-Shinchang) opened, with Nuriho trains beginning service on June 1, 2009 (Seoul-Shinchang)
- April 24, 2009: Though initially lacking feasibility, local residents of Anseong and Osan advocated for the construction of a private station, leading to the establishment and completion of the station
- May 12, 2014: ITX-Saemaeul service began
- March 2, 2015: Pyeongtaek Line and direct Pyeongtaek Line service began (notification by Ministry of Land, Infrastructure, and Transport, 2015-87)
- May 1, 2017: ITX-Cheongchun (Yongsan-Cheonan) express and (Suwon-Cheonan-Shinchang) local services began
- December 18, 2017: Ceased freight handling (notification by Ministry of Land, Infrastructure, and Transport, 2017-839)
- April 1, 2018: Discontinued ITX-Cheongchun service on the Gyeongbu Line
- January 1, 2020: Resumed Nuriho service (Seoul-Shinchang), then ceased it again on June 1, 2020
- January 20, 2020: Nuriho service resumed (Seoul-Shinchang)
- March 2, 2020: Nuriho service on the Honam Line and Chungbuk Line ceased
- June 1, 2020: Nuriho service ceased (Seoul-Shinchang)
- September 1, 2023: ITX-Maeum service began
- November 2, 2024: Pyeongtaek Line (Circular) opened

== Station structure ==
It has a 4-platform, 6-track layout. There are 2 exits. The station serves as a stop for the Saemaeul-ho, Mugunghwa-ho, ITX-Saemaeul, and ITX-Maeum trains. KTX trains and tourist trains also pass through the station, connecting via Suwon Station. However, for the Seoul Metropolitan Subway Line 1, crossing to the opposite platform is not possible because of the station's structure. All subway platforms are equipped with screen doors. Trains on the Pyeongtaek Line are treated as part of platforms 3 and 6, which serve as the main line and secondary line for general trains on the Seoul Metropolitan Subway Line 1. The general train main line is not connected to the Pyeongtaek Line.

== Images ==
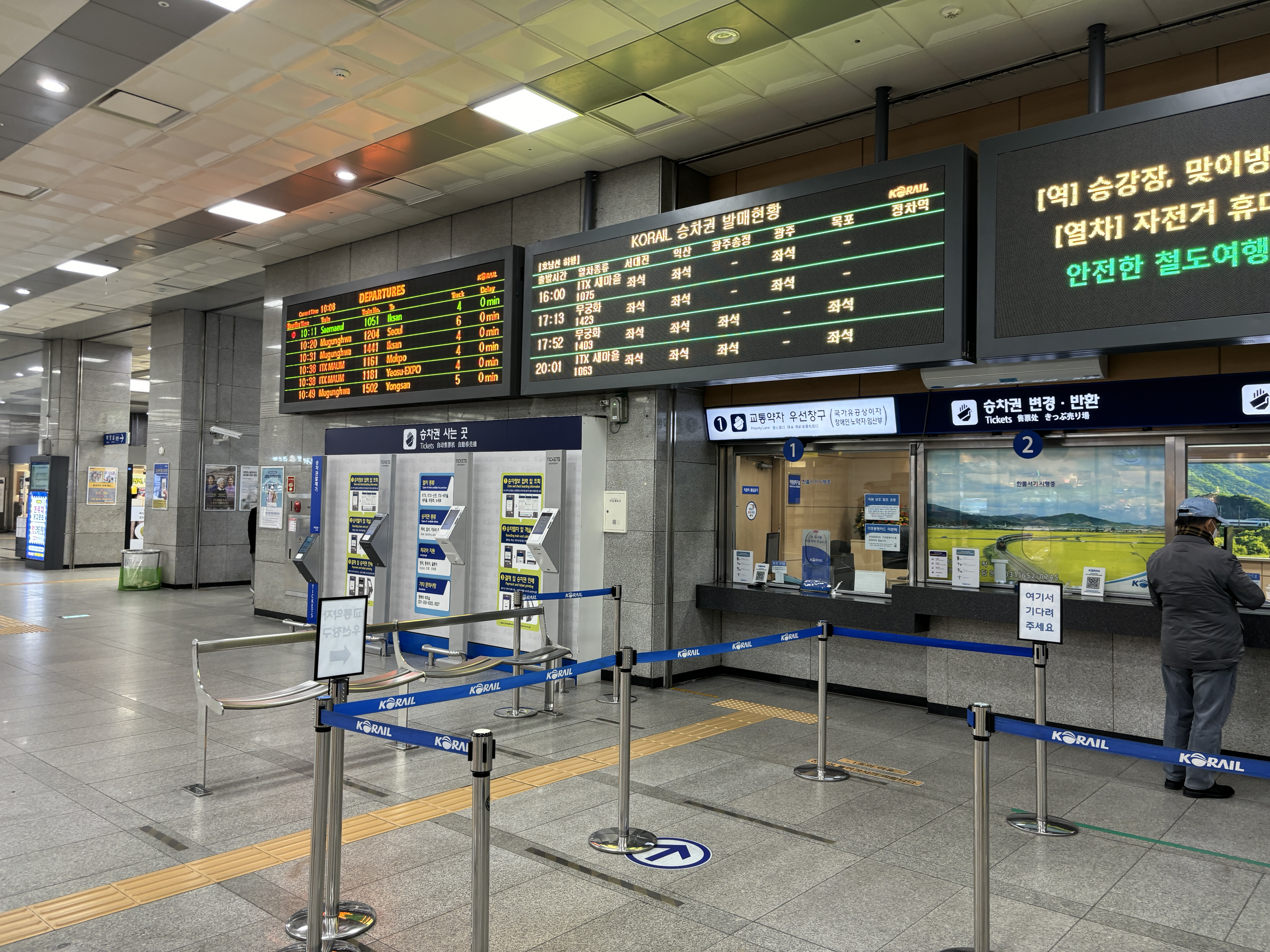
Ticket counter for long-distance trains

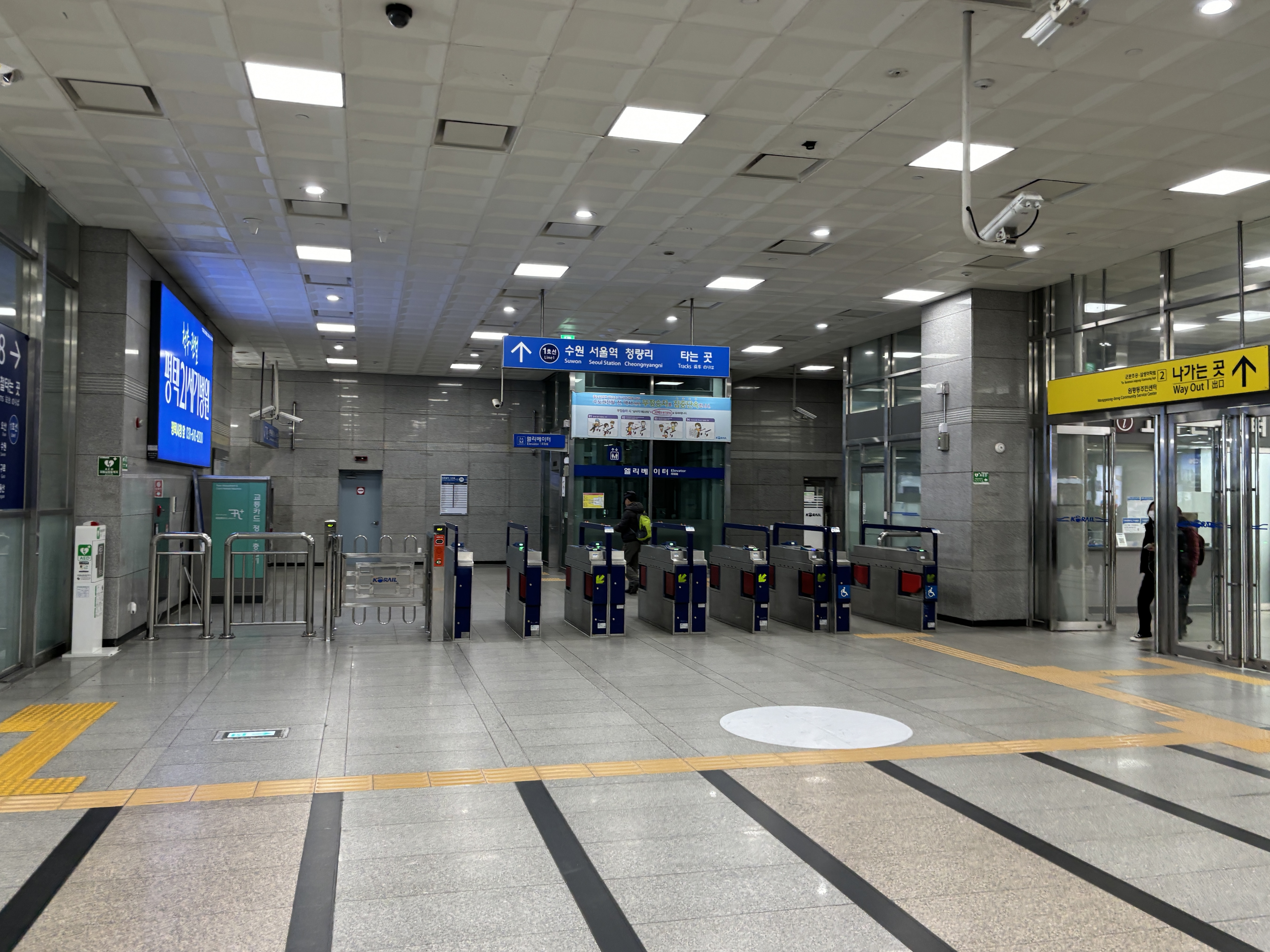
Metro concourse

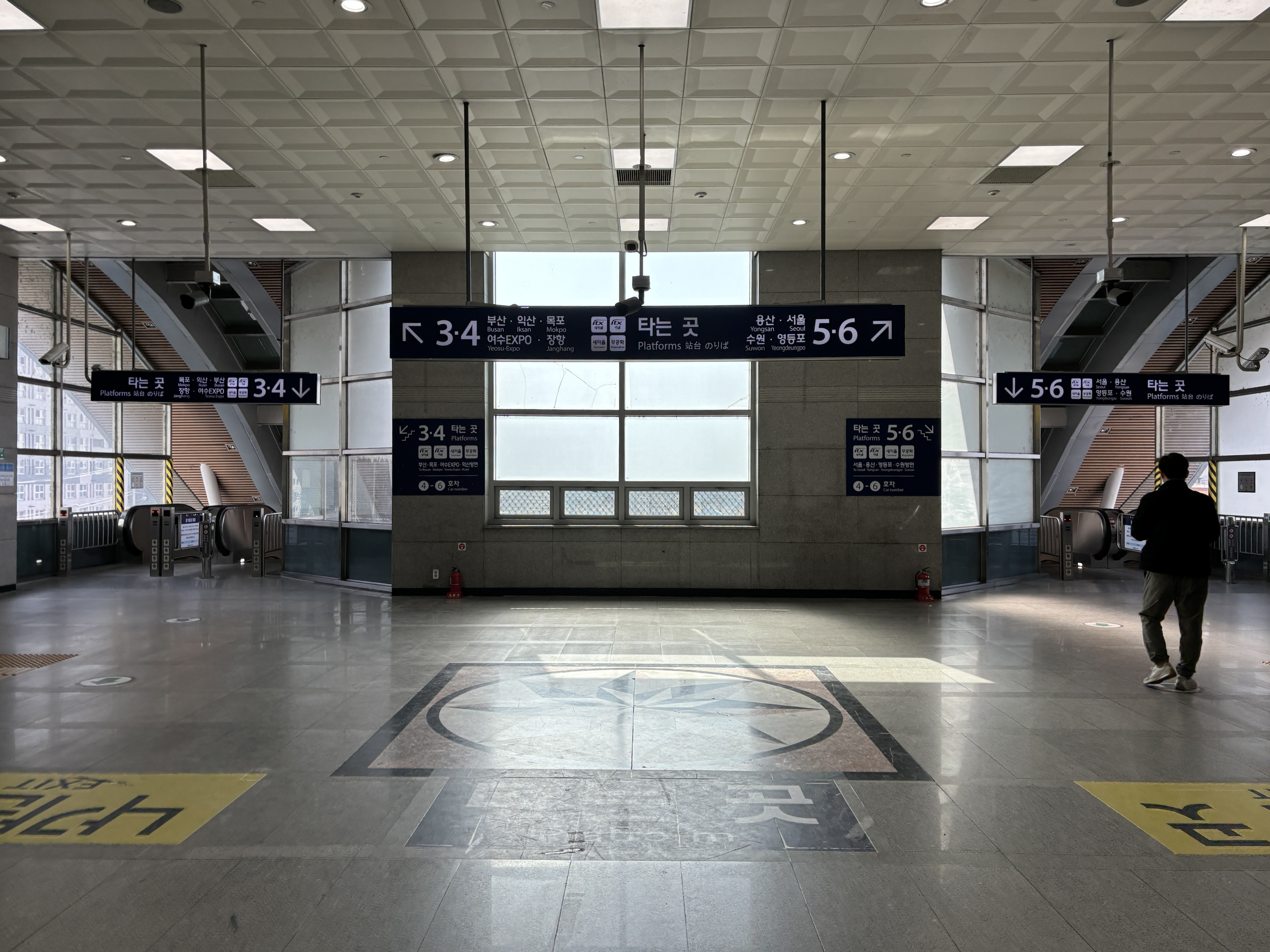
Entrance to long-distance trains

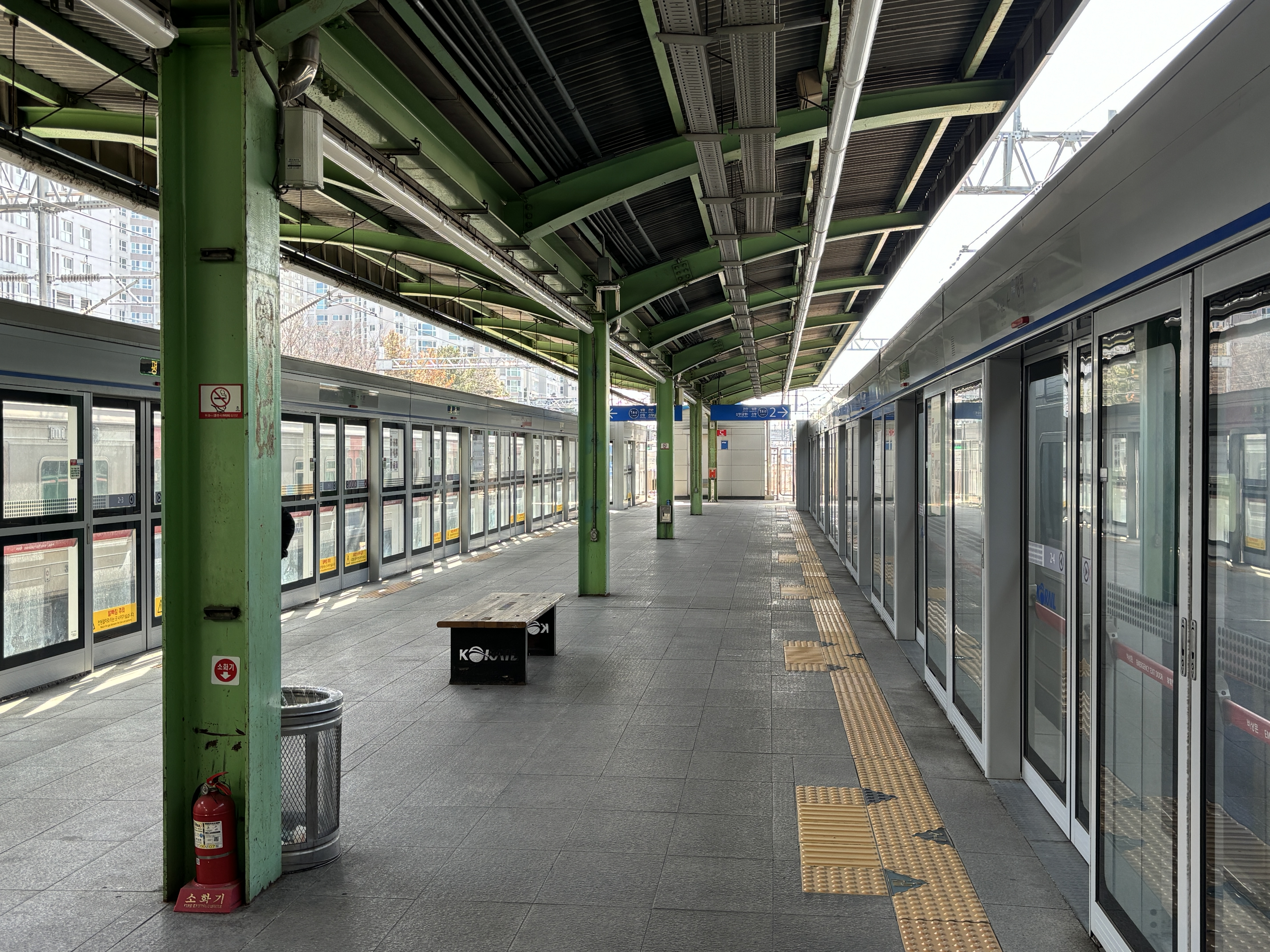
Platform 1, 2 of metro trains

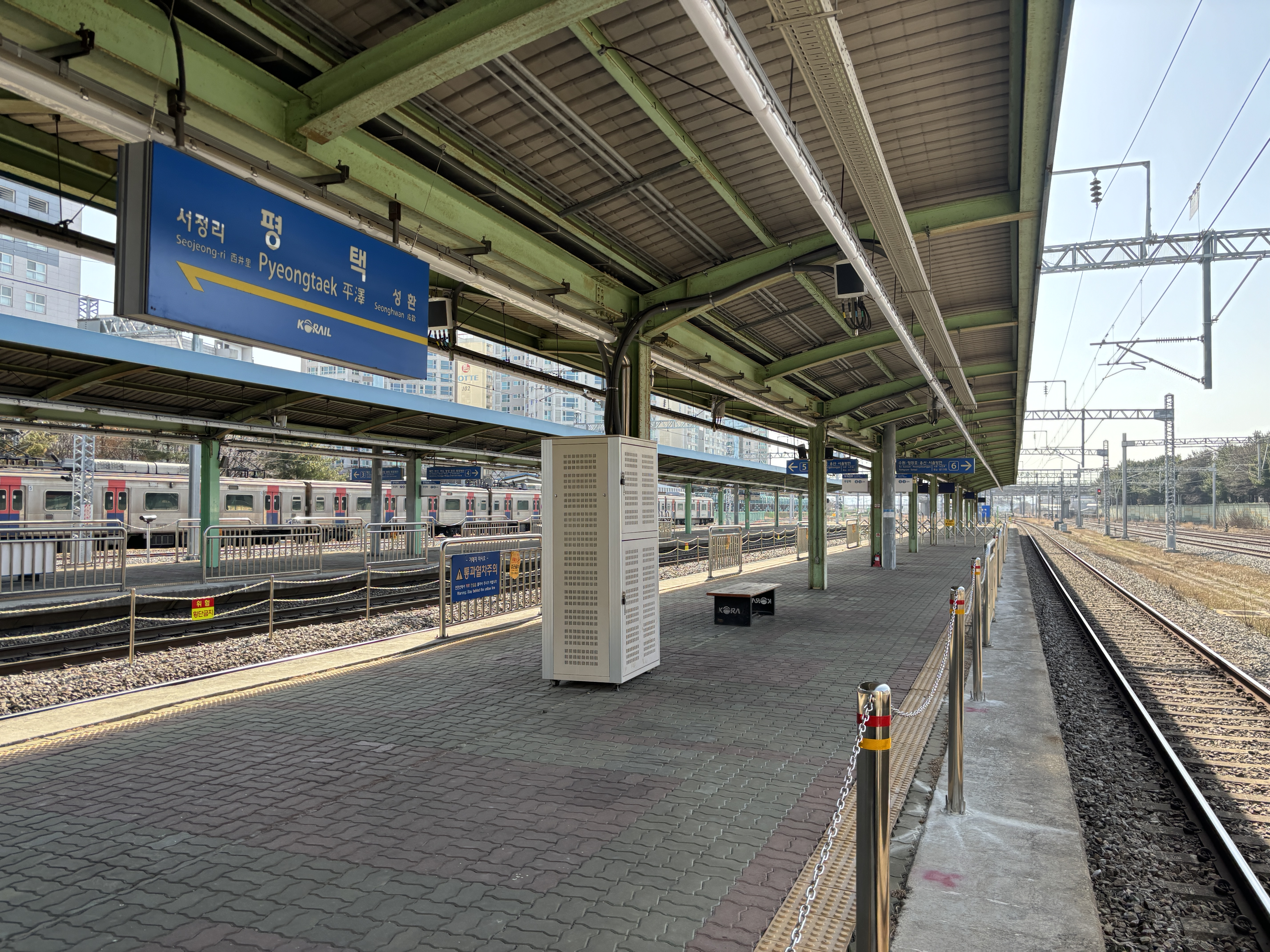
Platform 5, 6 of long-distance trains

Preceding station	Seoul Metropolitan Subway	Following station
PyeongtaekJije towards Kwangwoon University	Line 1	Seonghwan towards Sinchang
Seojeong-ri towards Cheongnyangni or Seoul	Line 1 Gyeongbu Express	Seonghwan towards Sinchang
Preceding station	Korail	Following station
Seojeong-ri towards Seoul	ITX-Saemaeul Gyeongbu Line	Cheonan towards Busan
Suwon towards Seoul	ITX-Saemaeul Gyeongbu Line via Seonghwan	Seonghwan towards Busan
Suwon towards Seoul	ITX-Saemaeul Gyeongjeon Line	Cheonan towards Jinju
Seojeong-ri towards Yongsan	ITX-Saemaeul Honam Line	Cheonan towards Mokpo
Suwon towards Yongsan	ITX-Saemaeul Gwangju Line	Cheonan towards Gwangju
Suwon towards Yongsan	ITX-Saemaeul Jeolla Line	Cheonan towards Yeosu-Expo
Suwon towards Seoul	ITX-Maum Gyeongbu Line	Cheonan towards Busan
Suwon towards Yongsan	ITX-Maum Honam Line	Cheonan towards Mokpo
Suwon towards Yongsan	ITX-Maum Jeolla Line	Cheonan towards Yeosu-Expo
Suwon towards Yongsan	ITX-Maum Janghang Line	Cheonan towards Hongseong
Anjung Next counterclockwise	ITX-Maum Pyeongtaek Line	Cheonan Next clockwise
Suwon towards Yongsan	Saemaeul-ho Janghang Line	Cheonan towards Iksan
Seojeong-ri towards Seoul	Mugunghwa-ho Gyeongbu Line	Seonghwan towards Busan
Seojeong-ri towards Yongsan	Mugunghwa-ho Honam Line	Cheonan towards Mokpo
Osan towards Yongsan	Mugunghwa-ho Honam Line	Seonghwan towards Gwangju
Osan towards Seoul	Mugunghwa-ho Chungbuk Line	Cheonan towards Jecheon
Suwon towards Yongsan	Mugunghwa-ho Janghang Line	Cheonan towards Iksan
Seojeong-ri towards Yongsan	Mugunghwa-ho Jeolla Line	Seonghwan towards Yeosu-Expo
Suwon towards Seoul	Chungbuk Yeongdong Gugak Wine Train	Cheonan towards Yeongdong
