= Dujeong station =

Railway station located in northern Cheonan

두정; Dujeong
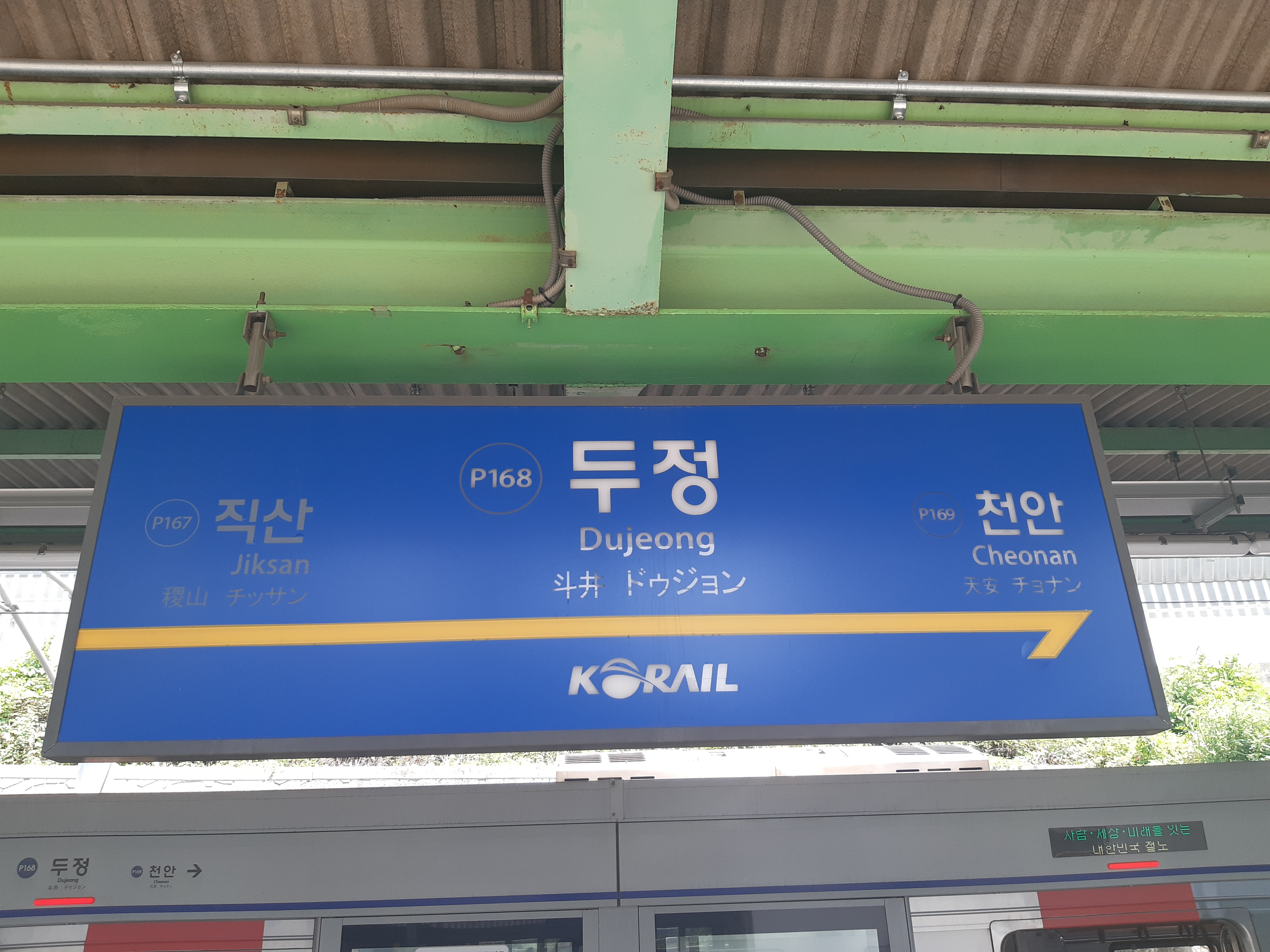
- Station nameplate

Korean name
- Hangul: 두정역
- Hanja: 斗井驛
- RR: Dujeong-yeok
- MR: Tujŏng-yŏk

General information
- Location: 84-1 Dujeong-dong, 289 Dujeongno, Seobuk-gu, Cheonan-si, South Chungcheong Province
- Coordinates: 36°50′02″N 127°08′57″E
- Operator: Korail
- Line: Line 1
- Platforms: 2
- Tracks: 4

Construction
- Structure type: Aboveground

History
- Opened: June 15, 1979

Key dates
- January 20, 2005: Line 1 opened

Passengers
- (Daily) Based on Jan-Dec of 2012. Line 1: 14,054
Location

Dujeong Station is a railway station located in northern Cheonan. The station opened on the Gyeongbu Line – the line from Seoul to Busan – on June 15, 1979, and was put under the control of Cheonan Station on July 1, 1985. It has also been served by Seoul Subway Line 1 since January 20, 2005. The station is close to Gongju University, the Cheonan campuses of Sangmyung University, Dankook University, Hoseo University and Baekseok University. It is also in proximity of Cheonan Bus Terminal, Cheonan Industrial Complex, Cheonan Sindae Elementary School, Bugil Academy and Bugil Girls' High School. Technically, the station is also on the Cheonan Connection Line, though this has only two stops: Cheonan and Dujeong. A large movie theater (CINUS) with restaurants and snack shops is located in close proximity to the station.

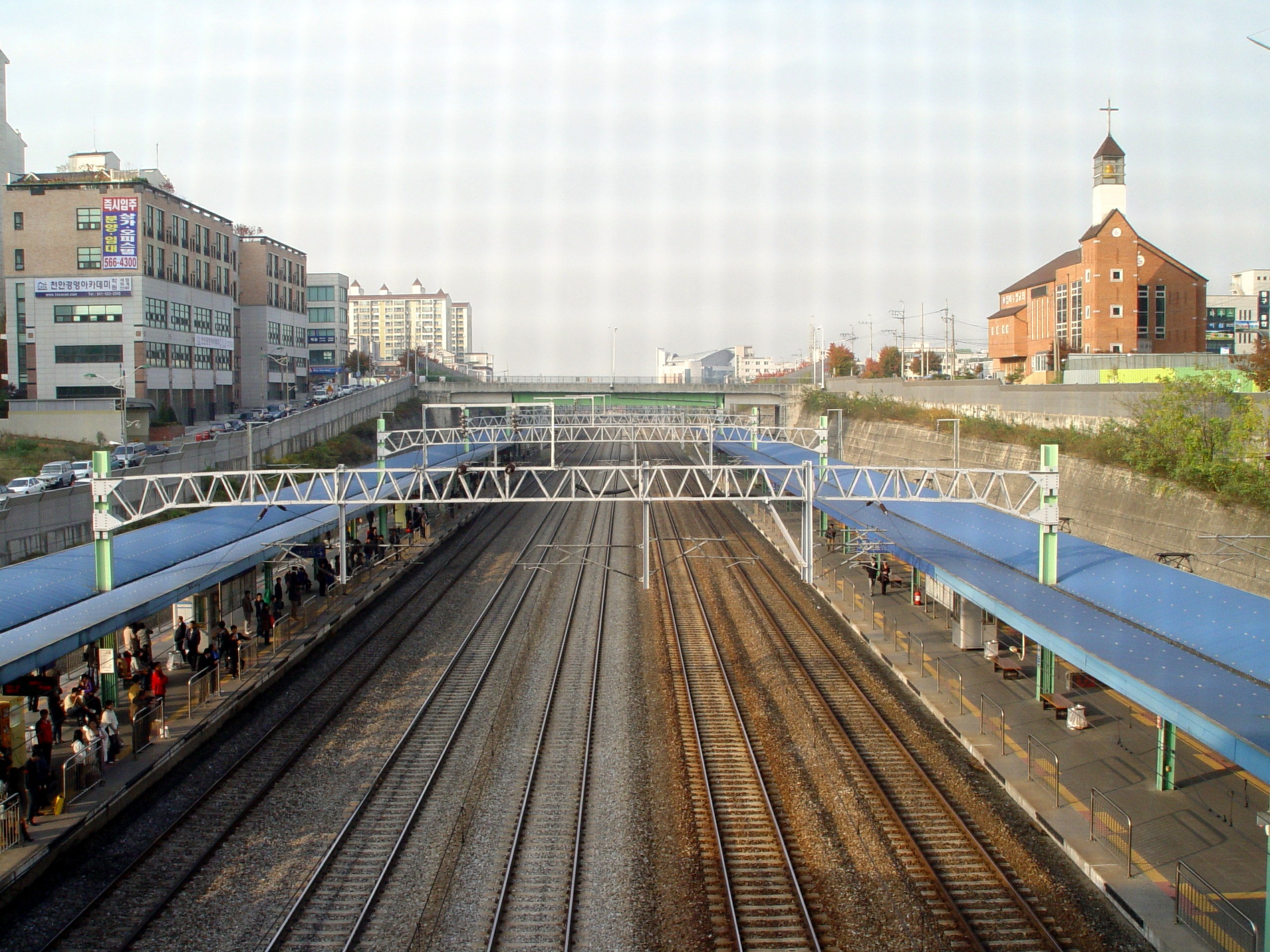
Platforms and tracks

Preceding station	Seoul Metropolitan Subway	Following station
Jiksan towards Kwangwoon University	Line 1	Cheonan towards Sinchang
Seonghwan towards Cheongnyangni	Line 1 Gyeongbu Express	Cheonan towards Sinchang
