= Osan station =

Metro station in Osan, South Korea

오산
Osan
오산; Osan
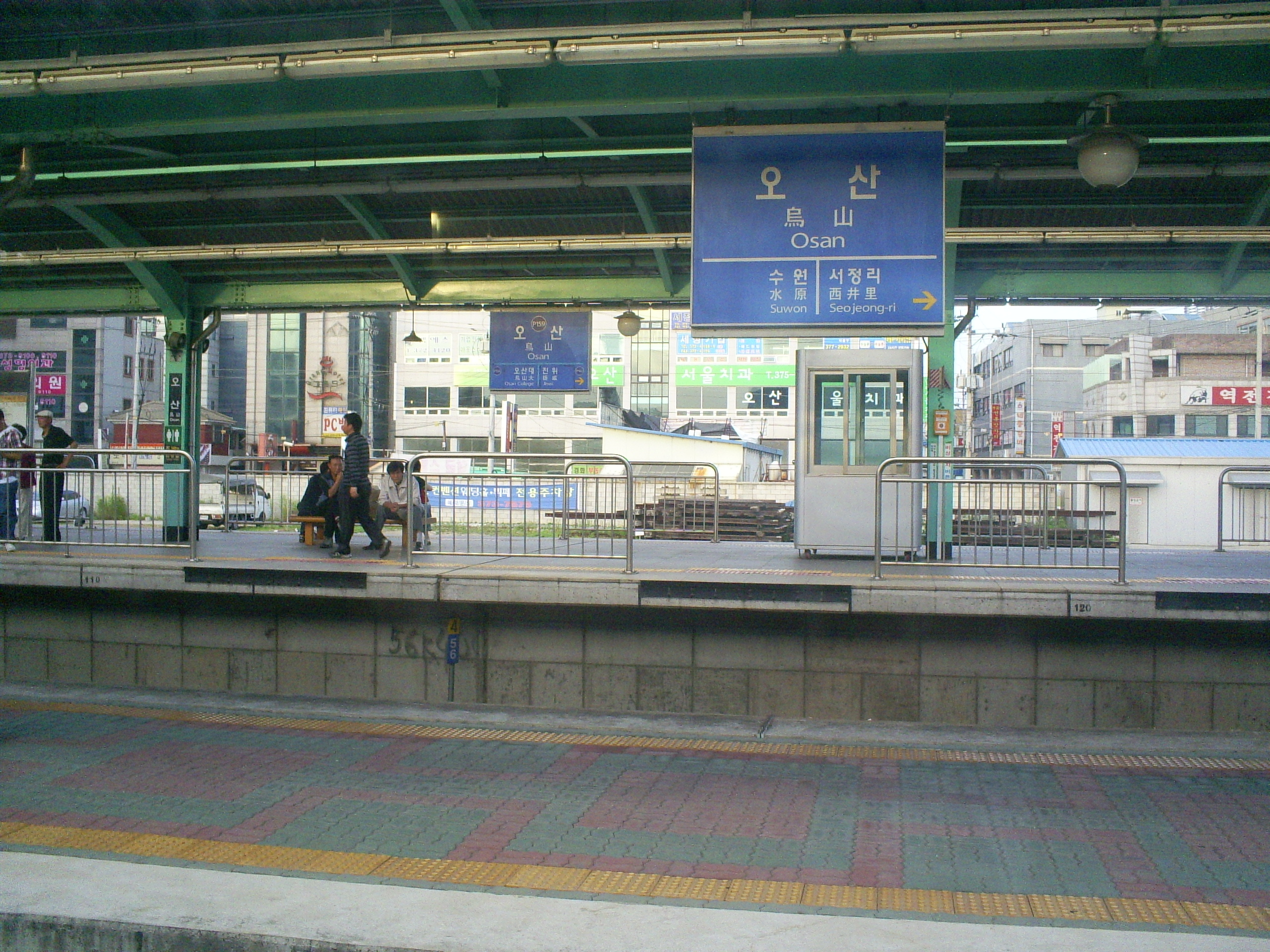

Korean name
- Hangul: 오산역
- Hanja: 烏山驛
- RR: Osan-yeok
- MR: Osan-yŏk

General information
- Location: 603-1 Osan-dong, 59 Yeokgwangjangno, Osan-si, Gyeonggi-do
- Coordinates: 37°08′44″N 127°04′02″E
- Operator: Korail
- Line: Line 1
- Platforms: 4
- Tracks: 6

Construction
- Structure type: Aboveground

History
- Opened: January 1, 1905

Key dates
- 20 January 2005: Line 1 opened

Passengers
- (Daily) Based on Jan-Dec of 2012. KR: 1,276; Line 1: 19,656

Services
Preceding station	Seoul Metropolitan Subway	Following station
Osan College towards Kwangwoon University	Line 1	Jinwi towards Sinchang
Byeongjeom towards Cheongnyangni or Seoul	Line 1 Gyeongbu Express	Seojeong-ri towards Sinchang
Preceding station	Korail	Following station
Suwon towards Seoul	ITX-Saemaeul Gyeongbu Line	Seojeong-ri towards Busan
Suwon towards Yongsan	ITX-Saemaeul Honam Line	Seojeong-ri towards Mokpo
Suwon towards Seoul	Mugunghwa-ho Gyeongbu Line	Seojeong-ri towards Busan
Suwon towards Yongsan	Mugunghwa-ho Honam Line	Pyeongtaek towards Gwangju
Suwon towards Seoul	Mugunghwa-ho Chungbuk Line	Pyeongtaek towards Jecheon
Suwon towards Yongsan	Mugunghwa-ho Jeolla Line	Seojeong-ri towards Yeosu-Expo
Location

Osan Station is a train station on the Gyeongbu Line, and is also served by Seoul Subway Line 1. This is the main station in the city of Osan. There are many shops and restaurants located just outside the station. There is a bus terminal located next to the station and many local buses stop in front of the station. The name of the station was named after the area's surrounding area.
