= Cheonan station =

Train station in Cheonan, South Korea

천안
Cheonan
천안; Cheonan
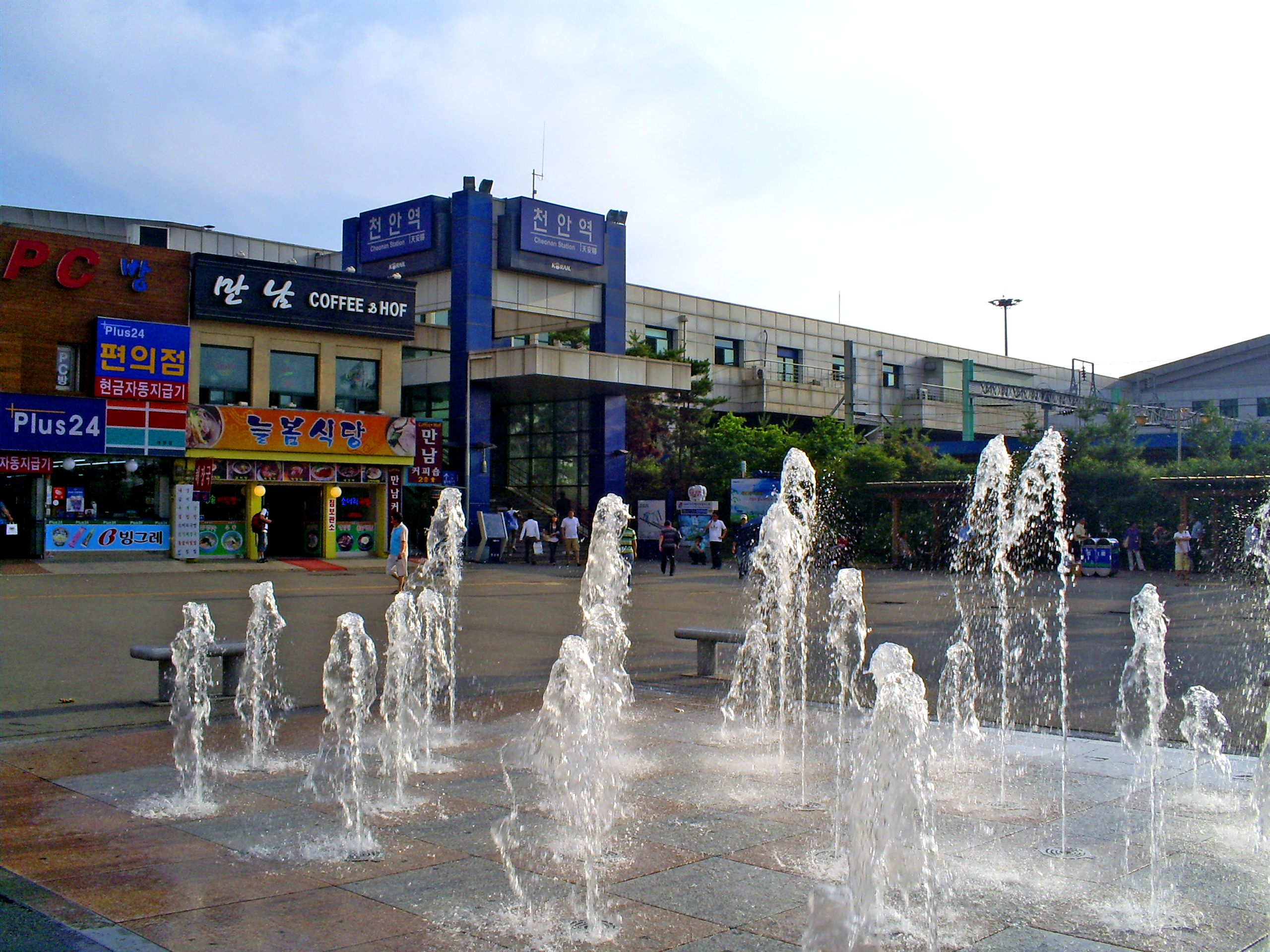

Korean name
- Hangul: 천안역
- Hanja: 天安驛
- RR: Cheonan-yeok
- MR: Ch'ŏnan-yŏk

General information
- Location: 57-1 Daeheung-dong, 239 Daeheung-ro, Dongnam-gu, Cheonan-si, Chungcheongnam-do
- Coordinates: 36°48′33″N 127°08′40″E
- Operator: Korail
- Lines: Gyeongbu Line; Janghang Line
- Platforms: 4
- Tracks: 8

Construction
- Structure type: Aboveground

History
- Opened: January 1, 1905; January 20, 2005

Passengers
- (Daily) Based on Jan-Dec of 2012. KR: 20,395; Line 1: 19,149

Services
Preceding station	Seoul Metropolitan Subway	Following station
Dujeong towards Kwangwoon University	Line 1	Bongmyeong towards Sinchang
Dujeong towards Cheongnyangni or Seoul	Line 1 Gyeongbu Express	Bongmyeong towards Sinchang
Preceding station	Korail	Following station
Seonghwan towards Seoul	ITX-Saemaeul Gyeongbu Line	Jochiwon towards Busan
Pyeongtaek towards Seoul	ITX-Saemaeul Gyeongjeon Line	Jochiwon towards Jinju
Pyeongtaek towards Yongsan	ITX-Saemaeul Honam Line	Jochiwon towards Mokpo
Pyeongtaek towards Yongsan	ITX-Saemaeul Gwangju Line	Jochiwon towards Gwangju
Pyeongtaek towards Yongsan	ITX-Saemaeul Jeolla Line	Jochiwon towards Yeosu-Expo
Pyeongtaek towards Seoul	ITX-Maum Gyeongbu Line	Jochiwon towards Busan
Seonghwan towards Seoul	ITX-Maum Gyeongbu Line via Seonghwan	Jochiwon towards Busan
Pyeongtaek towards Yongsan	ITX-Maum Honam Line	Jochiwon towards Mokpo
Pyeongtaek towards Yongsan	ITX-Maum Jeolla Line	Jochiwon towards Yeosu-Expo
Pyeongtaek towards Yongsan	ITX-Maum Janghang Line	Asan towards Hongseong
Pyeongtaek Next counterclockwise	ITX-Maum Pyeongtaek Line	Asan Next clockwise
Pyeongtaek towards Yongsan	Saemaeul-ho Janghang Line	Asan towards Iksan
Seonghwan towards Seoul	Mugunghwa-ho Gyeongbu Line	Jeonui towards Busan
Pyeongtaek towards Yongsan	Mugunghwa-ho Honam Line	Jeonui towards Mokpo
Seonghwan towards Yongsan	Mugunghwa-ho Honam Line	Jochiwon towards Gwangju
Pyeongtaek towards Seoul	Mugunghwa-ho Chungbuk Line	Jeonui towards Jecheon
Pyeongtaek towards Yongsan	Mugunghwa-ho Janghang Line	Asan towards Iksan
Seonghwan towards Yongsan	Mugunghwa-ho Jeolla Line	Jeonui towards Yeosu-Expo
Suwon towards Seoul	S-Train West	Seodaejeon towards Yeosu-Expo
Pyeongtaek towards Seoul	Chungbuk Yeongdong Gugak Wine Train	Daejeon towards Yeongdong
Location

Cheonan station (Korean: 천안역) is the main train station in central Cheonan, South Korea, and the junction of the Gyeongbu and Janghang lines. It has also been served by Seoul Subway Line 1 since 2005.

== Gallery ==
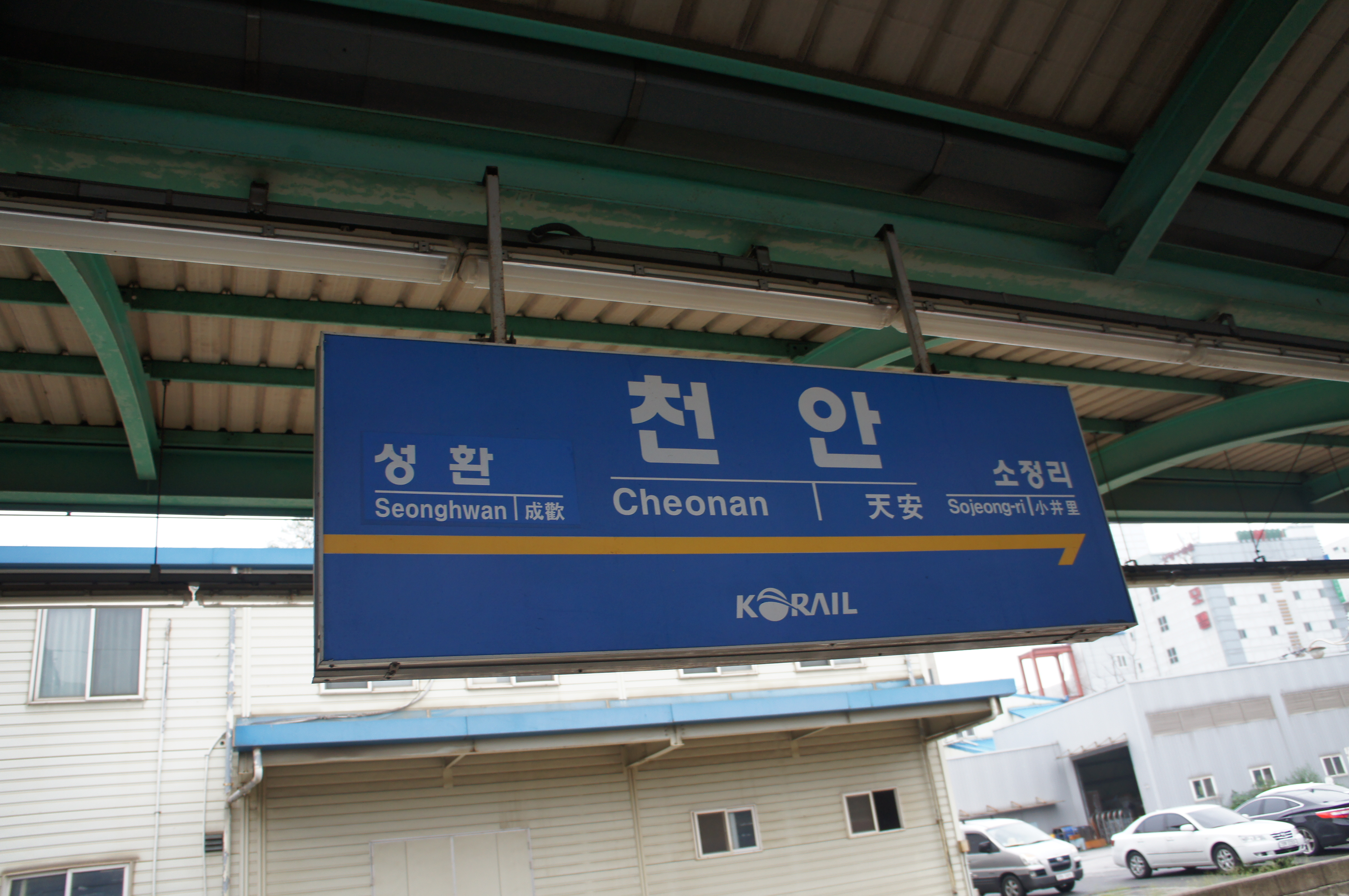
Station nameplate (Gyeongbu Line)

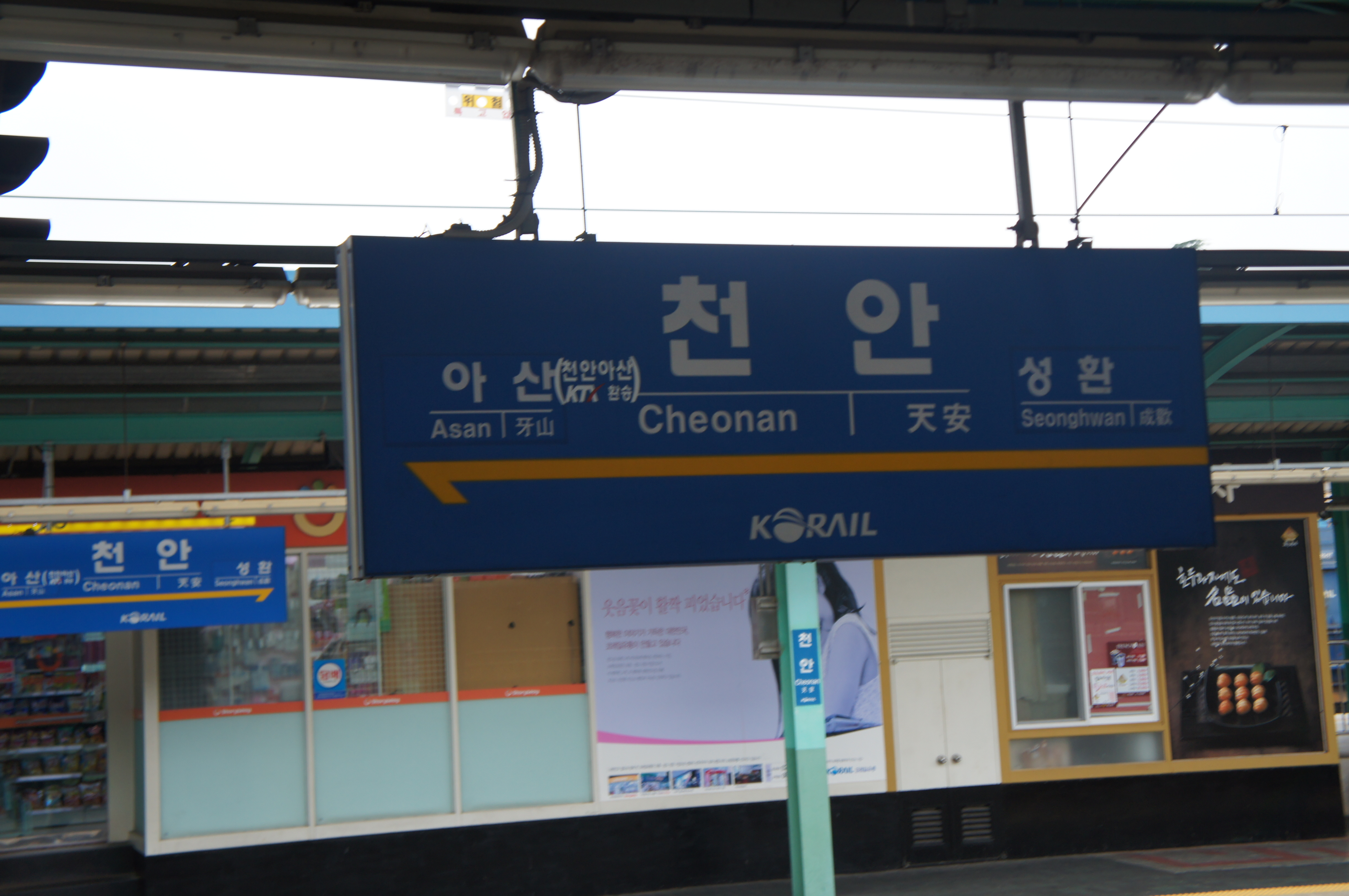
Station nameplate (Janghang Line)

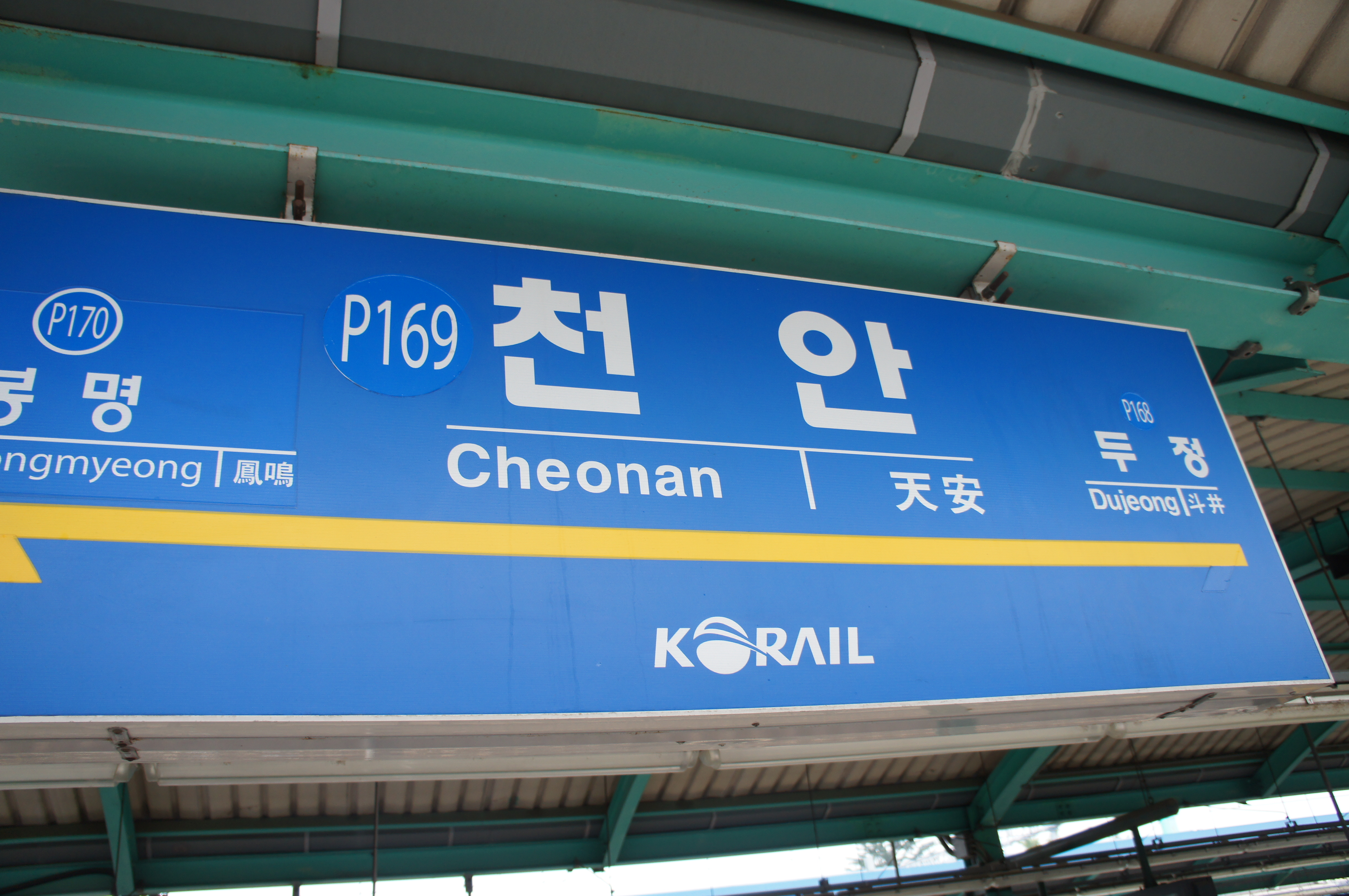
Station nameplate (Line 1)

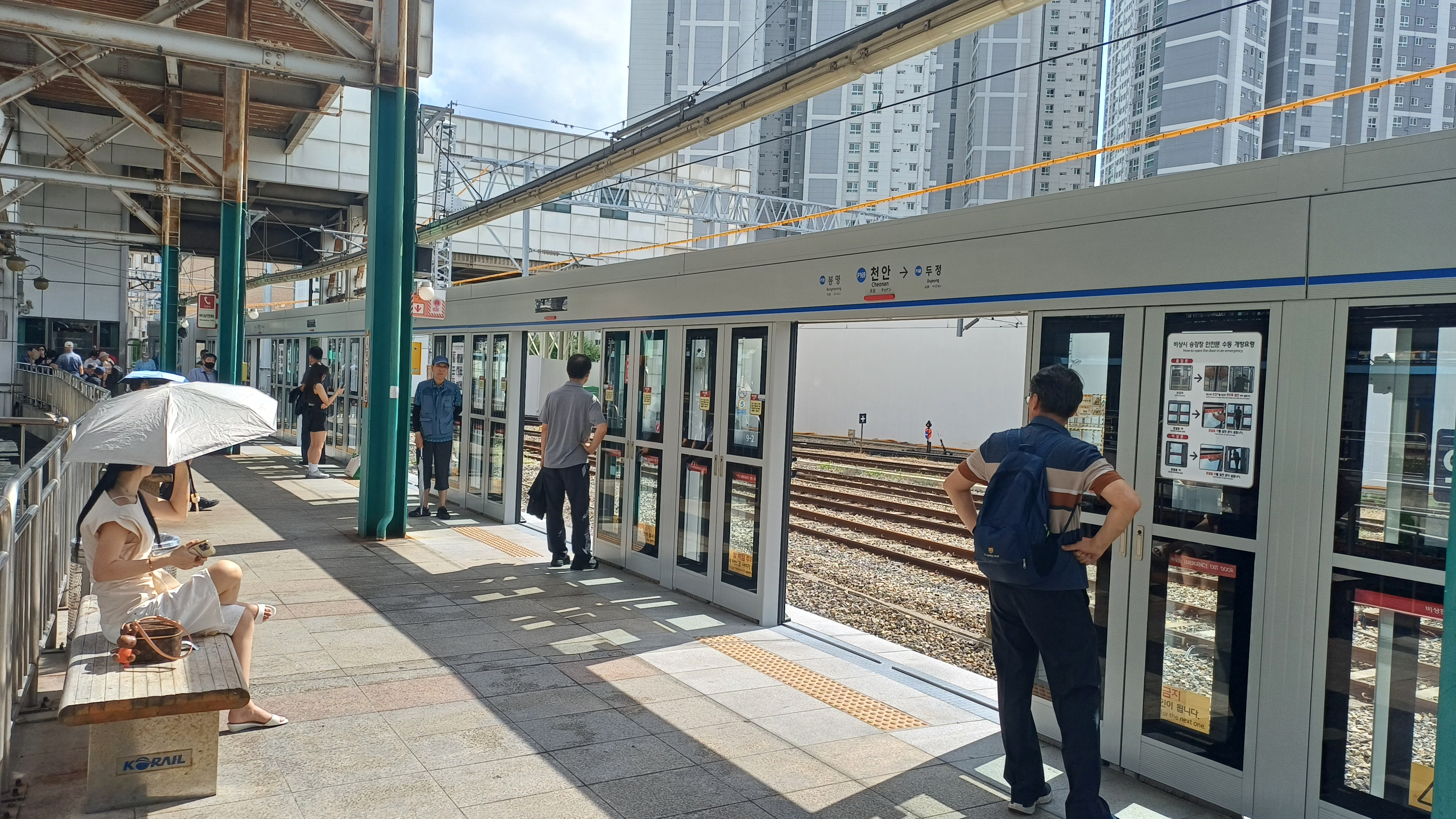
Line 1 platform
