= Osan =

City in Gyeonggi, South Korea

Coordinates: 37°08′59″N 127°04′38″E

- Municipal City
- Flag Emblem of Osan

- Location in South Korea
- Country: South Korea
- Region: Gyeonggi Province (Sudogwon)
- Administrative divisions: 6 dong

Area
  - Total: 42.76 km^{2} (16.51 sq mi)

Population (September 2024)
  - Total: 238,788
  - Density: 2,824.2/km^{2} (7,315/sq mi)
  - Dialect: Seoul

Korean name
- Hangul: 오산시
- Hanja: 烏山市
- RR: Osan-si
- MR: Osan-si

Osan (Korean: 오산; Korean pronunciation: [o.san]) is a city in Gyeonggi Province, South Korea, approximately 35 km (22 mi) south of Seoul. The population of the city is around 200,000. The local economy is supported by a mix of agricultural and industrial enterprises.

It is famous for one of the largest markets in South Korea, Osan Market, which has been in continuous operation since 1792. The city was the scene of the first battle between the US and North Korea during the Korean War in 1950; there is a statue and museum dedicated to UN forces on the outskirts of the city.

The United States Air Force base named after the city, Osan Air Base, is not actually located in the city, but is instead 8 km (5.0 mi) south, in the Songtan district (formerly a separate city) of Pyeongtaek.

Osan Station is a large subway station located in the heart of Osan. It is part of the Seoul Subway Line 1 and the KTX. There is a bus terminal next to the subway station and many buses stop in front of the subway station.

== Name ==
Osan came to be called by its current name in 1914, at the time of a general reorganization of local governments under Japanese rule. At that time it became Osan-myeon, part of Suwon. This name in turn was taken from that of a local stream, the Osancheon. However, prior to the Japanese occupation, the name had been rendered in hanja as 鰲山, meaning "soft-shelled turtle mountain." Because of the complexity of the 鰲 ("o") character, and because crows were abundant in the area, the Japanese changed the name to 烏山, meaning "crow mountain school."

== Administrative districts ==
The administrative districts of Osan consists of six administrative districts and 24 legal districts. Osan has a population of 228,111 and 97,348 households as of the end of June 2020.

| Name | Hangul | Hanja | Household | Population | Area | Legal districts |
|---|---|---|---|---|---|---|
| Chopyeong-dong | 초평동 | 楚坪洞 | 6,946 | 16,204 | 6.48 km^{2} | Beoreum-dong (벌음동; 伐音洞), Dugok-dong (두곡동; 斗谷洞), Part of Gasu-dong (가수동; 佳水洞), Part of Nueup-dong (누읍동; 樓邑洞), Seo-dong (서동; 西洞), Tap-dong (탑동; 塔洞) |
| Daewon-dong | 대원동 | 大園洞 | 26,921 | 64,484 | 6.20 km^{2} | Part of Busan-dong (부산동; 釜山洞), Cheongho-dong (청호동; 淸湖洞), Part of Galgot-dong (갈곶동; 葛串洞), Gohyeon-dong (고현동; 高峴洞), Part of Osan-dong (오산동; 烏山洞), Won-dong (원동; 園洞) |
| Jungang-dong | 중앙동 | 中央洞 | 14,080 | 36,243 | 3.66 km^{2} | Part of Busan-dong, Part of Eungye-dong (은계동; 銀溪洞), Part of Osan-dong |
| Namchon-dong | 남촌동 | 南村洞 | 12,895 | 19,925 | 6.06 km^{2} | Cheonghak-dong (청학동; 靑鶴洞), Gajang-dong (가장동; 佳長洞), Part of Galgot-dong, Part of Gasu-dong, Part of Gwol-dong (궐동; 闕洞), Part of Osan-dong |
| Sema-dong | 세마동 | 洗馬洞 | 12,519 | 31,862 | 13.32 km^{2} | Jigot-dong (지곶동; 紙串洞), Oesammi-dong (외삼미동; 外三美洞), Segyo-dong (세교동; 細橋洞), Seorang-dong (서랑동; 西廊洞), Yangsan-dong (양산동; 陽山洞) |
| Sinjang-dong | 신장동 | 新場洞 | 23,987 | 59,393 | 7.04 km^{2} | Part of Eungye-dong, Geumam-dong (금암동; 錦岩洞), Part of Gwol-dong, Naesammi-dong (내삼미동; 內三美洞), Sucheong-dong (수청동; 水淸洞) |
| Total | | | 97,348 | 228,111 | 42.76 km^{2} | |

== Climate ==
Osan has a humid continental climate (Köppen: Dwa), but can be considered a borderline humid subtropical climate (Köppen: Cwa) using the −3 °C (27 °F) isotherm.

Climate data for Osan (1993–2020 normals)
| Month | Jan | Feb | Mar | Apr | May | Jun | Jul | Aug | Sep | Oct | Nov | Dec | Year |
|---|---|---|---|---|---|---|---|---|---|---|---|---|---|
| Mean daily maximum °C (°F) | 2.6 (36.7) | 5.7 (42.3) | 11.8 (53.2) | 18.8 (65.8) | 24.5 (76.1) | 28.3 (82.9) | 30.0 (86.0) | 31.0 (87.8) | 26.8 (80.2) | 20.7 (69.3) | 12.6 (54.7) | 4.7 (40.5) | 18.1 (64.6) |
| Daily mean °C (°F) | −2.6 (27.3) | −0.1 (31.8) | 5.4 (41.7) | 11.9 (53.4) | 17.6 (63.7) | 22.1 (71.8) | 25.2 (77.4) | 25.7 (78.3) | 21.0 (69.8) | 14.1 (57.4) | 7.0 (44.6) | −0.4 (31.3) | 12.2 (54.0) |
| Mean daily minimum °C (°F) | −7.4 (18.7) | −5.2 (22.6) | −0.1 (31.8) | 5.7 (42.3) | 11.8 (53.2) | 17.3 (63.1) | 21.7 (71.1) | 22.2 (72.0) | 16.5 (61.7) | 8.8 (47.8) | 1.9 (35.4) | −5.0 (23.0) | 7.4 (45.3) |
| Average precipitation mm (inches) | 15.3 (0.60) | 24.2 (0.95) | 34.6 (1.36) | 76.0 (2.99) | 92.2 (3.63) | 114.9 (4.52) | 342.2 (13.47) | 257.4 (10.13) | 134.2 (5.28) | 52.7 (2.07) | 42.6 (1.68) | 18.1 (0.71) | 1,204.4 (47.42) |
| Average precipitation days (≥ 0.1 mm) | 3.6 | 3.5 | 5.0 | 6.4 | 6.9 | 7.2 | 12.7 | 12.0 | 7.1 | 4.7 | 6.5 | 5.1 | 80.7 |
Source: Korea Meteorological Administration

== Sister cities ==
- Hidaka, Saitama, Japan
- Ürümqi, Xinjiang, China
- Killeen, Texas, U.S.
- Miami, Florida, U.S.
- Qazvin, Iran

== Economy ==
Kyochon, a fried chicken chain, has its head office in Osan.

== See also ==
- List of cities in South Korea
- Geography of South Korea
