= Seobuk District =

Coordinates: 36.8784°N 127.155194°E

- Non-autonomous District
- Seongseong Lake Park and the buildings surrounding it

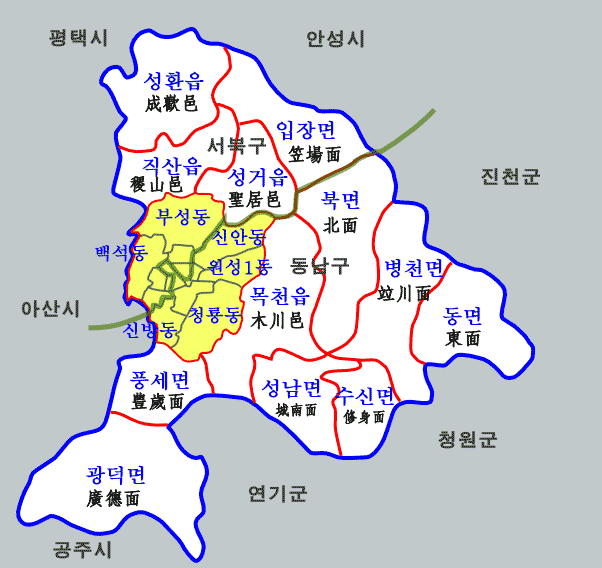
- Seobuk District is located in the northwestern part of Cheonan.
- Country: South Korea
- Region: Hoseo
- Province: South Chungcheong
- City: Cheonan
- Administrative divisions: 9 dong, 3 eup, 1 myeon

Area
  - Total: 197.73 km^{2} (76.34 sq mi)

Population (2012)
  - Total: 326,260
  - Density: 1,650/km^{2} (4,300/sq mi)
  - Dialect: Chungcheong
- Website: Seobuk District Office

Korean name
- Hangul: 서북구
- Hanja: 西北區
- RR: Seobuk-gu
- MR: Sŏbuk-ku

Seobuk District (Korean: 서북구) is a non-autonomous district of Cheonan, South Chungcheong Province, South Korea.

== Administrative divisions ==
Seobuk District is divided into 3 towns (eup), one township (myeon), and 9 neighbourhoods (dong).

	Hangul	Hanja
Seonghwan-eup	성환읍	成歡邑
Seonggeo-eup	성거읍	聖居邑
Jiksan-eup	직산읍	稷山邑
Ipjang-myeon	입장면	笠場面
Seongjeong-dong	성정1동	星井洞
Seongjeong-dong	성정2동	星井洞
Ssangyong-dong	쌍용1동	雙龍洞
Ssangyong-dong	쌍용2동	雙龍洞
Ssangyong-dong	쌍용3동	雙龍洞
Baekseok-dong	백석동	白石洞
Buldang-dong	불당동	佛堂洞
Buseong-dong	부성1동	富城洞
Buseong-dong	부성2동	富城洞

== See also ==
- Dongnam District
