= Gwangmyeong =

City in Gyeonggi, South Korea

- Municipal City
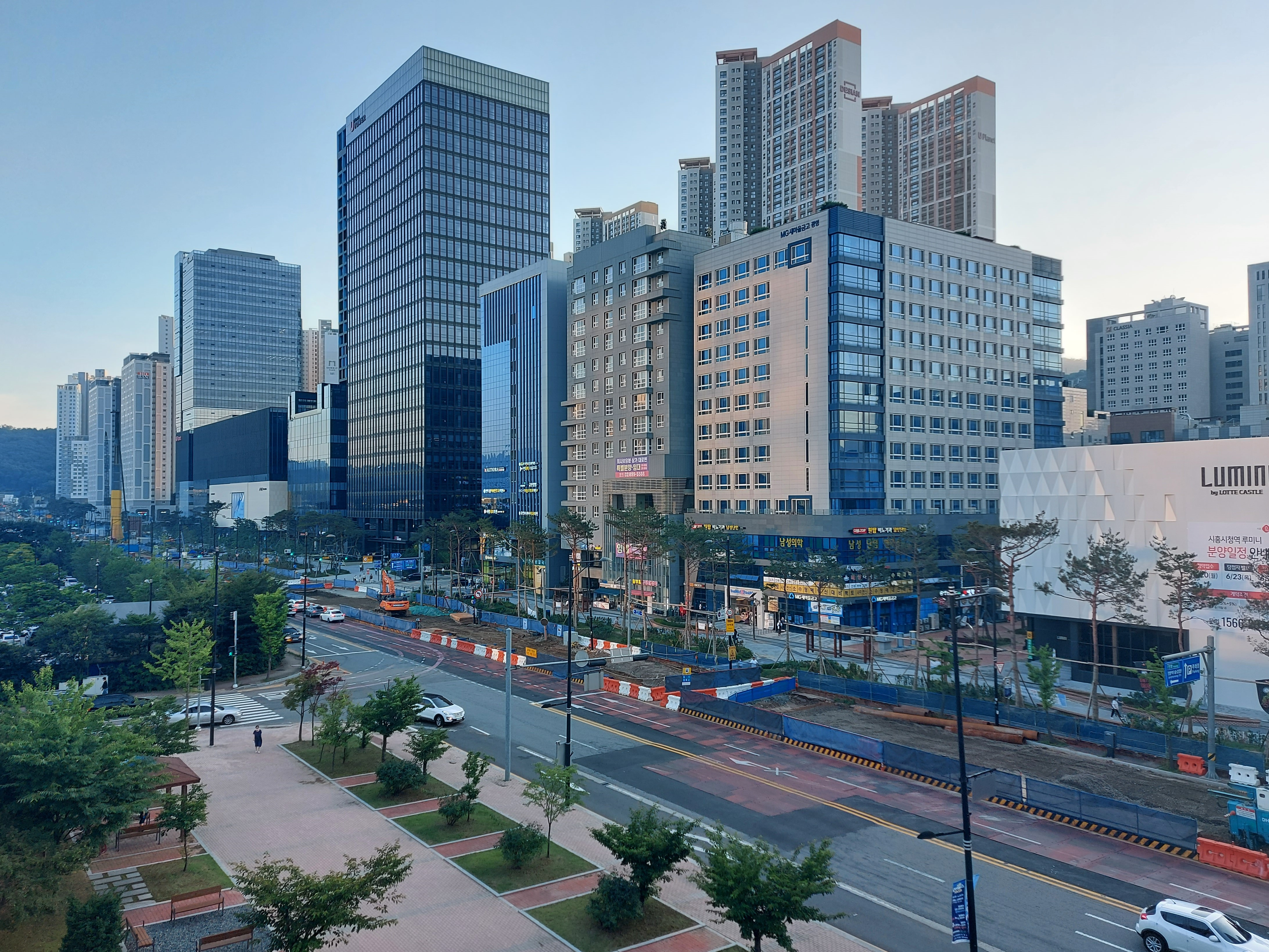
- Deokan-ro, Gwangmyeong

- Flag Historical Symbol

- Location in South Korea
- Coordinates: 37°28′34″N 126°51′58″E
- Country: South Korea
- Region: Gyeonggi Province (Sudogwon)
- Administrative divisions: 18 villages

Government
  - mayor: Park Seung-won (박승원)

Area
  - Total: 38.5 km^{2} (14.9 sq mi)

Population (September 2024)
  - Total: 277,564
  - Density: 7,210/km^{2} (18,700/sq mi)
  - Dialect: Seoul

Korean name
- Hangul: 광명시
- Hanja: 光明市
- RR: Gwangmyeong-si
- MR: Kwangmyŏng-si

Gwangmyeong (Korean: 광명; Korean pronunciation: [ˈkwaŋ.mjʌŋ]) is a city in Gyeonggi Province, South Korea. It borders Seoul to the east, north and northeast, Anyang to the southeast, Siheung to the southwest, and Bucheon to the northwest. It is home to one of the world's largest IKEA stores at 59,000 square meters (640,000 square feet), along with a large Costco store and a Lotte Premium Outlet.

== History ==
Gwangmyeong area was part of the old (or original) Siheung County as with Yeongdeungpo, Guro, and Geumcheon areas. It belonged to West and South townships of original Siheung County. In 1914, the two townships were merged into West township of "expanded" Siheung County.

In 1963, the northern part of Gwangmyeong (at that time, the northern part of West Township in Siheung County) area was merged into an expanded Seoul (i.e. districts for urban planning in Seoul). as with Gwacheon (at that time Gwacheon was a township in Siheung County) and Sindo township of Goyang County (now parts of the city Goyang, which borders Seoul). The neighbourhood of Gwangmyeong (Gwangmyeong-dong) and Cheolsan (Cheolsan-dong) were developed as a residence zone next to Seoul and it was provisionally planned to be administratively merged with Seoul. In 1974, Gwangmyeong-ri and Cheolsan-ri became a part of the county branch of Gwangmyeong and in 1979 southern part of Gwangmyeong area became Soha town. In 1981, the annexation to Seoul foundered as Seoul's unexpected rapid growth greatly concerned government officials. Consequently, the county branch of Gwangmyeong and Soha town merged and formed a new city of Gwangmyeong, instead of being annexed to Guro District, Seoul.

In the 1980s and the early 1990s, many apartment complexes were built in Cheolsan-dong and Haan-dong. The population increased up to 300,000. In 1995, the Seoul-Gwangmyeong boundary was readjusted, in which a tiny part of Cheolsan-dong was merged into the newly created Geumcheon District, Seoul. In 2004, Gwangmyeong Station was open, and in 2010, apartment complexes in Soha-dong were built up.

== Districts ==
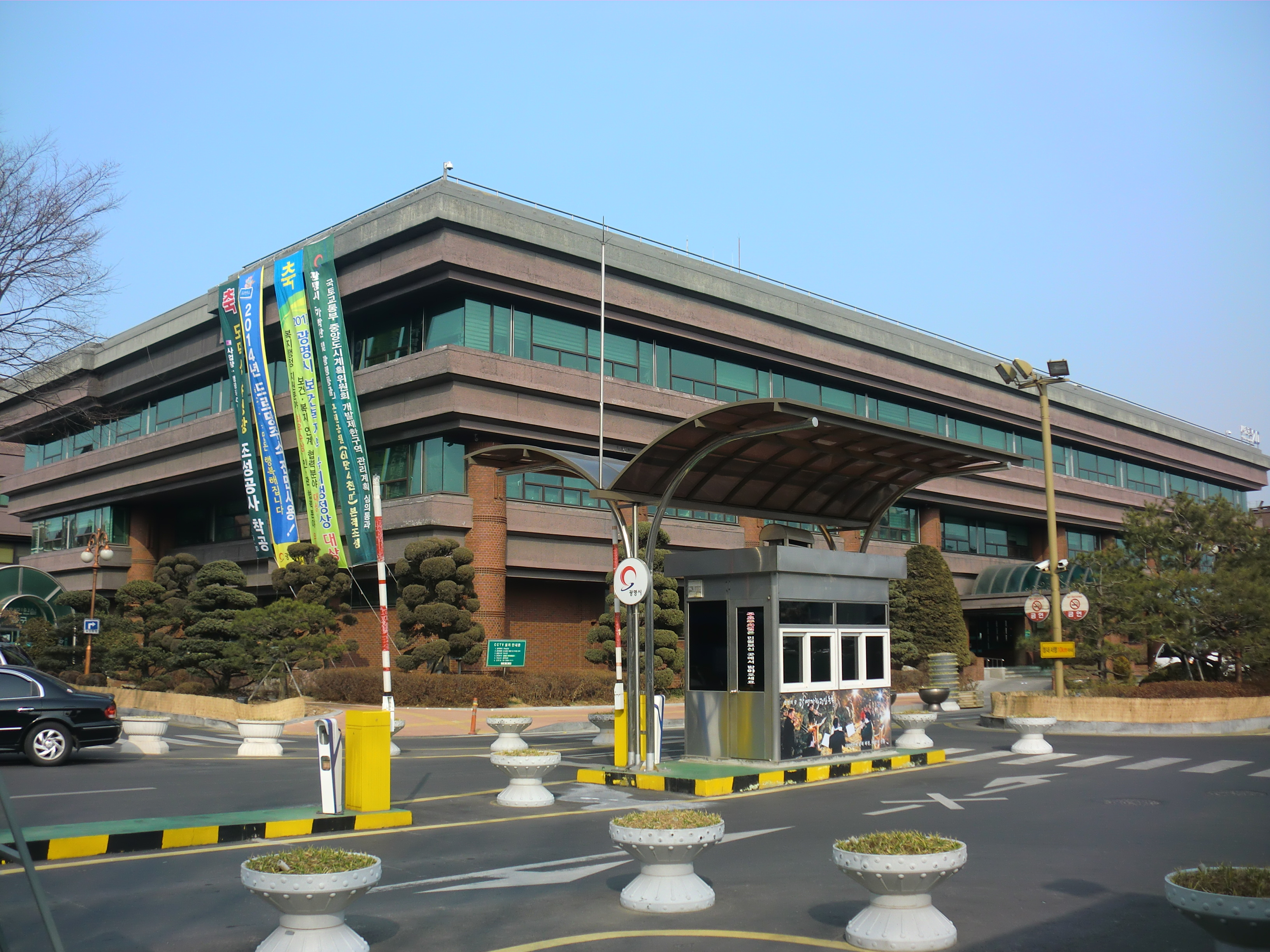
Gwangmyeong City Hall

There are 18 administrative districts (dong in Korean language) in Gwangmyeong. Specifically, these are: Gwangmyeong Dong (from 1-7; Gwangmyeong 6-dong is also known as Okgil dong), Cheolsan Dong (4 dongs), Ha-an Dong (4 dongs), Soha Dong (2 dongs; The southern part of Soha 2-dong is also known as Iljik dong), and Hak-on dong (Gahak-dong and No-onsa dong). In 1995, a tiny section of Gwangmyeong was ceded to Seoul's newly created Geumcheon District.

== Disputes on municipal annexation to Seoul ==
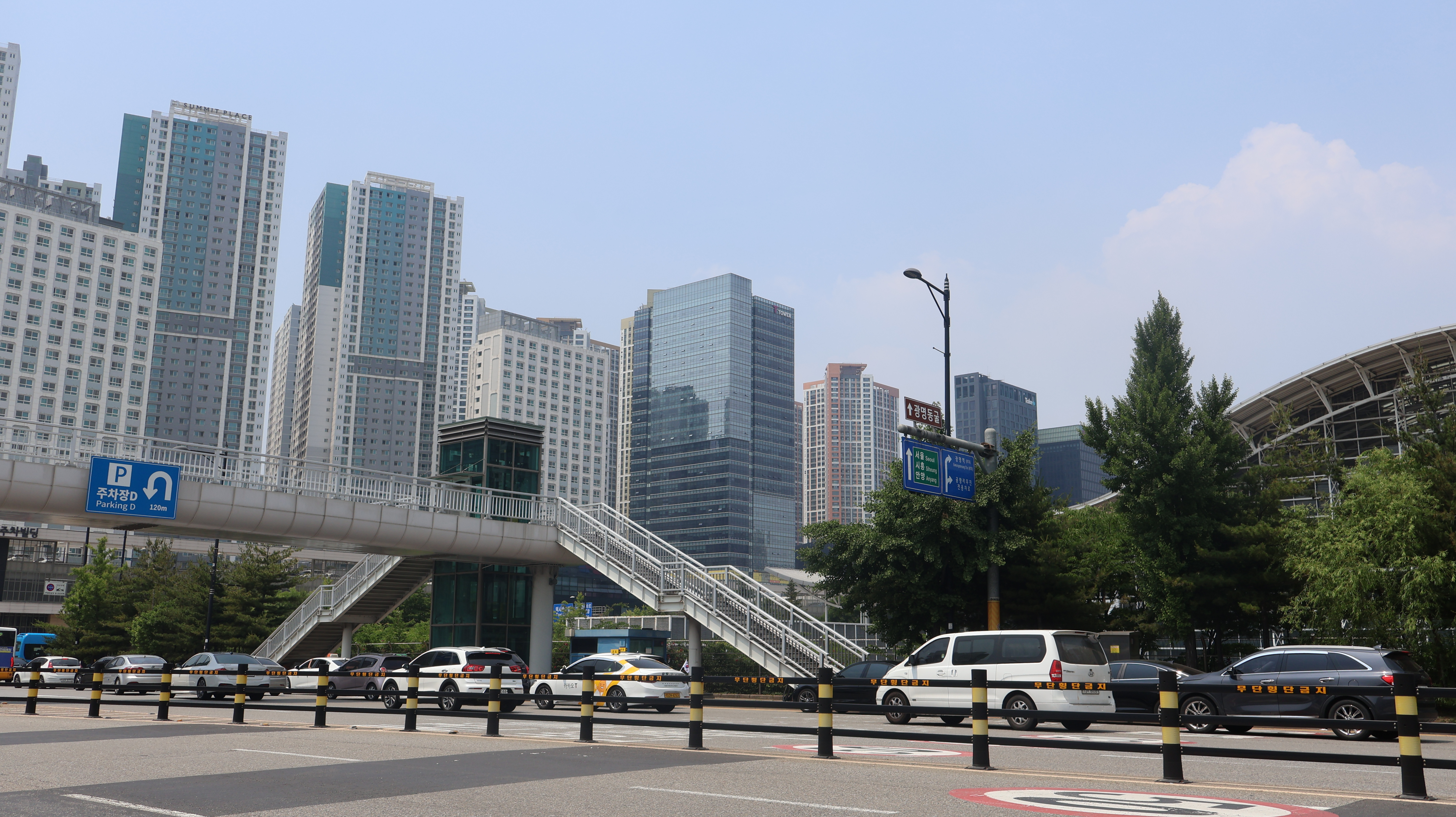
Iljik dong

Due to its history of being part of the urban planning districts of Seoul until December 1982, the living sphere of Gwangmyeong is similar to Seoul's Yeongdeungpo rather than 'Western Gyeonggi's living sphere' such as Bucheon and Anyang. The sewage system is linked to Seoul, though the nearest sewage treatment plant is located on the boundary between Gwangmyeong and Anyang, and the city heavily relies on Seoul's telephone and transport systems (local dial code. The phone area code for Gwangmyeong is Seoul's 02 and many Seoul buses and taxis are in business in that city); advertisements of firms in Yeongdeungpo area can be easily seen in the city. Gwangmyeong not belonging to Seoul, Gwangmyeong residents have to go to a district court office and a reserve soldier's drill camp (of the 51st Infantry Division, Capital Corps) in 'farther' Ansan other than a district court in nearby Sinjeong-dong and a reserve soldier's drill camp (of the 52nd Infantry Division, CDC) in Anyang.

Proponents of the incorporation in Seoul argue that by annexing the city into capital Seoul, in which Gwangmyeong City of Gyeonggi Province becomes Gwangmyeong District of Seoul, the discord between a life zone and administrative districts, in terms of metropolitan governance, can be resolved. They also insist that by the annexation, residents in Gwangmyeong can benefit from metropolitan services and governance of Seoul Metropolitan City, especially in public transport. Congressman and former mayor of Gwangmyeong Baek Jae-hyeon presented a special bill for "municipal annexation to Seoul for Gwangmyeong" on the floor in September 2009, though his attempt turned out in vain at last. Opponents insist that the annexation would tarnish municipal autonomy in Gwangmyeong and it would also worsen balanced development of non-capital areas on the national level. The central government once proposed that Gwangmyeong be merged with Bucheon other than being annexed to Seoul.

== Education ==
There are nine high schools, ten middle schools, and 21 elementary schools in Gwangmyeong. Prior to 2013, middle school students who wished to go to high school had to take the entrance exam. Gwangmyeong-buk High School and Jinseong High School are traditionally well known for higher standards of students' academic ability.

=== Libraries ===
- Gwangmyeong Central Library
- Cheolsan Library
- HaAn Library
- Chunghyeon Library
- Soha Library
- Cheolsandong Library - Completed in June 2020

== Residential areas ==
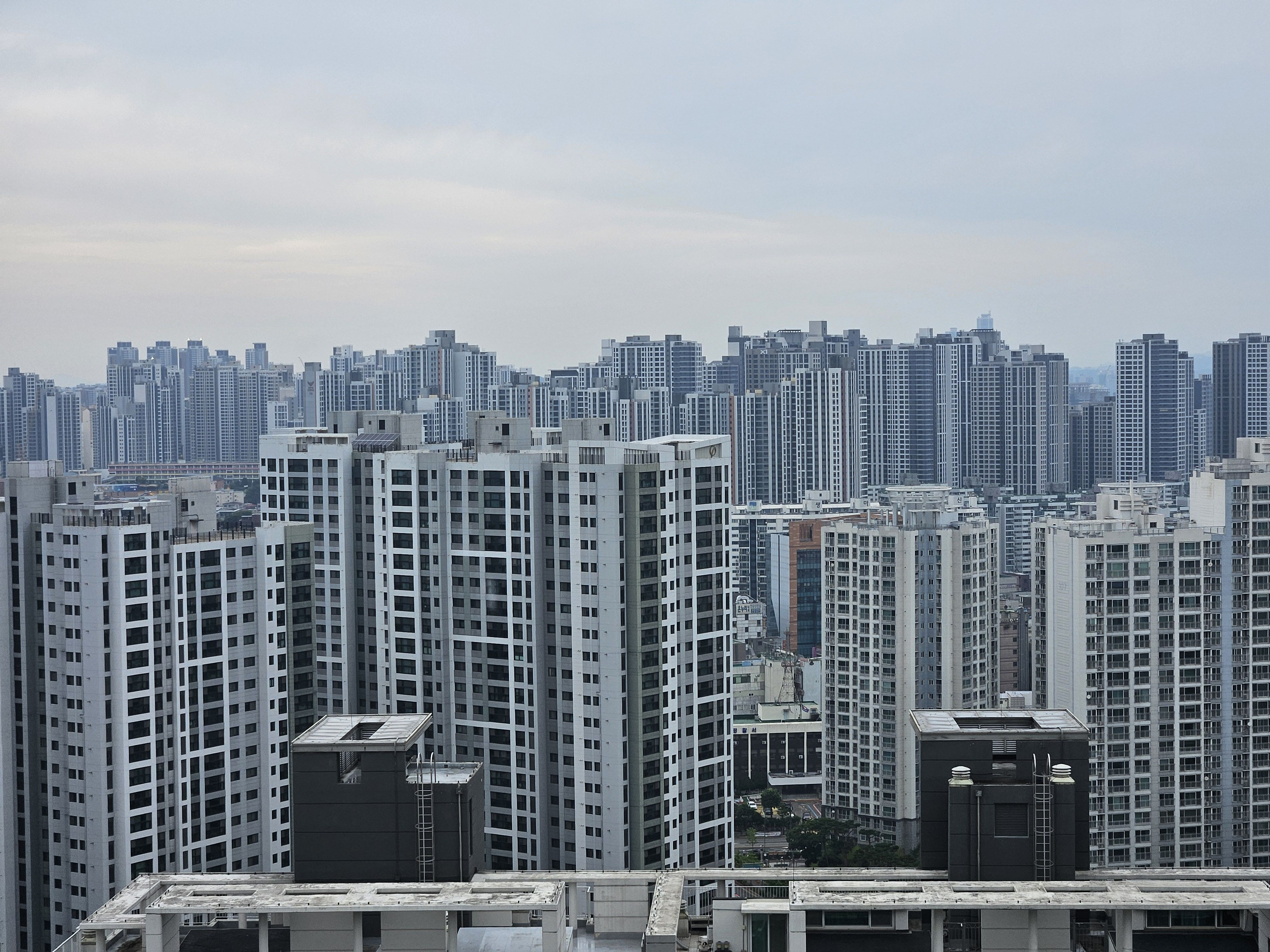
A landscape lined with large apartment complexes in Gwangmyeong

Since Gwangmyeong is a commuter town bordering Seoul, it's mostly a residential area. The northwestern part of Gwangmyeong, namely Gwangmyeong-dong, is mostly composed of low-storeyed detached houses, while the eastern part, namely Cheolsan-dong and Haan-dong, consists of high-storeyed apartment complexes. Throughout the late 2000s, old public low-storeyed apartment complexes in Cheolsan-dong were rebuilt into private high-storeyed apartment complexes. In 2010, some parts of Soha-dong was developed to newly built public apartment complexes.

== Shopping ==
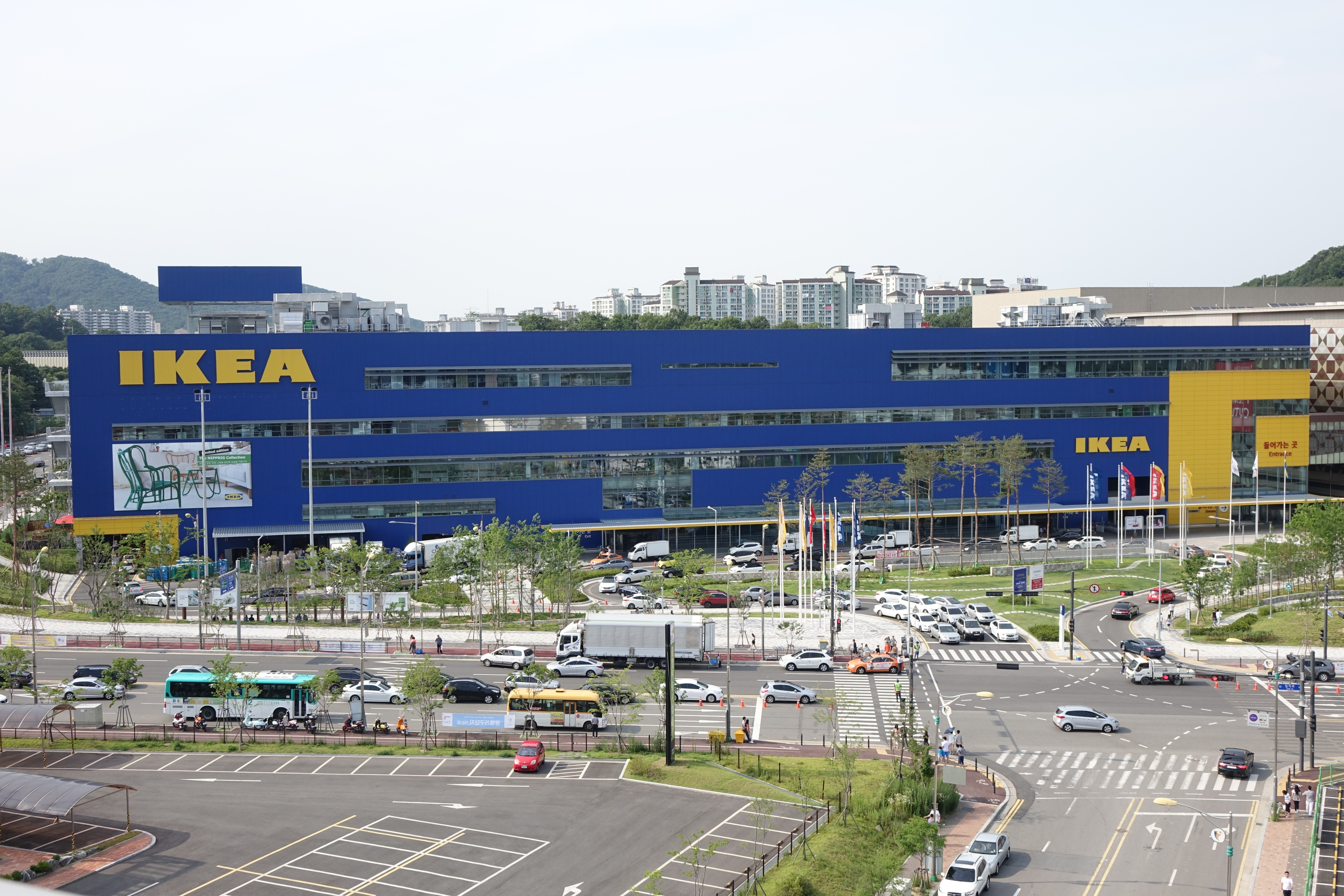
One of the world's largest IKEA stores located near the KTX Gwangmyeong Station in the Seoul Metropolitan Area, South Korea.

Gwangmyeong is home to one of the world's largest IKEA stores, with the second largest store located in Goyang, and a large Lotte Premium Outlet that is connected to the IKEA. The city is also home to a large Costco warehouse which also serves as the headquarters of Costco Korea. A large Korean-style traditional market, Gwangmyeong Market, is located in the Gwangmyeong crossroads with Gwangmyeongsageori Station. Modern shopping malls are in Cheolsan Station, Haan crossroads, and Soha-dong (E-mart and Costco). Gwangmyeong residents can also use shopping malls (Lotte Mart and Homeplus) in nearby Guro District and Geumcheon District. Clothes outlets are located in nearby Gasan-dong in Seoul.

== Medical services ==
A local general hospital, Gwangmyeong Sungae Hospital is in Cheolsan-dong and it is recently affiliated with Medical School of Kwandong University. There are two university hospitals. One is Korea University Medical Center at Guro that is located in nearby Guro-dong, Seoul and other one is Chung-ang University Hospital at Gwangmyeong that is located near Gwangmyeong station A public medical centre is in southernmost Haan-dong.

Many private clinics are located along with business areas in the city.

== Climate ==
Gwangmyeong has a humid continental climate (Köppen: Dwa), but can be considered a borderline humid subtropical climate (Köppen: Cwa) using the −3 °C (27 °F) isotherm.

Climate data for Gwangmyeong (2004–2020 normals)
Month	Jan	Feb	Mar	Apr	May	Jun	Jul	Aug	Sep	Oct	Nov	Dec	Year
Mean daily maximum °C (°F)	2.5 (36.5)	5.6 (42.1)	11.3 (52.3)	17.8 (64.0)	24.0 (75.2)	28.0 (82.4)	29.4 (84.9)	31.0 (87.8)	26.8 (80.2)	20.7 (69.3)	12.5 (54.5)	4.3 (39.7)	17.8 (64.0)
Daily mean °C (°F)	−1.1 (30.0)	1.6 (34.9)	6.7 (44.1)	12.8 (55.0)	18.7 (65.7)	23.2 (73.8)	25.6 (78.1)	27.0 (80.6)	22.6 (72.7)	16.3 (61.3)	8.8 (47.8)	0.8 (33.4)	13.6 (56.5)
Mean daily minimum °C (°F)	−4.3 (24.3)	−2.0 (28.4)	2.8 (37.0)	8.6 (47.5)	14.4 (57.9)	19.3 (66.7)	22.8 (73.0)	24.1 (75.4)	19.2 (66.6)	12.6 (54.7)	5.2 (41.4)	−2.5 (27.5)	10.0 (50.0)
Average precipitation mm (inches)	11.5 (0.45)	26.2 (1.03)	38.3 (1.51)	64.2 (2.53)	96.6 (3.80)	126.4 (4.98)	412.8 (16.25)	231.0 (9.09)	153.8 (6.06)	47.9 (1.89)	58.4 (2.30)	21.7 (0.85)	1,288.8 (50.74)
Average precipitation days (≥ 0.1 mm)	3.0	3.6	5.5	7.6	7.3	8.2	14.6	11.2	7.6	4.6	7.0	5.2	85.4
Source: Korea Meteorological Administration

== Transportation ==
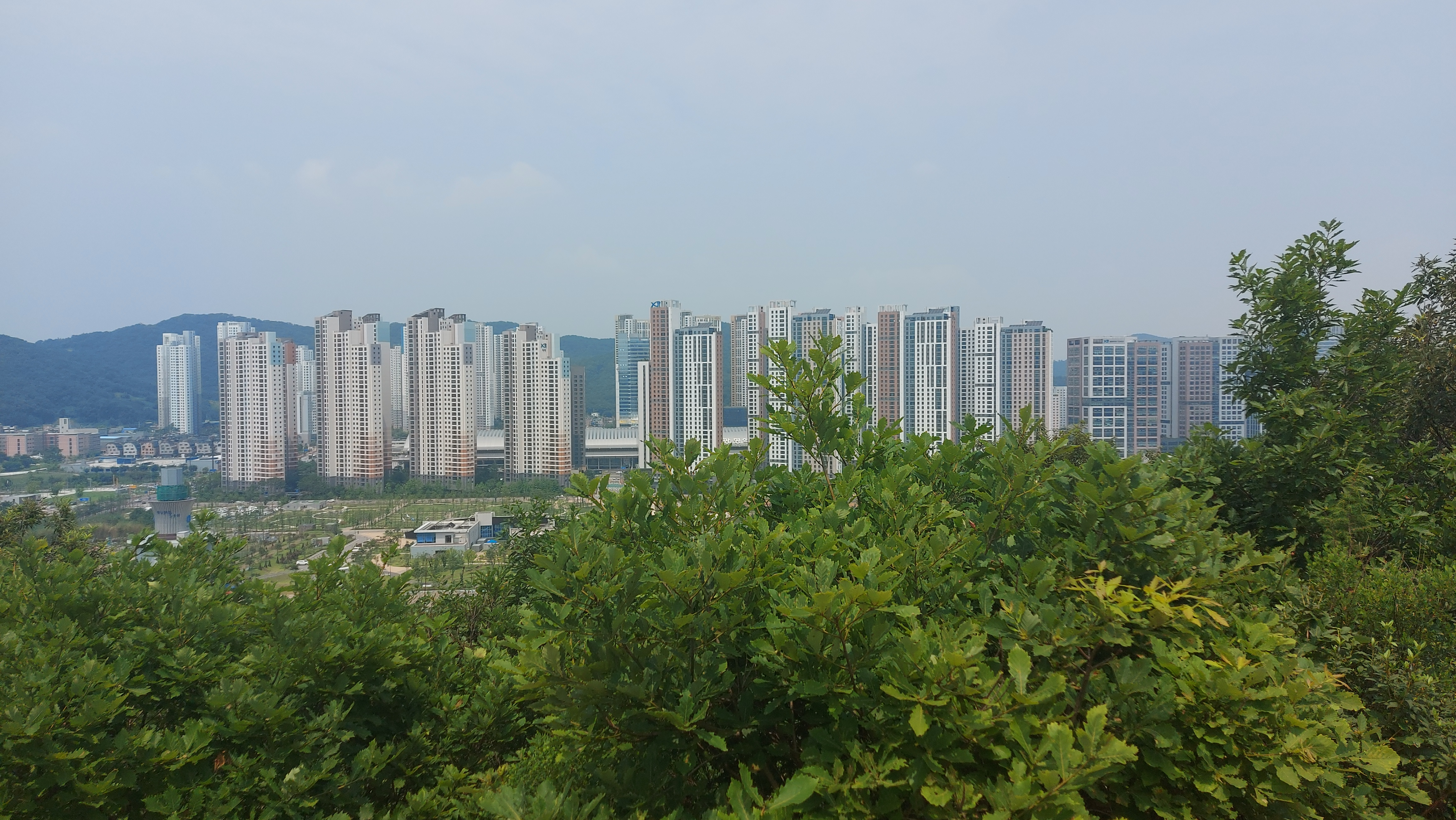
Gwangmyeong skyline with Gwangmyeon Station visible between the buildings

=== Railroads ===
- Korail

- Seoul Subway Line 1 Doksan Station Gwangmyeong Shuttle

(Geumcheon-gu, Seoul) ← Gwangmyeong

- KTX

(Seoul) ← Gwangmyeong → (Southern Gyeonggi Province)

- SMRT

- Seoul Subway Line 7

(Gasan Digital Complex) ← Cheolsan — Gwangmyeongsageori → (Cheonwang)

=== Buses ===
- Hwayeong Bus Corporation: a local bus firm in Gwangmyeong
- Many Seoul buses are in business in Gwangmyeong, as their garages are located in that city.

=== Taxis ===
As of 1999 (provisional)/2004 (permanent), Gwangmyeong's taxi business district was consolidated to Guro and Geumcheon, Seoul. The taxi fare is the same as that of Seoul taxis.

== Attractions ==
The tombs of Yi Sun-sin (not to be confused with the more famous admiral of the same name) and Lee Won-ik are in the city, just north of Gwangmyeong Station. Lee Won Ik's cultural relics are also on display near the site. The city is also home to the Gwangmyeong Velodrome, the largest domed structure in South Korea.

Gwangmyeong Cave, a former mine, now tourist attraction, is located near Gwangmyeong station.

== Industry ==
The city, though small, hosts many firms. In total, there are 630 companies employing 11,636 people.

The city was officially planned to promote small businesses. Such workers can take merits of getting fee for rent, land and even revenue for investment.

=== Kia Motors Sohari Plant ===
In 1973, Kia Motors located its Sohari Plant in Soha-dong, Gwangmyeong, becoming the country's first integrated automobile assembly plant.

As Kia's car factory nearest to Seoul, it has convenient access to labor and other resources and can conveniently provide completed goods to the Seoul metropolitan area.

== Notable people ==
Actor

Jung Kyung-ho, actor

Entertainers

- Onew (Shinee), singer-songwriter
- The Quiett, rapper
- Yoo Yeon-jung (WJSN), singer
- Kim Jun-hyun, comedian
- Park Hyun-bin, trot singer

== Twin towns – sister cities ==
Gwangmyeong is twinned with:

- Austin, United States
- Jecheon, South Korea
- Yesan, South Korea
- Taean, South Korea
- Seocheon, South Korea
- Liaocheng, China
- Osnabrück, Germany
- Yamato, Japan
- Saint-Maurice-de-Cazevieille, France

== See also ==
- Geography of South Korea
