= Gwangmyeong station =

Train station in Gwangmyeong, South Korea

광명
Gwangmyeong
광명; Gwangmyeong
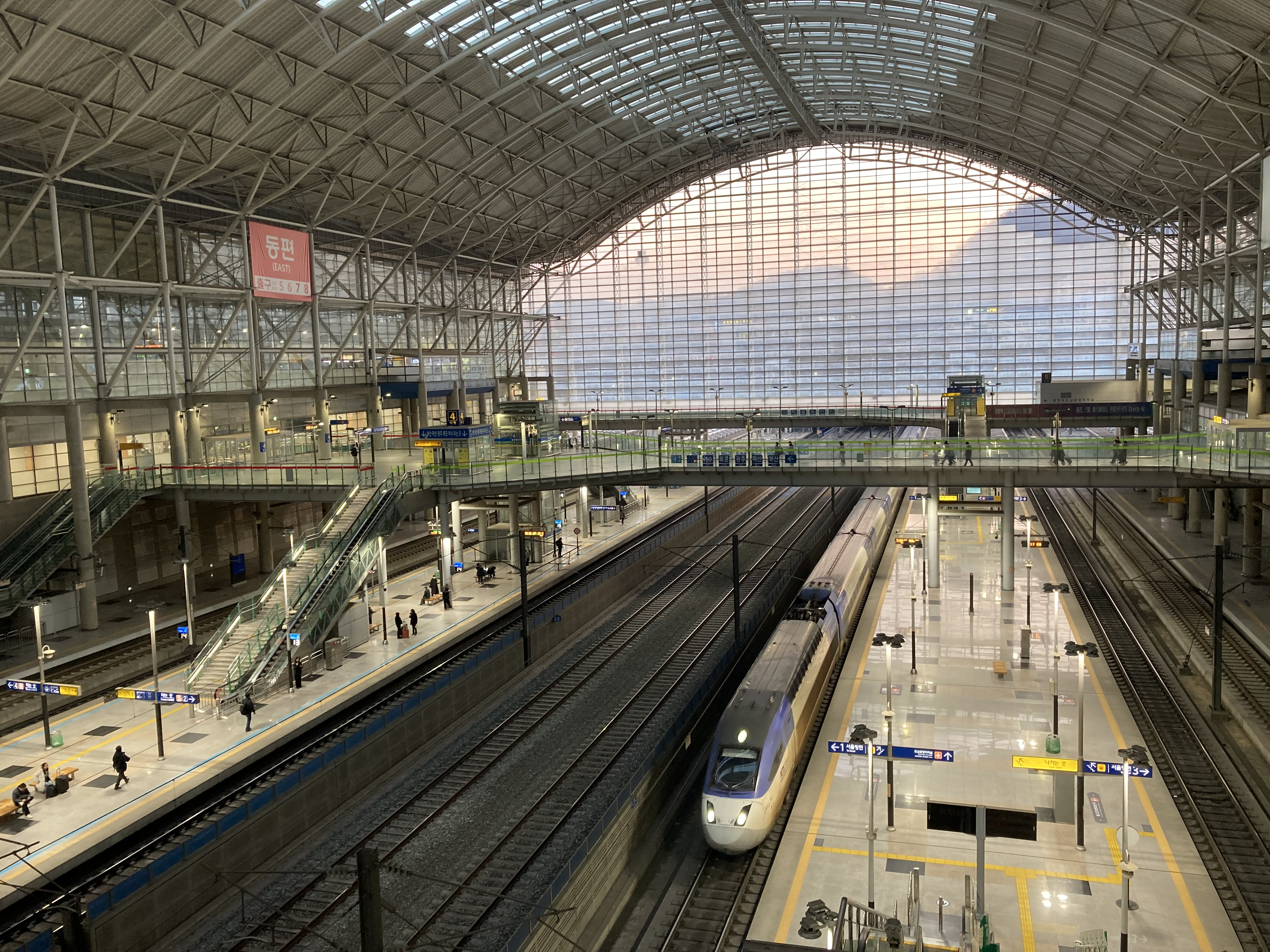

Korean name
- Hangul: 광명역
- Hanja: 光明驛
- RR: Gwangmyeong-yeok
- MR: Kwangmyŏng-yŏk

General information
- Location: 21 Gwangmyeongyeok-ro, Gwangmyeong-si, Gyeonggi Province
- Coordinates: 37°24′59″N 126°53′6″E
- Operator: Korail
- Line: Gyeongbu high-speed railway
- Platforms: 4
- Tracks: 6

Construction
- Structure type: Aboveground

History
- Opened: April 1, 2004

Key dates
- December 15, 2006: Line 1 shuttle service opened

Passengers
- (Daily) Based on Jan–Dec 2012. KTX: 18,602; Line 1: 2,888

Services
Preceding station	Korea Train Express	Following station
Seoul towards Haengsin	Gyeongbu KTX	Cheonan–Asan towards Busan
Seoul towards Haengsin	Gyeongjeon KTX	Cheonan–Asan towards Jinju
Seoul towards Haengsin	Donghae KTX	Cheonan–Asan towards Pohang
Yongsan towards Haengsin	Honam KTX	Cheonan–Asan towards Mokpo
Yongsan towards Haengsin	Jeolla KTX	Cheonan–Asan towards Yeosu-Expo
Yongsan Terminus	Jeolla KTX via Seodaejeon	Cheonan–Asan towards Yeosu-Expo
Preceding station	Seoul Metropolitan Subway	Following station
Geumcheon-gu Office towards Yeongdeungpo	Line 1 Gwangmyeong Shuttle Service	Terminus
Location

Gwangmyeong station (Korean: 광명역) is a train station in Gwangmyeong, South Korea. The station was newly built as a stop of national railway operator Korail's KTX high-speed service, 22.0 km (13.7 mi) south of Seoul Station.

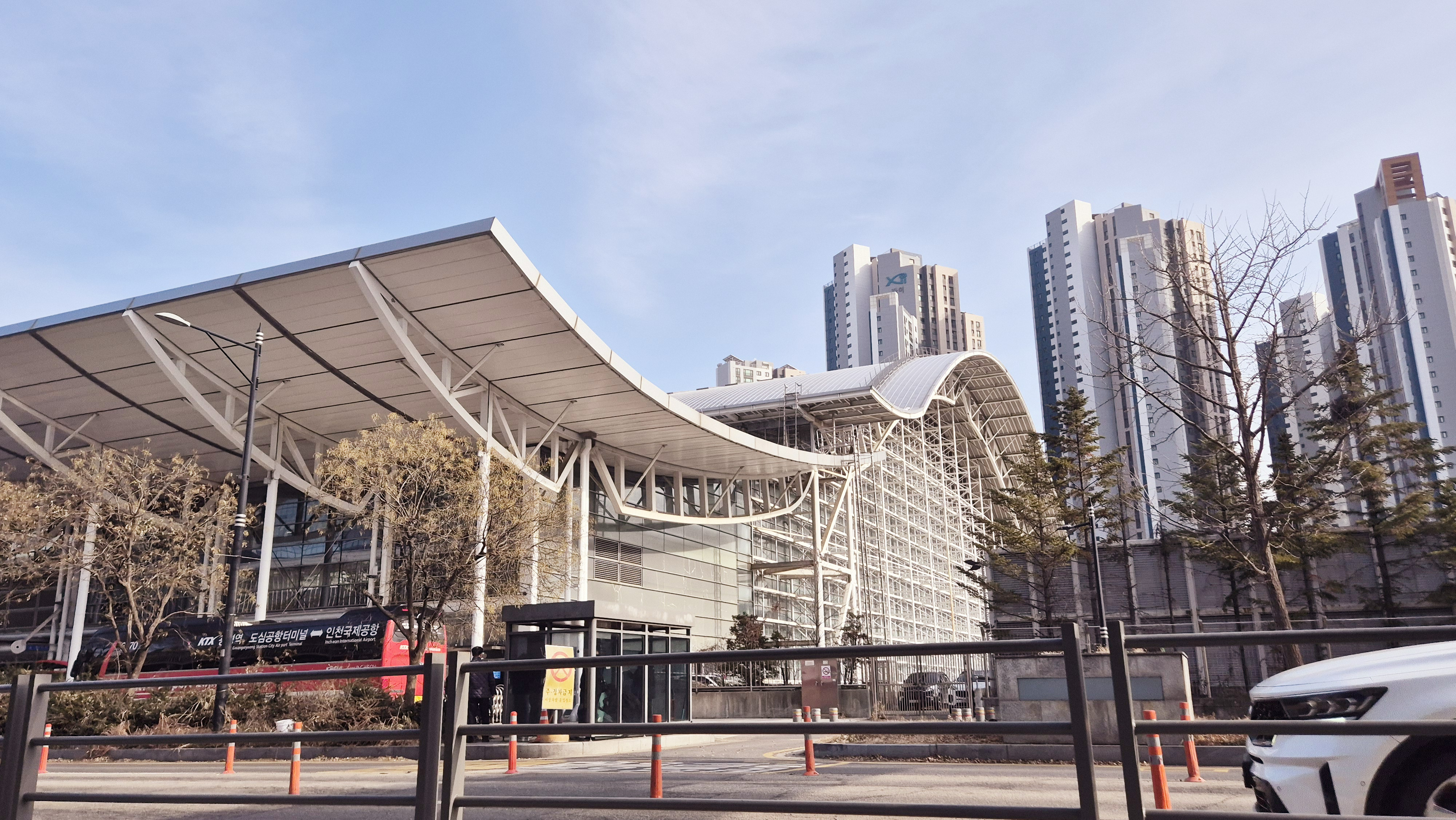
Near the city airport terminal on the side of Exit 4 of Gwangmyeong Station, 2024

The area surrounding the station is home to the world's second largest IKEA store at 59,000 square meters (640,000 square feet), along with a large Costco store and a Lotte Premium Outlet.

== Similarly named stations ==
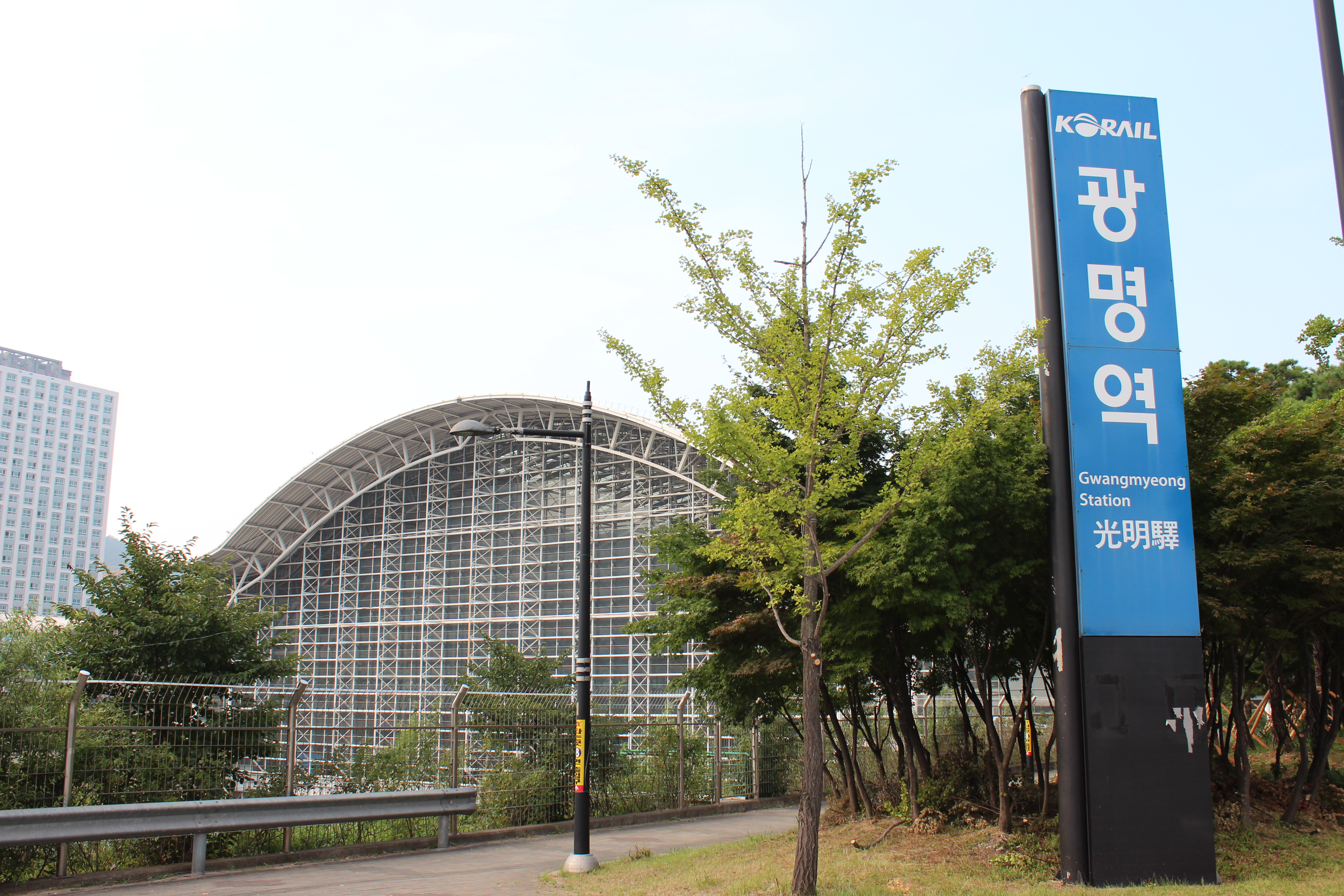
Gwangmyeong Station (2017)

"Gwangmyeong station" is the former name of Gwangmyeongsageori station on Line 7 of the Seoul Subway and is also the name of a station on the Hyoksin Line of the Pyongyang Metro.

== Station layout ==
L3	Overpass connection

L2; Platforms	Side platform, doors will open on the left
L2; Platforms	Southbound	Line 1 Alighting passengers only →
L2; Platforms	Platform 4	KTX Gyeongbu Line toward Busan (Cheonan–Asan) →
L2; Platforms	Island platform, doors will open on the left, right
L2; Platforms	Platform 2	KTX Gyeongbu Line toward Busan (Cheonan–Asan) →
L2; Platforms	Through tracks	KTX Gyeongbu Line does not stop here →
L2; Platforms	Through tracks	← KTX Gyeongbu Line does not stop here
L2; Platforms	Platform 1	← KTX Gyeongbu Line toward Seoul or Haengsin (Seoul)
L2; Platforms	Island platform, doors will open on the left, right
L2; Platforms	Platform 3	← KTX Gyeongbu Line toward Seoul or Haengsin (Seoul)
L2; Platforms	Northbound	← Line 1 toward Yeongdeungpo (Geumcheon-gu Office)
L2; Platforms	Side platform, doors will open on the left

L1; Concourse	Lobby	Customer service, shops, vending machines, ATMs

G	Street level	Exit

== History ==
=== Construction ===
The location of Gwangmyeong station was finalised on October 14, 1994, though construction did not begin until December 1999. The planned name of Namseoul station (literally meaning South Seoul station) was changed to Gwangmyeong station on August 28, 2000, and the station building was completed on March 27, 2004.

Construction cost was 406.8 billion won.

=== Operation ===
The station opened with the start of KTX service on April 1, 2004.

After opening in April 2004, Gwangmyeong station was used by only an average 4,521 passengers a day. However, ridership growth was one of the fastest among KTX stations, and the daily number of KTX passengers arriving or departing at the station reached 14,608 in 2008, surpassing Yongsan station, the Seoul terminus of Honam KTX services. In the first five years of service, until the end of February 2009, Gwangmyeong Station saw a total of 22,173,792 passenger boardings, again surpassing Yongsan Station.

In passenger surveys conducted in the first months after the launch of KTX service, the problem mentioned most often was the lack of adequate local access for intermediate stations, especially the lack of a subway connection to the two new stations Gwangmyeong and Cheonan-Asan. Gwangmyeong station was linked to Seoul Subway Line 1 by a shuttle service from Yongsan on December 15, 2006. However, the shuttle uses the same tracks as the KTX trains, resulting in a schedule with long waiting times between the arrival of KTX and subway trains, thus the service had little impact. A 2008 survey of KTX passengers arriving or departing at Gwangmyeong station found that 57% used private cars, 11% took a taxi, 28% took a bus, and only 4% took the subway train.

When an additional KTX stop was proposed in 2004 at nearby Yeongdeungpo station, some locals living around Gwangmyeong station feared that Korail would kill Gwangmyeong station by migrating all services to the new station, and formed an action group against the plan. The action group gathered 880,000 signatures, forcing the government to drop the plans in late 2005. When Yeongdeungpo station was made a KTX stop for new services via Suwon starting with November 1, 2010, protests resumed.

== Building ==
Gwangmyeong station is a glass structure surrounded by large car parking spaces. Outside of Exit 1 is a large Costco, and in the same direction one can also access a nearby CJ CGV cinema, the Chung-Ang University Gwangmyeong Hospital, LOTTE Mall Gwangmyeong and the adjacent IKEA Gwangmyeong, the first IKEA store in the Korean Peninsula and second-largest in the world. Standing on a plot of land measuring 264,131 square metres (2,843,080 ft^{2}), the interior of the 48,184 square metres (518,650 ft^{2}) building is open, with the tracks, which approach the station from both directions through cuttings, sunken below the main concourse, yet visible to passengers waiting at ground level. There are two stories above ground level and two below. The building measures 297 by 148 metres (974 ft × 486 ft) in terms of internal available space. Originally meant to be the terminus for KTX lines, the size of the station was constructed accordingly. As the terminus changed to Seoul and Yongsan, the large difference between capacity and actual use the station and most prominently due to the size of the station, it has earned the nickname Gwangmyeong Airport by rail enthusiasts.

== Services ==
Gwangmyeong station is served by KTX trains on both the Gyeongbu and Honam KTX services. Shuttle trains run every 40 min-1 hour to Yeongdeungpo, joining the Gyeongbu Line section of Line 1 at Siheung station in Seoul. Gwangmyeong station is not connected directly to other subway stations in the city of Gwangmyeong, namely Cheolsan and Gwangmyeongsageori, so it is necessary to change trains at Gasan Digital Complex station in Seoul to travel there, or just take one of the many buses traveling to the station.

Gwangmyeong station is served by the Korail KTX Airport Limousine Bus (Bus route 6770) which goes directly from the station to Incheon International Airport. Gwangmyeong Station has a City Airport Terminal similar to Seoul Station where passengers departing from Incheon International Airport can complete check-in and baggage drop-off depending on the airline that they will be flying on.

== Gallery ==
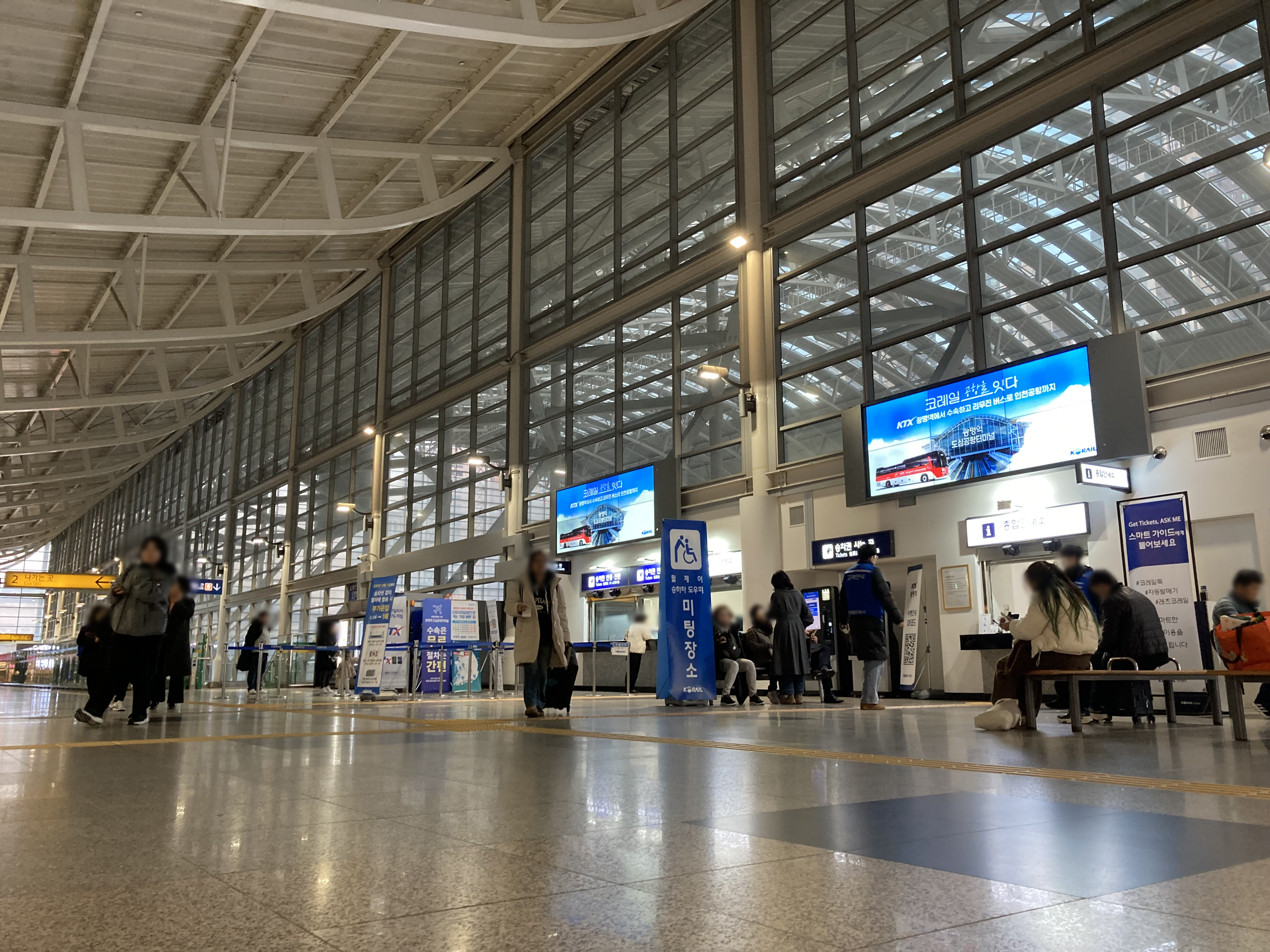
Inside the Gwangmyeong station

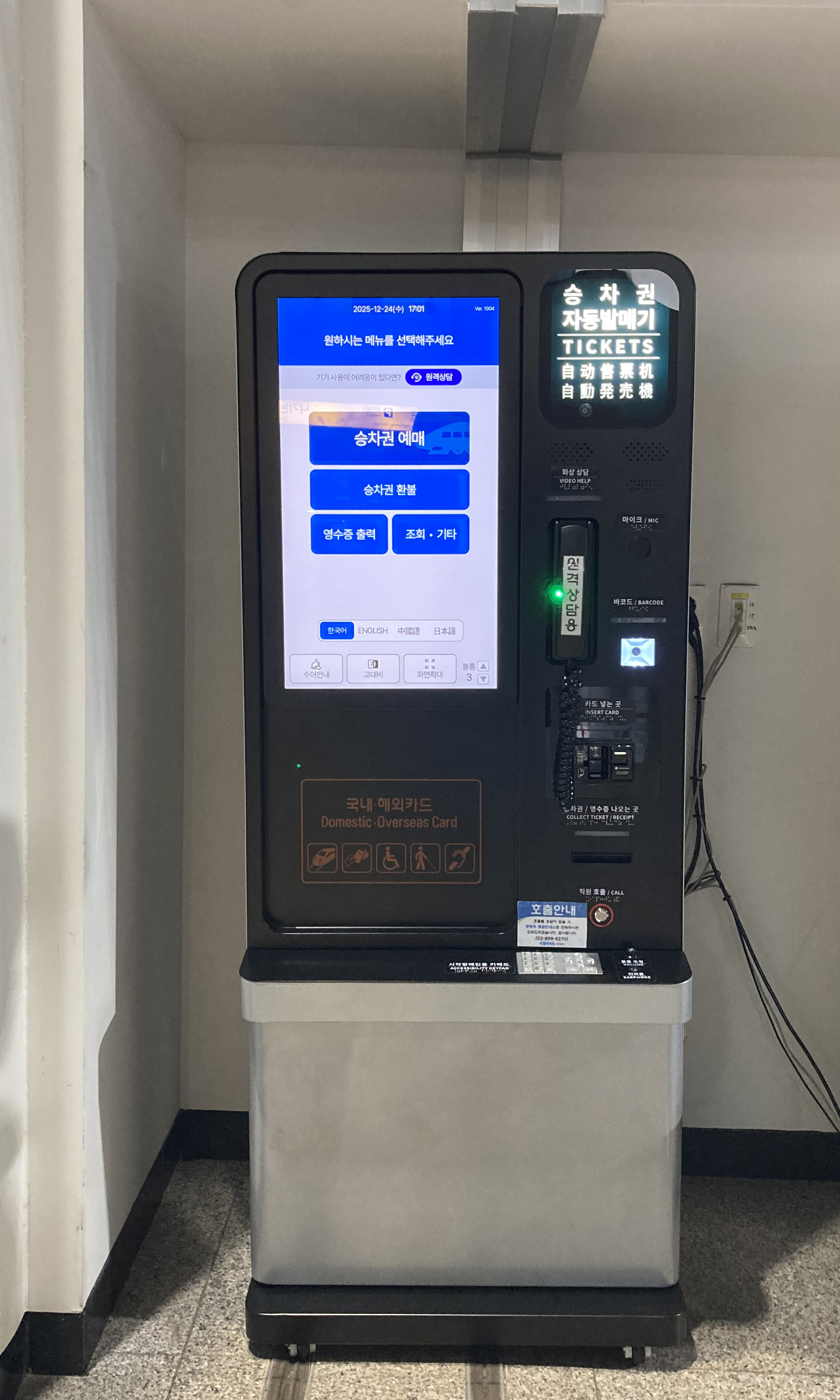
automatic ticket machine

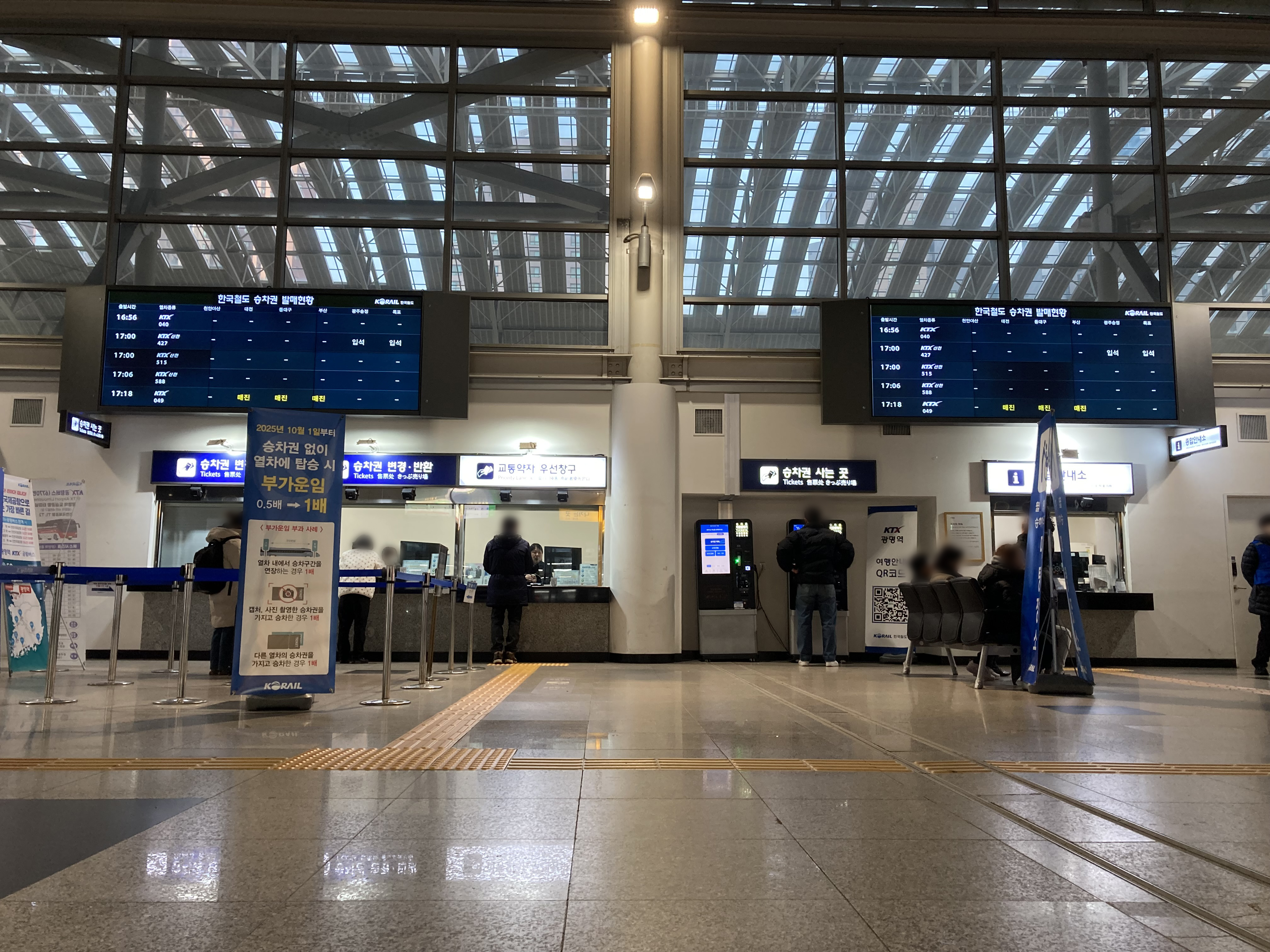
place of ticket purchase

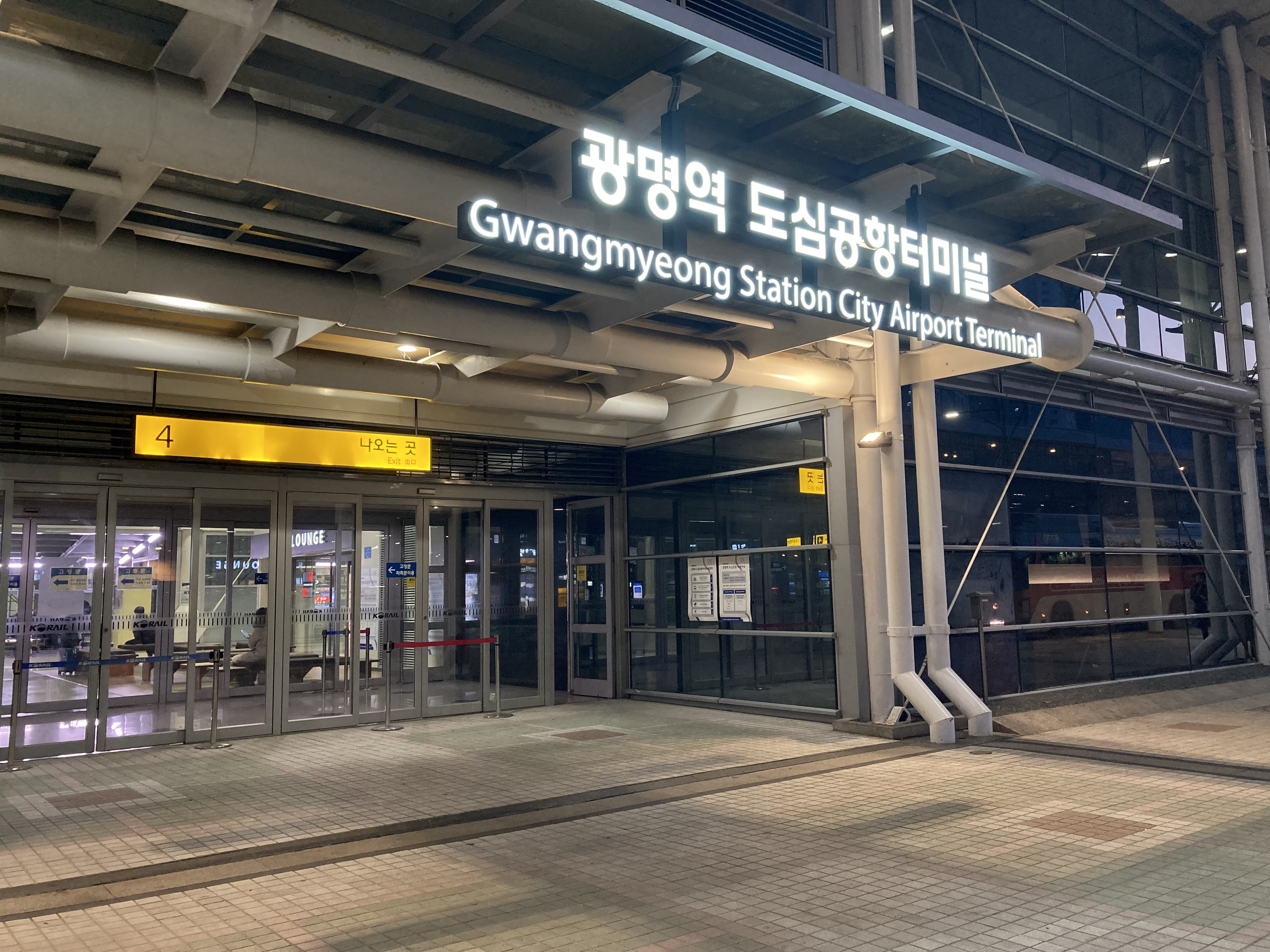
Gwangmyeong Station's downtown airport terminal and exit 4

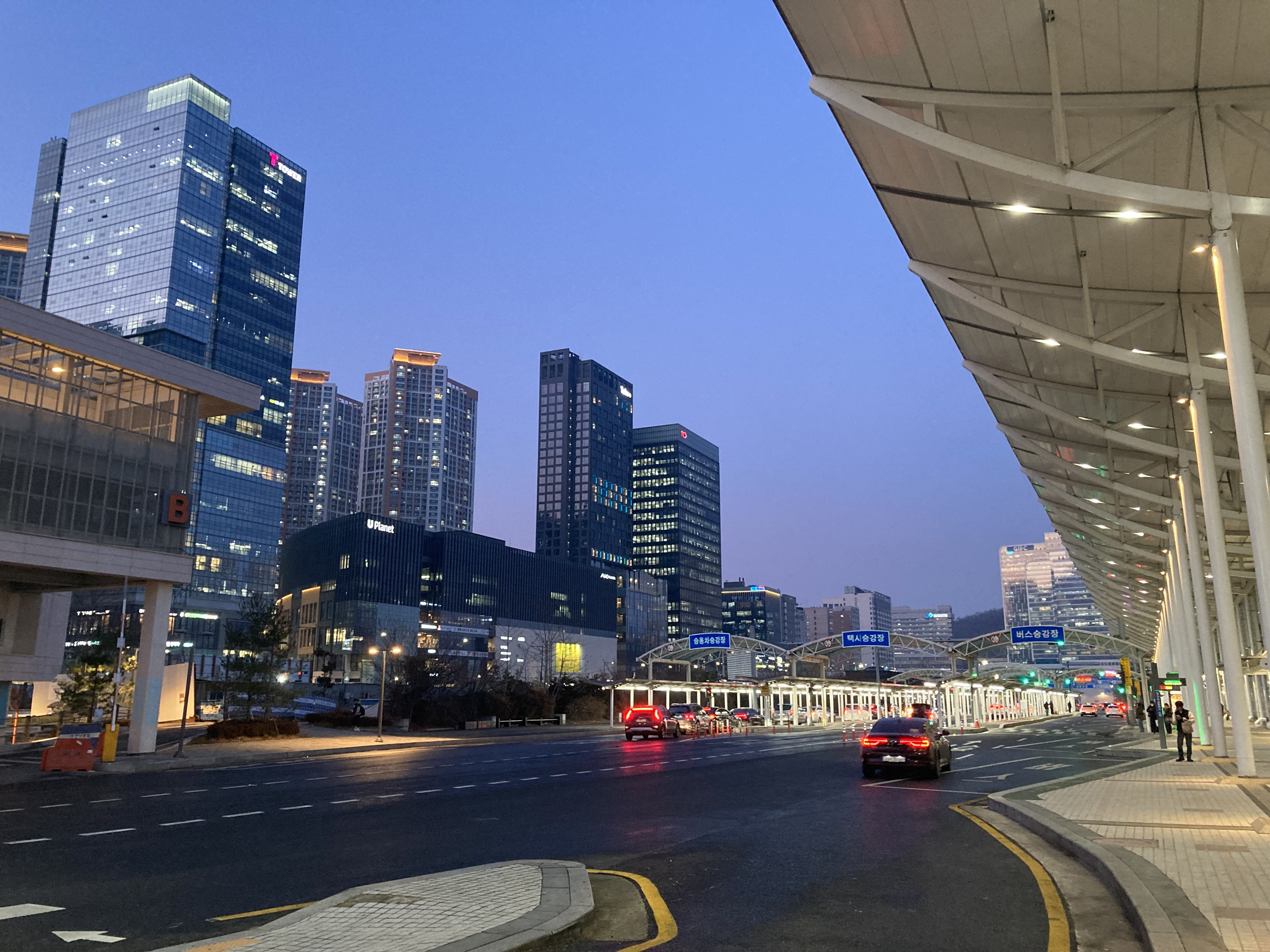
Night view and exit 4

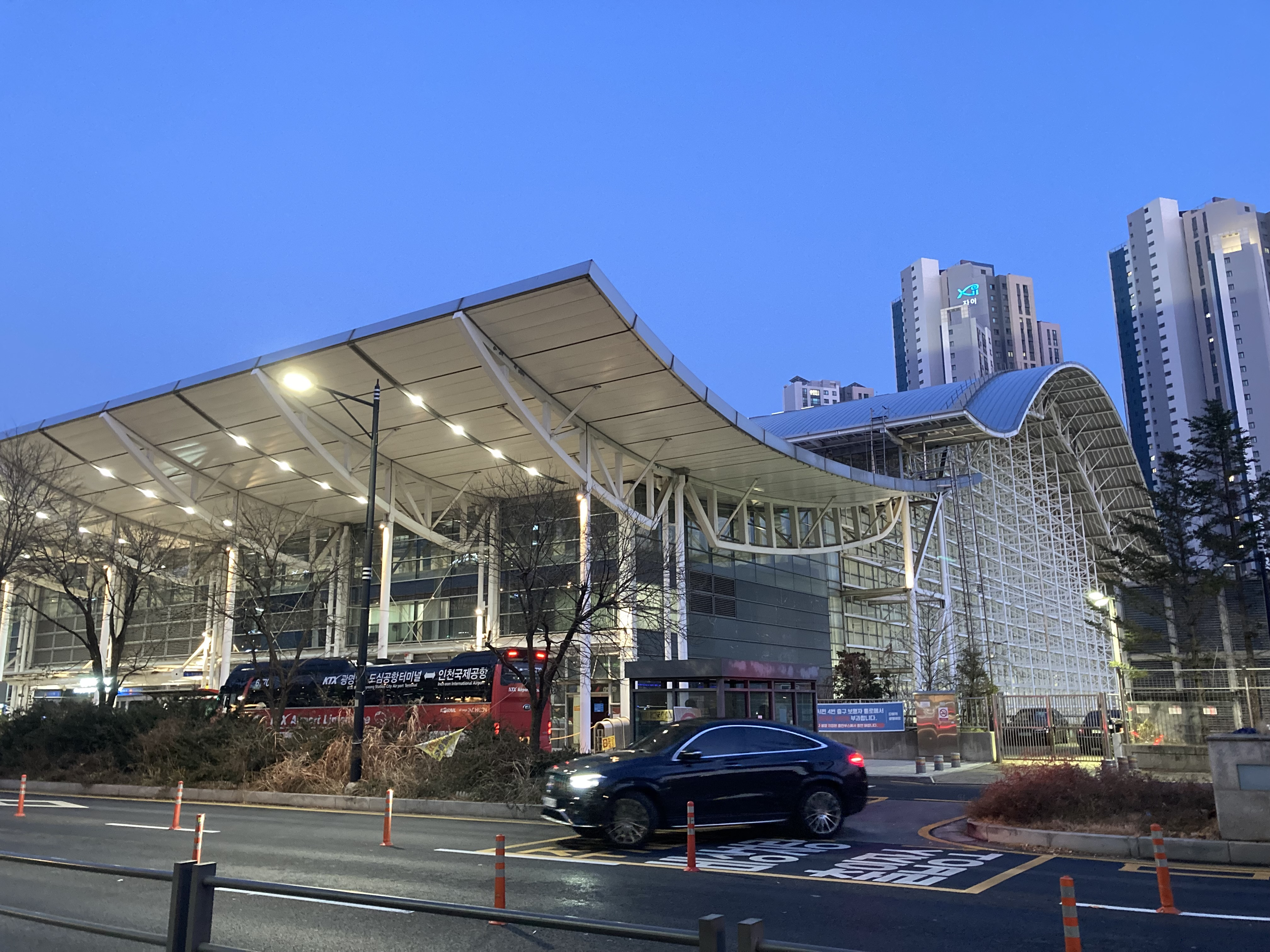
Night view and exit 4

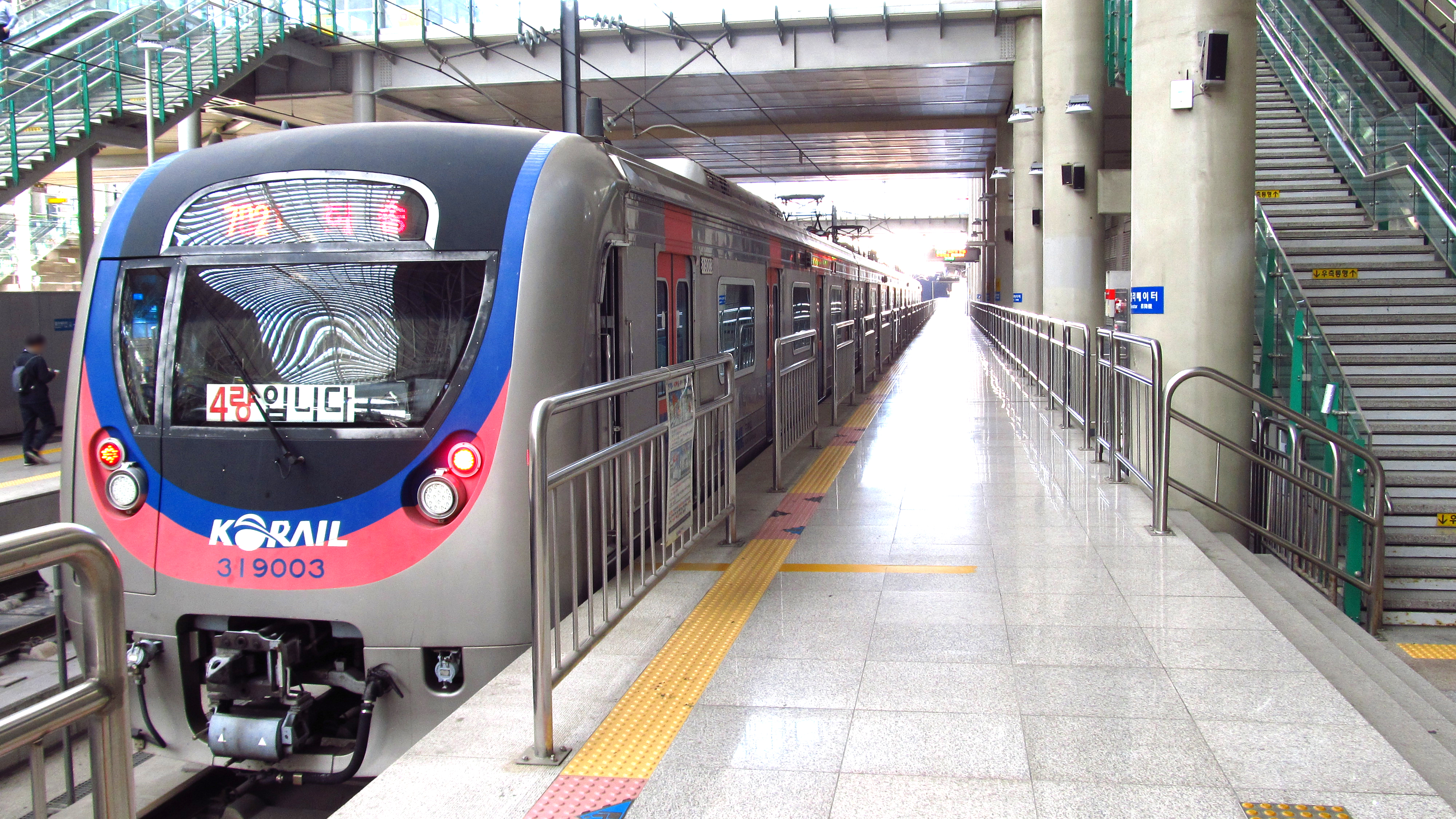
Station platform (Line 1)

== See also ==
- Transportation in South Korea
