= Onsu station =

Station on the Seoul Subway Line 1

Coordinates: 37.49203°N 126.82304°E

온수 (성공회대입구); Onsu (Sungkonghoe Univ.)
온수 (성공회대입구); Onsu (Sungkonghoe Univ.)
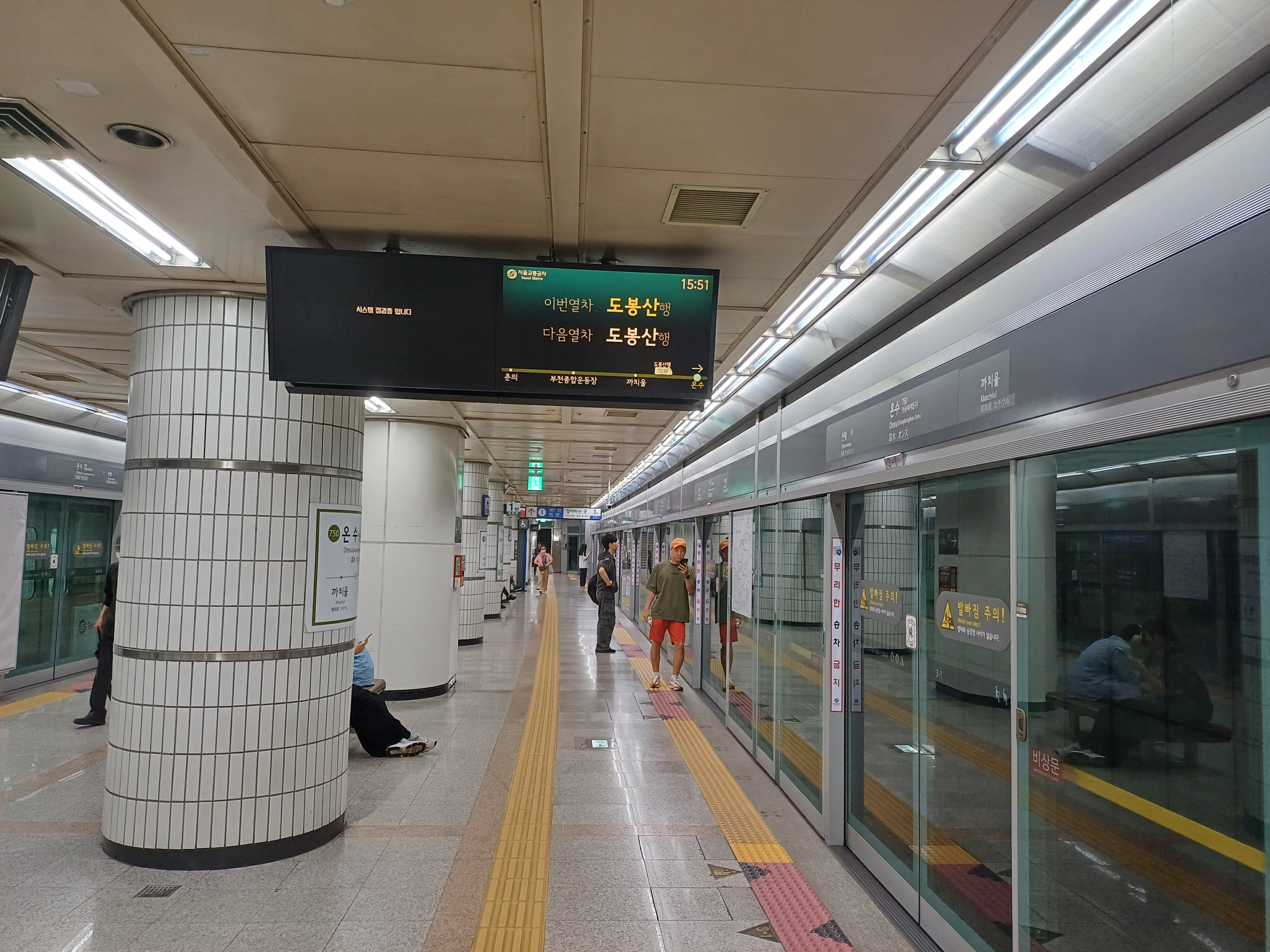
- Line 7 platforms

Korean name
- Hangul: 온수역
- Hanja: 溫水驛
- RR: Onsu-yeok
- MR: Onsu-yŏk

General information
- Location: 51-7 Onsu-dong, 872 Buillo, Guro-gu, Seoul
- Operator: Korail, Seoul Metro
- Lines: Line 1 Line 7
- Platforms: 4
- Tracks: 7

Key dates
- January 16, 1988: Line 1 opened
- February 29, 2000: Line 7 opened

Passengers
- (Daily) Based on Jan-Dec of 2012.. Line 1: 15,243; Line 7: 21,027

Services
Preceding station	Seoul Metropolitan Subway	Following station
Oryu-dong towards Yeoncheon	Line 1	Yeokgok towards Incheon
Oryu-dong towards Dongducheon	Line 1 Gyeongwon Express	Yeokgok towards Incheon
Cheonwang towards Jangam	Line 7	Kkachiul towards Seongnam
Location

Onsu Station (Korean: 온수역; Hanja: 溫水驛; RR: Onsu-yeok) is a station on the Seoul Subway Line 1. It was the former western terminus of Seoul Subway Line 7. A westward extension of Line 7 (from Onsu to Bupyeong-gu Office) was completed in October 2012. It is near the border of Seoul and Bucheon.

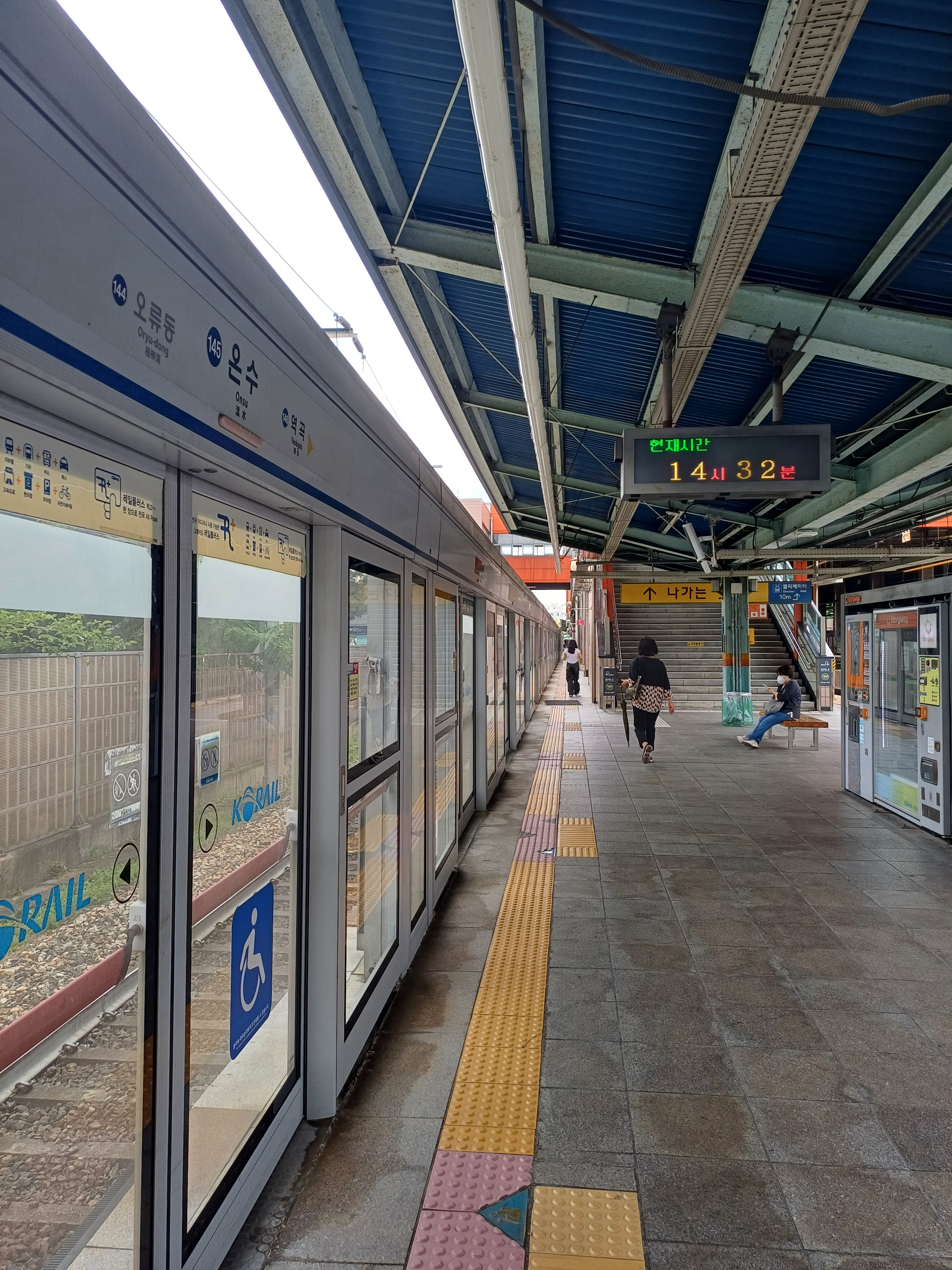
Line 1 platform

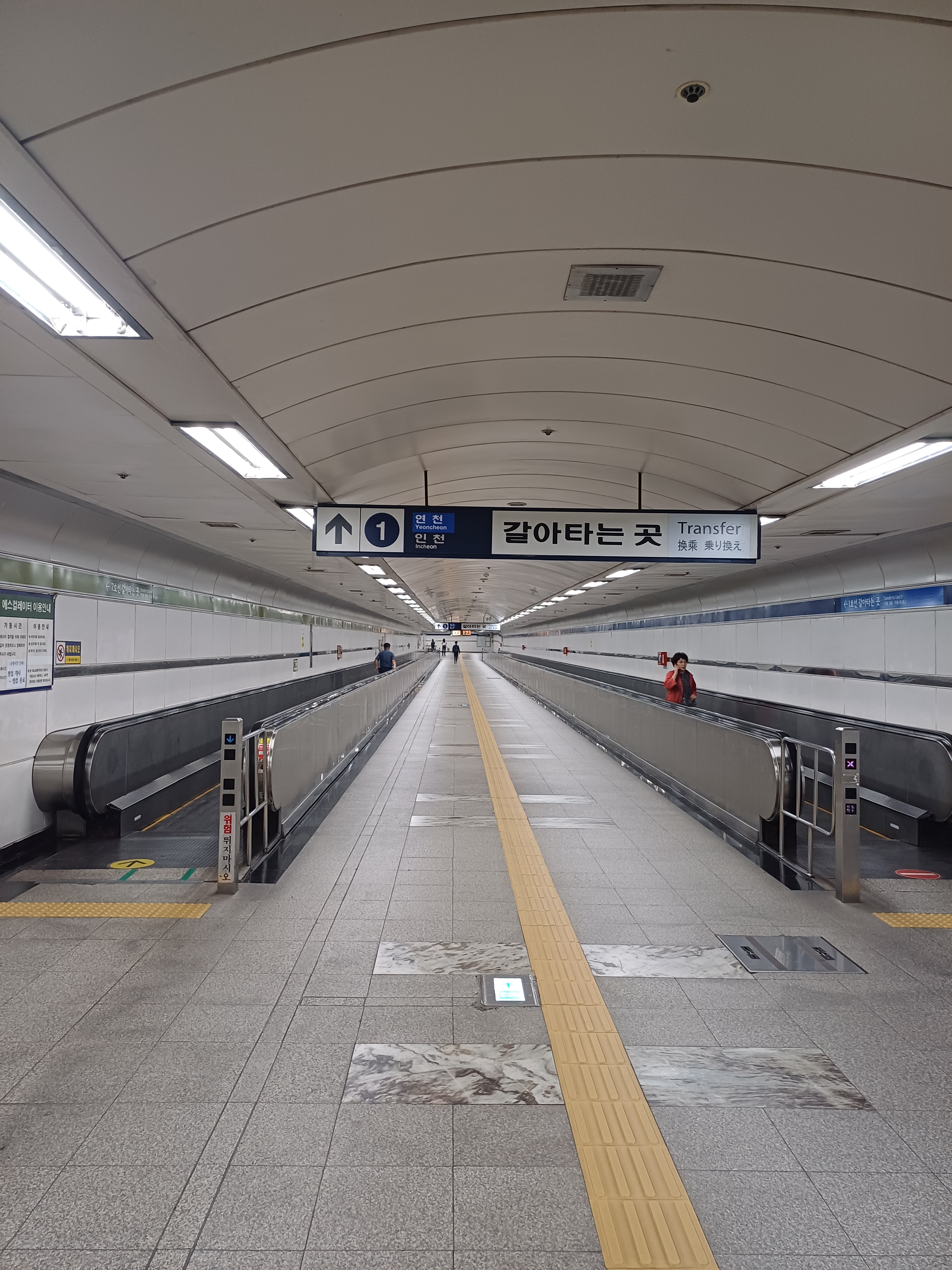
Moving walkway in the transfer corridor

== Station layout ==
=== Line 1 ===
↑ Oryu-dong
| 1 2 | | 3 4 |
Yeokgok ↓

1	● Line 1 toward Yeoncheon →
2	● Line 1 (Rapid) does not stop here →
3	← ● Line 1 (Rapid) does not stop here
4	← ● Line 1 toward Incheon

=== Line 7 ===
Cheonwang ↑
| 4, 3 | | 2, 1 |
↓ Kkachiul

4, 3	← ● Line 7 toward Seongnam (Platform 4) or terminates here (Platform 3)
2, 1	● Line 7 toward Jangam →

== Vicinity ==
- Exit 1: St. Peter's School
- Exit 2: Seoul Rugby Field
- Exit 3: Sungkonghoe University
- Exit 4: Yuhan College
- Exit 5: Onsu Industry Complex
- Exit 6: School of Performing Arts Seoul
- Exit 8: Onsu Elementary School, Wooshin Middle and High Schools
