= Gaebong station =

Train station in South Korea

Coordinates: 37.49448°N 126.85848°E

개봉; Gaebong
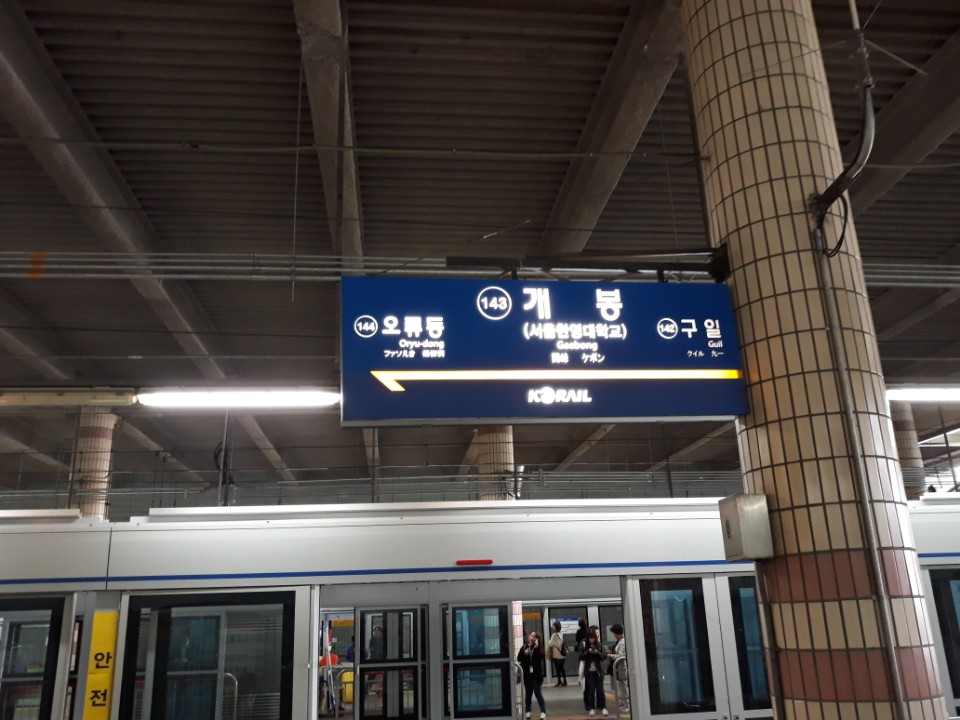
- Station Sign

Korean name
- Hangul: 개봉역
- Hanja: 開峰驛
- Revised Romanization: Gaebongnyeok
- McCune–Reischauer: Kaebongnyŏk

General information
- Location: 415 Gaebong-dong, 47 Gyeonginno 40 gil, Guro-gu, Seoul
- Operator: Korail
- Line: Gyeongin Line
- Platforms: 2
- Tracks: 4

Construction
- Structure type: Aboveground

History
- Opened: August 15, 1974

Passengers
- (Daily) Based on Jan-Dec of 2012. Line 1: 48,809

Services
Preceding station	Seoul Metropolitan Subway	Following station
Guil towards Yeoncheon	Line 1	Oryu-dong towards Incheon
Guil towards Dongducheon	Line 1 Gyeongwon Express	Oryu-dong towards Incheon
Guro towards Yongsan	Line 1 Gyeongin Express	Yeokgok towards Dongincheon
Location

Gaebong Station (Korean: 개봉역; Hanja: 開峰驛; RR: Gaebong-yeok) belongs to Seoul Subway Line 1.

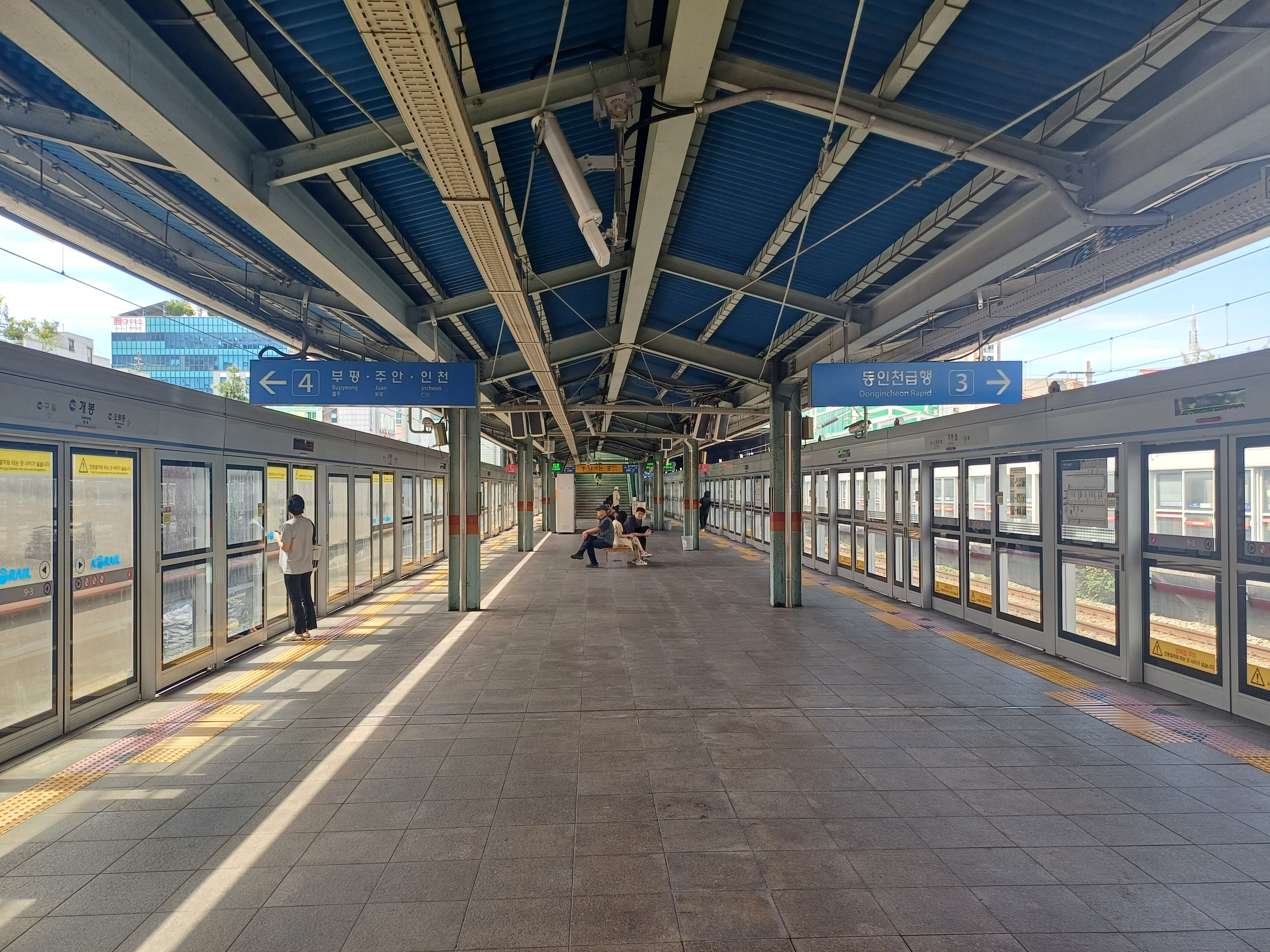
Station platform
