= Guil station =

Train station in South Korea

Coordinates: 37°29′46″N 126°52′11″E

구일 (동양미래대학); Guil (Dongyang Mirae Univ.)
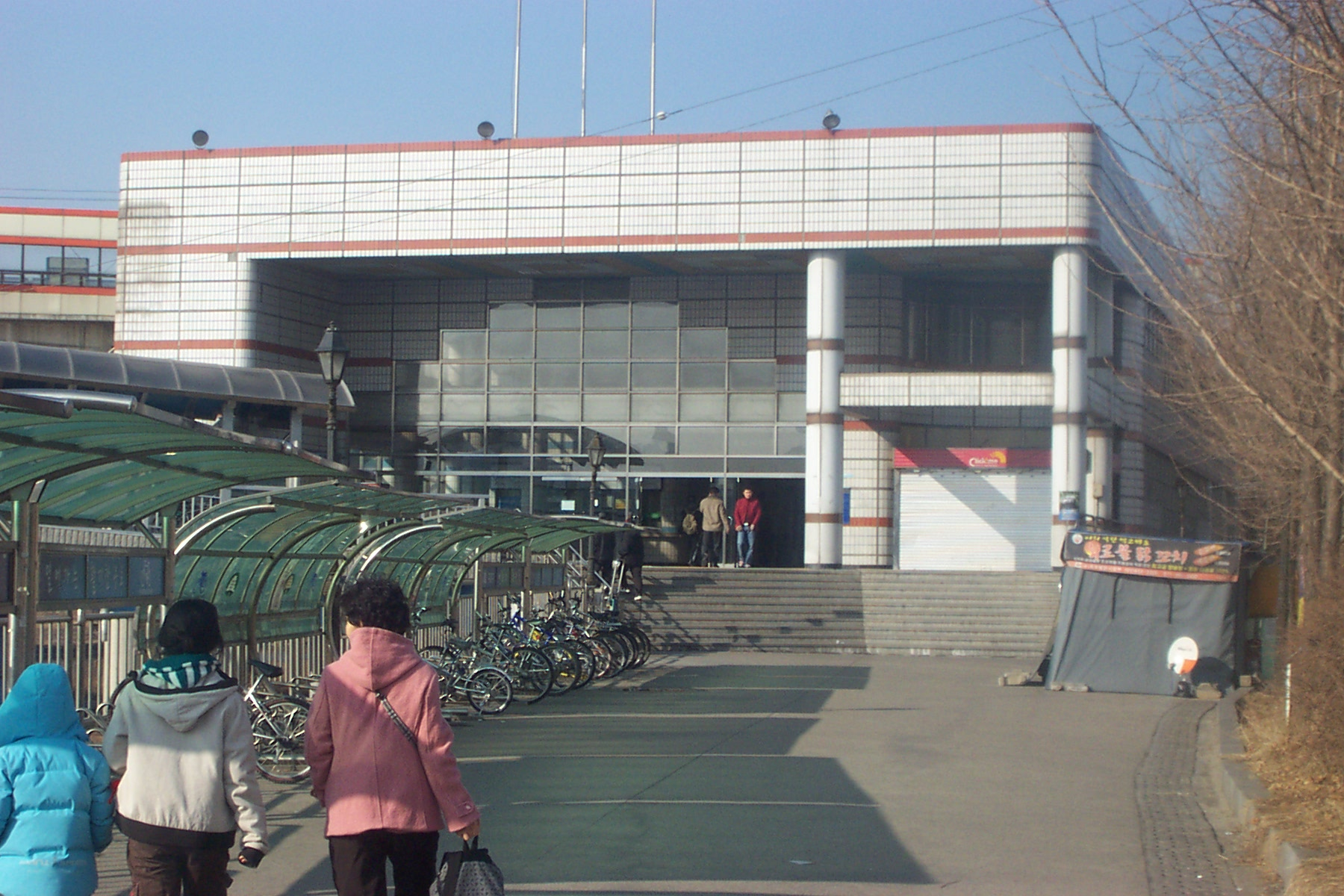
- Guil Station

Korean name
- Hangul: 구일역
- Hanja: 九一驛
- RR: Guil-yeok
- MR: Kuil-yŏk

General information
- Location: 133 Guillo, Guro-gu, Seoul
- Operator: Korail
- Line: Gyeongin Line
- Platforms: 3
- Tracks: 4

Construction
- Structure type: Aboveground

History
- Opened: February 16, 1995

Passengers
- (Daily) Based on Jan-Dec of 2012. Line 1: 12,276

Services
Preceding station	Seoul Metropolitan Subway	Following station
Guro towards Yeoncheon	Line 1	Gaebong towards Incheon
Guro towards Dongducheon	Line 1 Gyeongwon Express	Gaebong towards Incheon
Location

Guil Station (Korean: 구일역) is a subway station in Seoul, South Korea, that serves Seoul Subway Line 1. The name of this station comes from its location within Guro 1 (pronounced il)-dong. Dongyang Mirae University is located nearby.

== Vicinity ==
- Exit 1 : Guil Elementary, Middle, and High Schools
- Exit 2 (under construction): Guro Sungsim Hospital, Dongyang Mirae University, Guro Fire Station

== Near Subway Station ==
- Anyang stream
- Lotte Mart
