= Yeokgok station =

Metro station in Bucheon, South Korea

Coordinates: 37°29′6.42″N 126°48′41.71″E

역곡 (가톨릭대); Yeokgok (The Catholic Univ. of Korea)
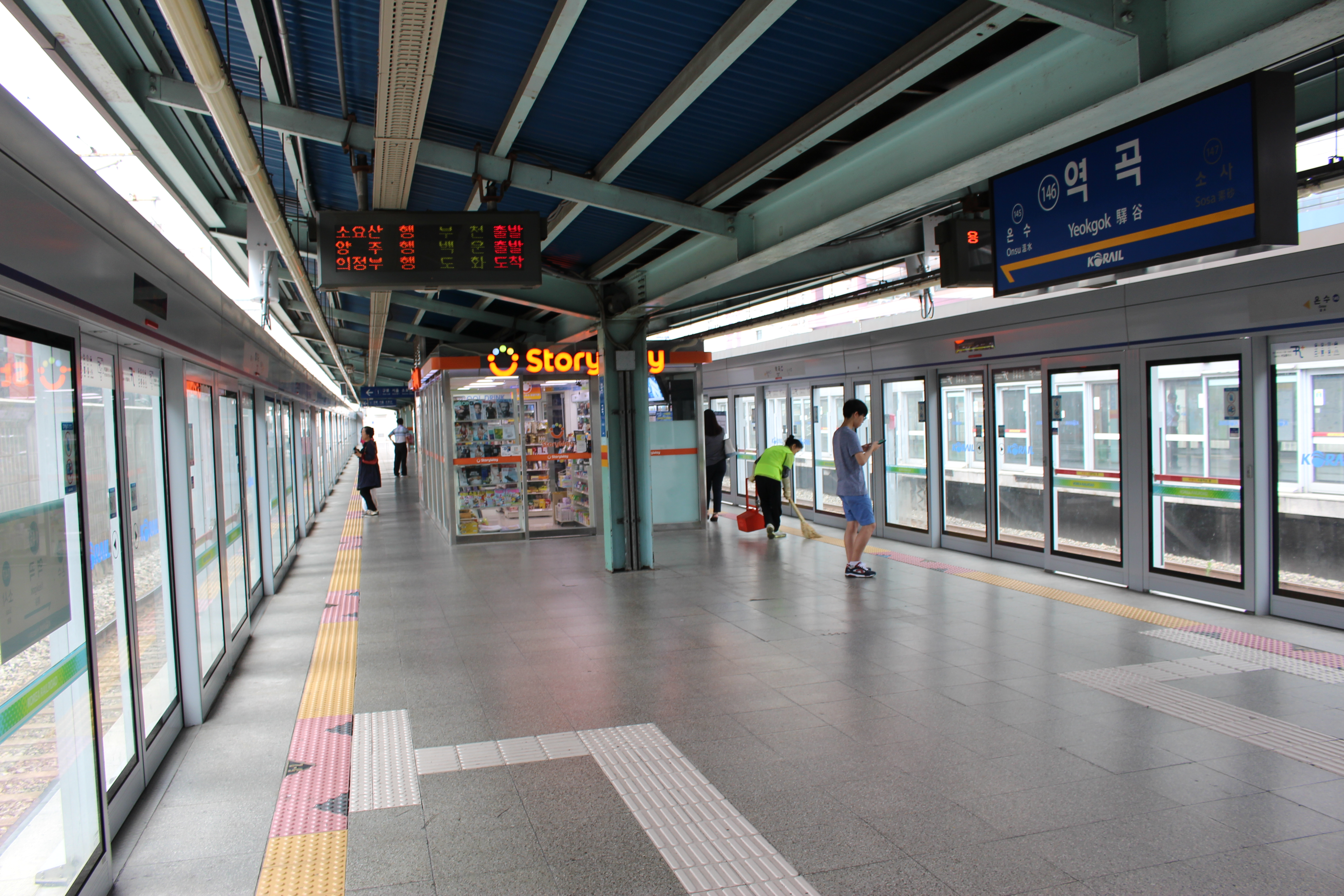
- Station Platforms

Korean name
- Hangul: 역곡역
- Hanja: 驛谷驛
- Revised Romanization: Yeokgok-yeok
- McCune–Reischauer: Yŏkkok-yŏk

General information
- Location: 230 Yeokgok-dong, 1 Yeokgongno, Wonmi-gu, Bucheon-si, Gyeonggi-do
- Operated by: Korail
- Line(s): Gyeongin Line
- Platforms: 2
- Tracks: 4

Construction
- Structure type: Aboveground

History
- Opened: May 1, 1967; August 15, 1974

Passengers
- (Daily) Based on Jan-Dec of 2012. Line 1: 66,386

Services
Preceding station	Seoul Metropolitan Subway	Following station
Onsu towards Soyosan	Line 1	Sosa towards Incheon
Onsu towards Dongducheon	Line 1 Gyeongwon Express	Sosa towards Incheon
Gaebong towards Yongsan	Line 1 Gyeongin Express	Bucheon towards Dongincheon

Yeokgok Station (Korean: 역곡역 (가톨릭대); Hanja: 驛谷驛; RR: Yeokgok-yeok) is a station on Seoul Subway Line 1 and the Gyeongin Line.

== Vicinity ==
- Exit 1 : Yeokgok Elementary & Middle Schools, Yeokgok Market.
- Exit 2 : Buan Elementary School, Homeplus, McDonald's, Starbucks, CJ CGV
