= Guro station =

Train station in South Korea

Coordinates: 37°30′11″N 126°52′56″E

구로; Guro
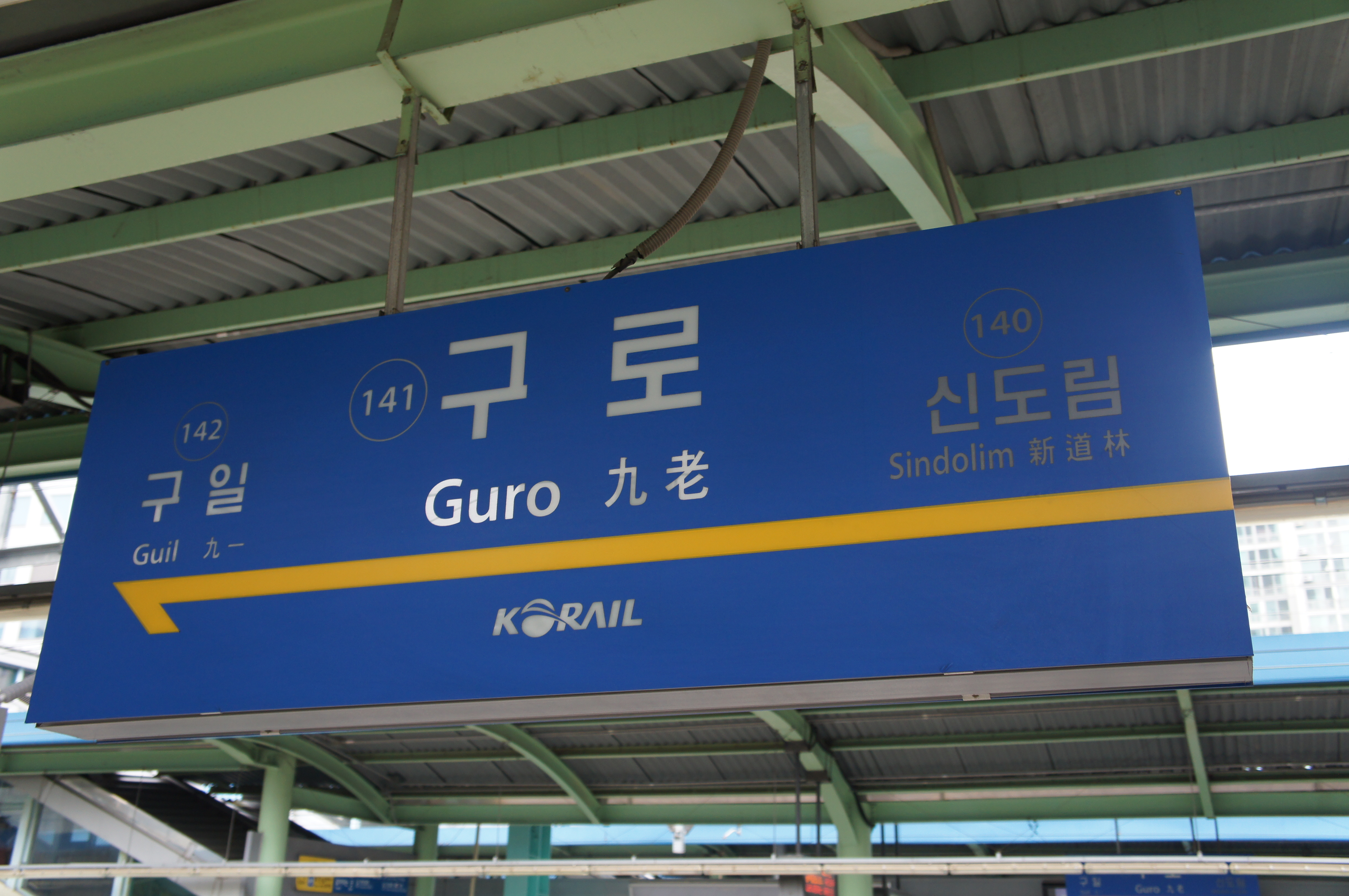
- Station nameplate (Gyeongin Line)

Korean name
- Hangul: 구로역
- Hanja: 九老驛
- RR: Guro-yeok
- MR: Kuro-yŏk

General information
- Location: 585-5 Guro 5-dong, 174 Gurojungangno, Guro-gu, Seoul)
- Operator: Korail
- Lines: Gyeongin Line; Gyeongbu Line
- Platforms: 5
- Tracks: 9

Construction
- Structure type: Aboveground

History
- Opened: December 1, 1973; August 15, 1974

Passengers
- (Daily) Based on Jan-Dec of 2012. Line 1: 48,352
Services
Preceding station	Seoul Metropolitan Subway	Following station
Sindorim towards Yeoncheon	Line 1	Guil towards Incheon
Sindorim towards Kwangwoon University	Line 1	Gasan Digital Complex towards Seodongtan or Sinchang
Sindorim towards Dongducheon	Line 1 Gyeongwon Express	Guil towards Incheon
Sindorim towards Yongsan	Line 1 Gyeongin Express	Gaebong towards Dongincheon
Sindorim towards Cheongnyangni	Line 1 Gyeongbu Express	Gasan Digital Complex towards Sinchang
Sindorim towards Yeongdeungpo	Line 1 Gwangmyeong Shuttle Service	Gasan Digital Complex towards Gwangmyeong
Location

Guro Station (Korean: 구로역) is a subway station in Guro District, Seoul, South Korea. It serves Seoul Subway Line 1.

The Gyeongin and Gyeongbu Lines separate at this station, with the former going west and the latter south. In addition, the Line 1 train service depot is located south of the station between Guro and Gasan Digital Complex Stations; several tracks diverge and lead to the depot.

All non-metro trains such as KTX, ITX-Saemaeul, Saemaeul-ho, Mugunghwa-ho, and Nuriro pass without stopping at Gyeongbu Line B (Seoul Station to Cheonan Express). Trains from Incheon Station and Shinchang Station and trains bound for Incheon and Shinchang are joined and diverted, with all trains on Line 1 in the Seoul metropolitan area except Gyeongbu Line B stopping, and some trains use the station as a city and destination.

== Vicinity ==
- Exit 1 : AK Plaza Guro Main Store
- Exit 2 : Sinmirim Elementary School

== Near Subway Station ==
- CGV cinema
- AK Plaza

== Gallery ==
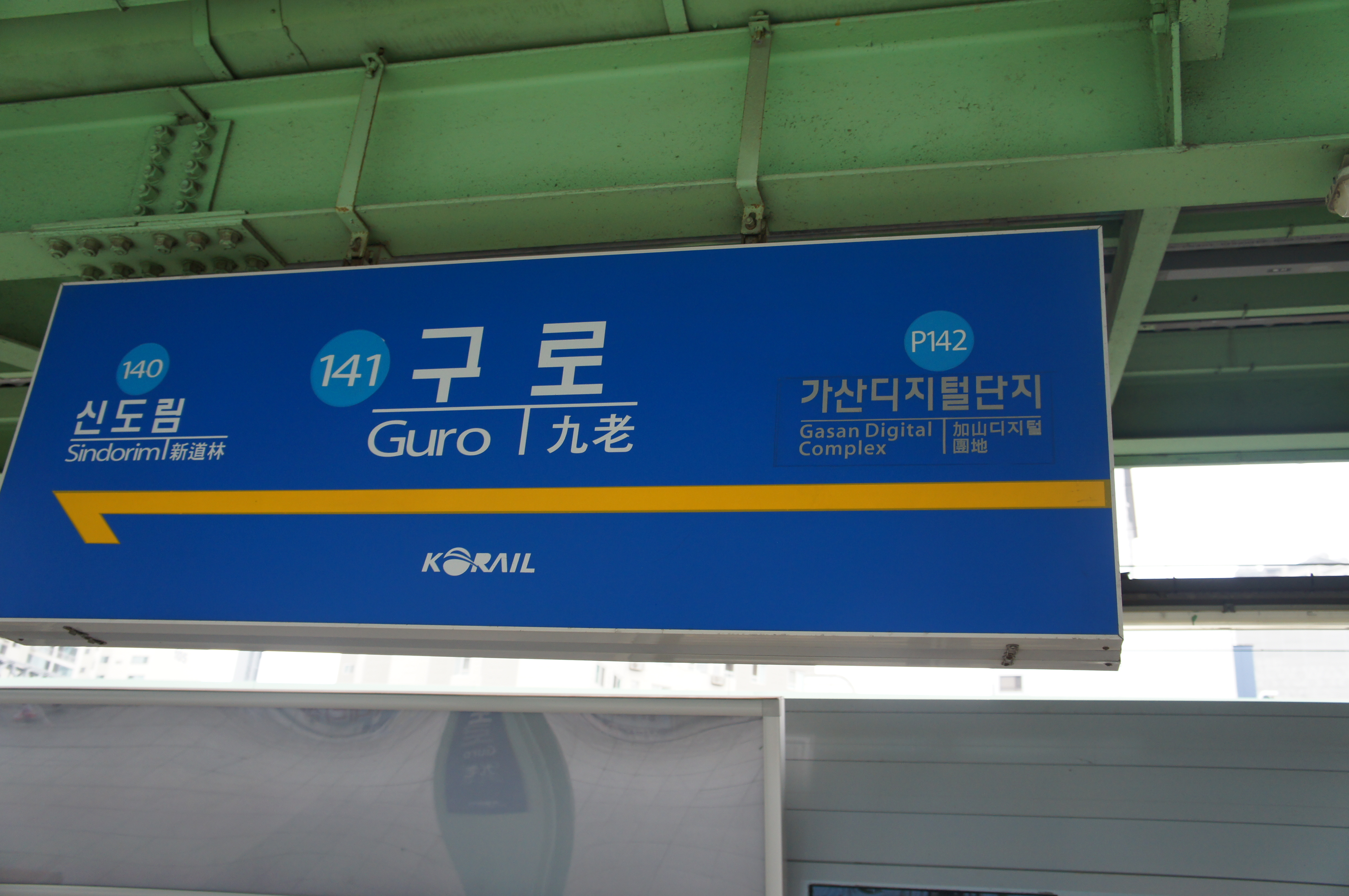
Station nameplate (Gyeongbu Line)
