= Gwangmyeong Cave =

Tourist attraction in Gyeonggi-do, South Korea

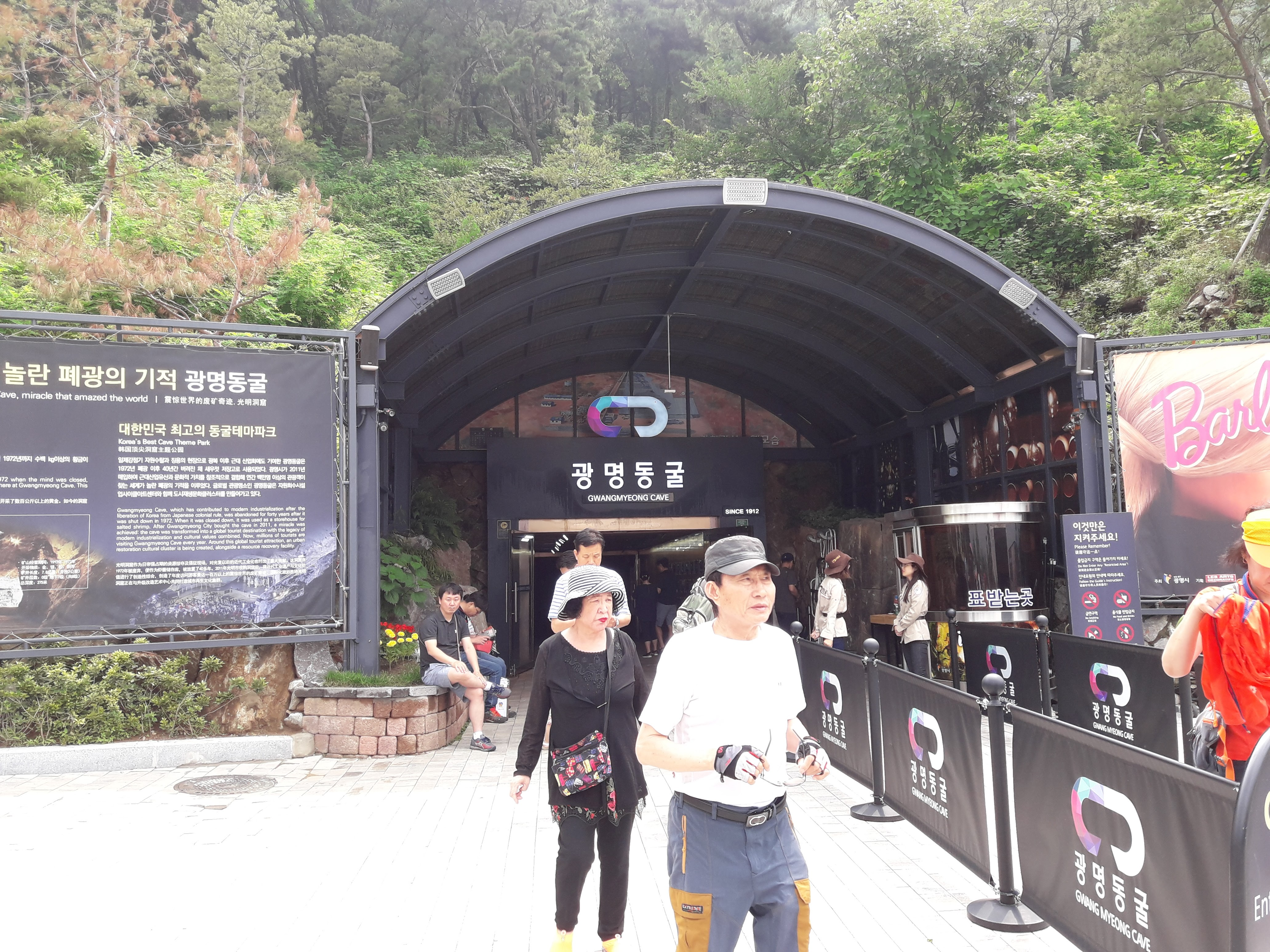
- Gwangmyeong Cave entrance
- Interactive map of Gwangmyeong Cave
- Coordinates: 37°26′N 126°52′E
- Depth: 275 m (902 ft)
- Length: 7.8 km (4.8 mi)
- Website: https://www.gm.go.kr/cv/en/index.do

Korean name
- Hangul: 광명동굴
- Hanja: 光明洞窟
- RR: Gwangmyeong donggul
- MR: Kwangmyŏng tonggul

Gwangmyeong Cave (Korean: 광명동굴) is a man-made cave in Gwangmyeong, Gyeonggi Province, South Korea. It is located on the far southwestern outskirts of Seoul. Since 2011, it has been open to the public as a tourist attraction, with amenities like a theme park, aquarium, and winery available inside. It is 7.8 kilometres (4.8 mi) long.

== History ==
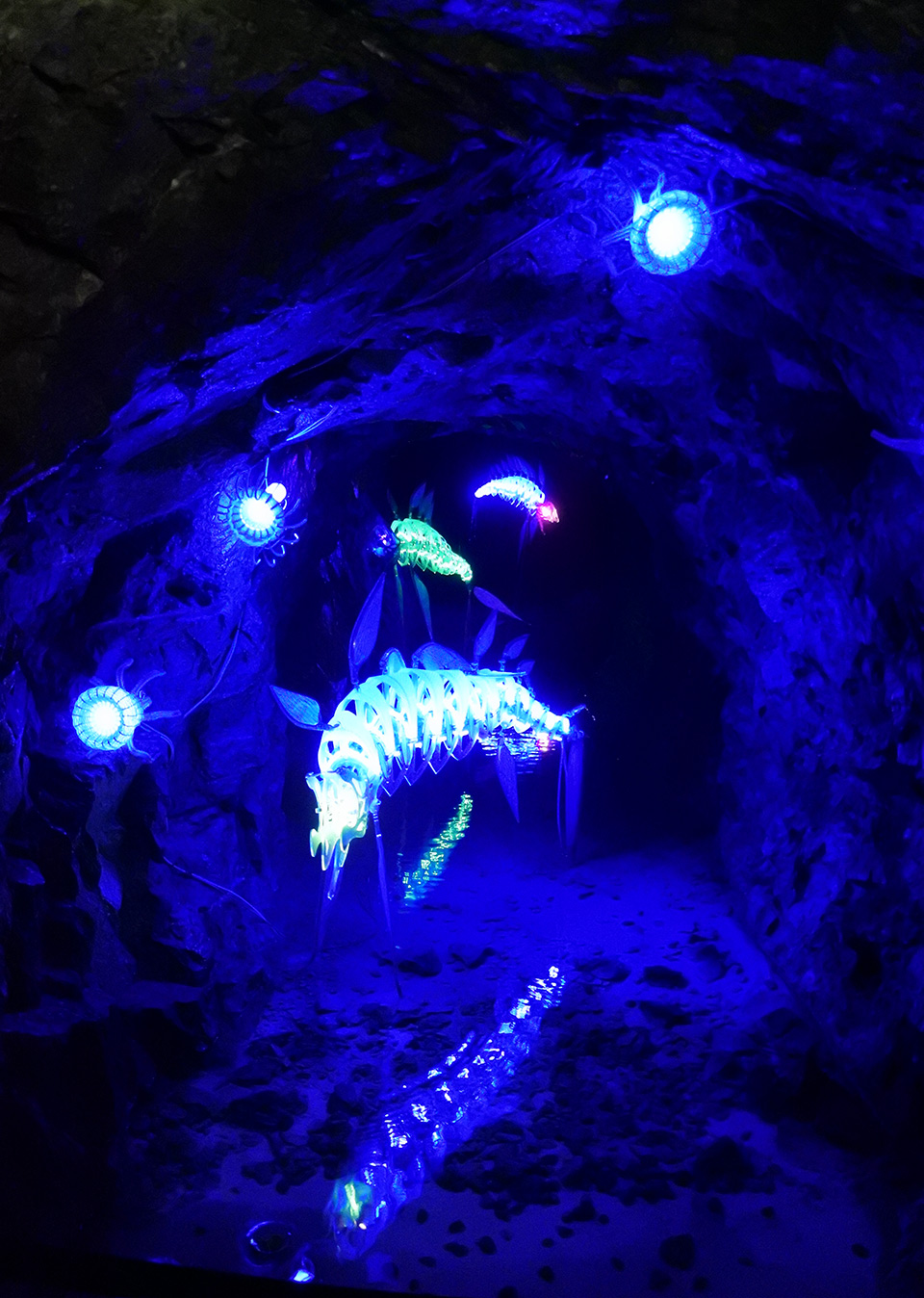
Fish Sculptures in the cave

The cave was created during the Japanese colonial period and was a site of forced labor. After the end of that period in 1945, it continued to be used as a mine until 1972. Eventually, due to floods and polluted rice paddies nearby, the mine was made to close.

It was used as a storage facility for salted shrimp (saeu-jeot) from 1978 to 2010. Then, the Gwangmyeong city government purchased the land and made it into a theme park.

The cave complex re-opened in 2011. It now has historical exhibits, but is chiefly entertainment-focused, with aquariums, sculptures, light shows, children's amusements, and other attractions, including an underground winery.

The cave complex is popular, especially for its cooler underground temperatures in summer.
