= Cheonwang station =

Metro station in Seoul, South Korea

천왕; Cheonwang
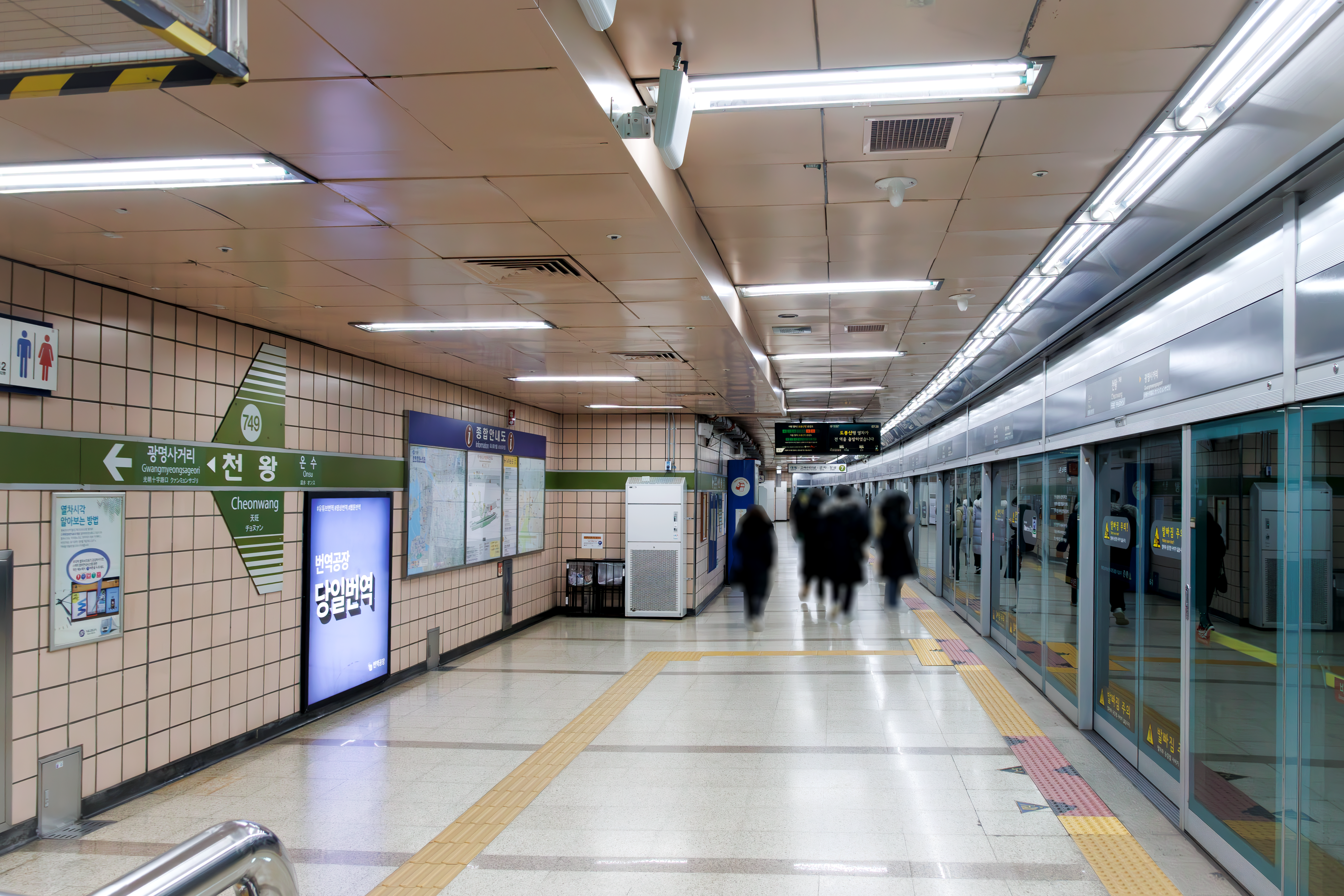
- Station platform

Korean name
- Hangul: 천왕역
- Hanja: 天旺驛
- Revised Romanization: Cheonwangnyeok
- McCune–Reischauer: Ch'ŏnwangnyŏk

General information
- Location: 174-5 Oryu-dong, 1154 Oriro Jiha, Guro-gu, Seoul
- Coordinates: 37°29′12″N 126°50′19″E
- Operator: Seoul Metro
- Line: Line 7
- Platforms: 2
- Tracks: 2

Construction
- Structure type: Underground

Key dates
- February 29, 2000: Line 7 opened
Location

Cheonwang Station (Korean: 천왕역) is a subway station on the Seoul Subway Line 7. Line 7 trains are serviced at Gwangmyeong Train Depot, located between Onsu Station and the preceding Gwangmyeongsageori Station.

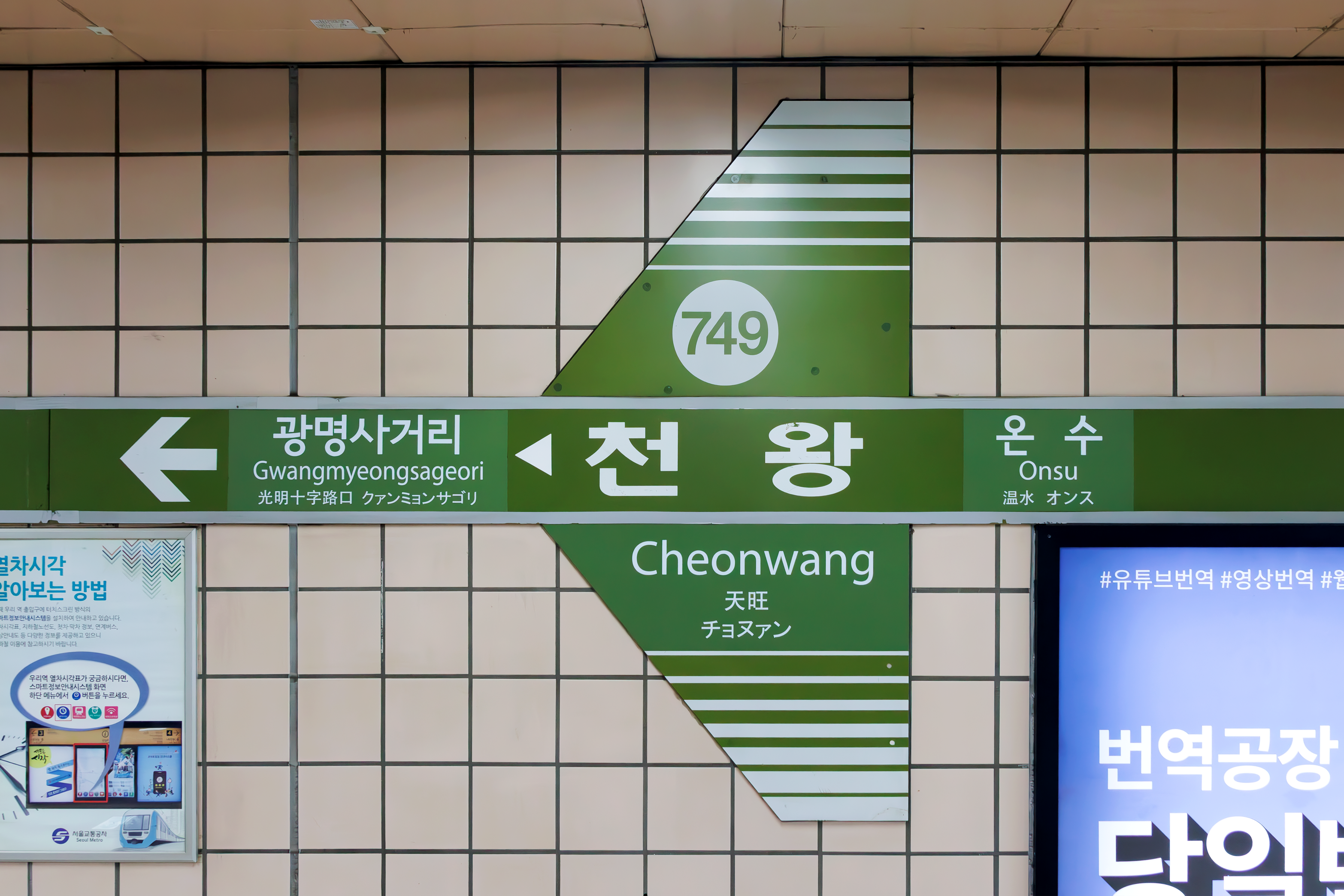
Station nameplate

== Station layout ==
Gwangmyeongsageori ↑
S/B | | N/B
↓ Onsu

Southbound	← ● Line 7 toward Seongnam
Northbound	● Line 7 toward Jangam →

== Vicinity ==
- Exit 1 : Oryu-dong, Kodit Membership Training Centre, Ippenhaus Apartment Complex
- Exit 2 : Oryu 2-dong Security Serive Centre
- Exit 3 : Oryu 2-dong, Gae-yoong Mountain

== Connection ==
There are 4 bus lines through this station.

- Seoul bus 6640 (Green)
- Public light bus Guro04 / Guro14 / Guro 15

Preceding station	Seoul Metropolitan Subway	Following station
Gwangmyeongsageori towards Jangam	Line 7	Onsu towards Seongnam
