= Gwangmyeongsageori station =

Train station in South Korea

광명사거리; Gwangmyeongsageori
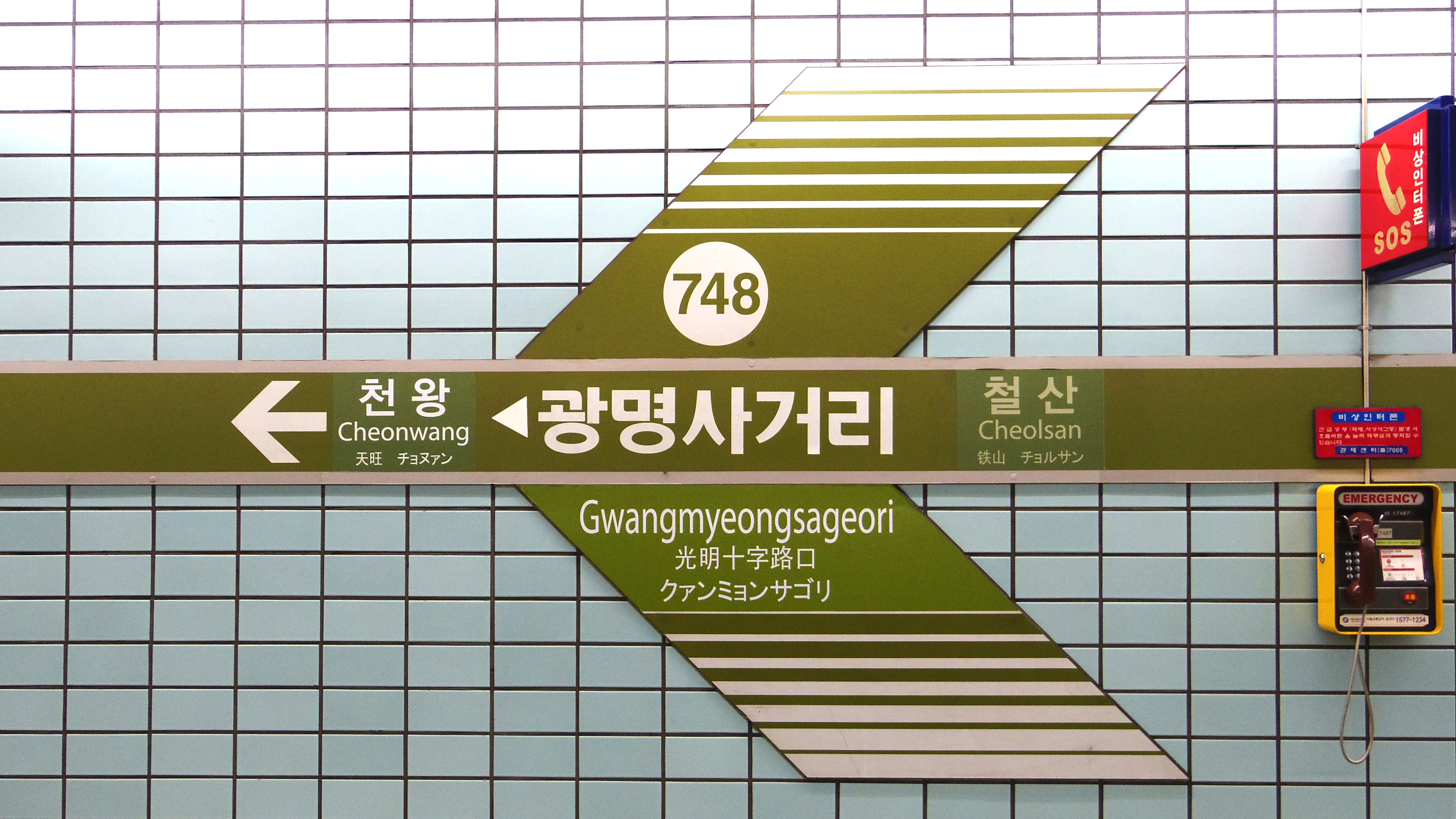

Korean name
- Hangul: 광명사거리역
- Hanja: 光明사거리驛
- Revised Romanization: Gwangmyeongsageori-yeok
- McCune–Reischauer: Kwangmyŏngsagŏri-yŏk

General information
- Location: 158-211 Gwangmyeong-dong, 980 Oriro Jiha, Gwangmyeong-si, Gyeonggi-do
- Coordinates: 37°28′45″N 126°51′17″E
- Operated by: Seoul Metro
- Line(s): Line 7
- Platforms: 2
- Tracks: 3

Construction
- Structure type: Underground

History
- Previous names: Gwangmyeong

Key dates
- February 29, 2000: Line 7 opened
- April 1, 2004: Renamed from Gwangmyeong to Gwangmyeongsageori

Services
Preceding station	Seoul Metropolitan Subway	Following station
Cheolsan towards Jangam	Line 7	Cheonwang towards Seongnam

Gwangmyeongsageori Station (Korean: 광명사거리역) is a station on Line 7 of the Seoul Subway, even though the station itself is located in the heart of the neighboring city of Gwangmyeong. Its name was changed from Gwangmyeong Station when the KTX Gwangmyeong Station was opened in 2004.

== Station layout ==
Cheolsan ↑
S/B | N/B |
↓ Cheonwang

Southbound	← ● Line 7 toward Seongnam
Northbound	● Line 7 toward Jangam →

== Vicinity ==
- Exit 3: Gwangmyeongnam Elementary School
- Exit 4: Hanjin Town APT
- Exit 5: Gwangmyeongseo Elementary School
- Exit 6: Kaemyong Elementary School
- Exit 8: Gwangmyeong Elementary School
- Exit 9: Gwangmyeong CGV
