= Oryu-dong station =

Train station in South Korea

Coordinates: 37.49449°N 126.845334°E

오류동; Oryu-dong
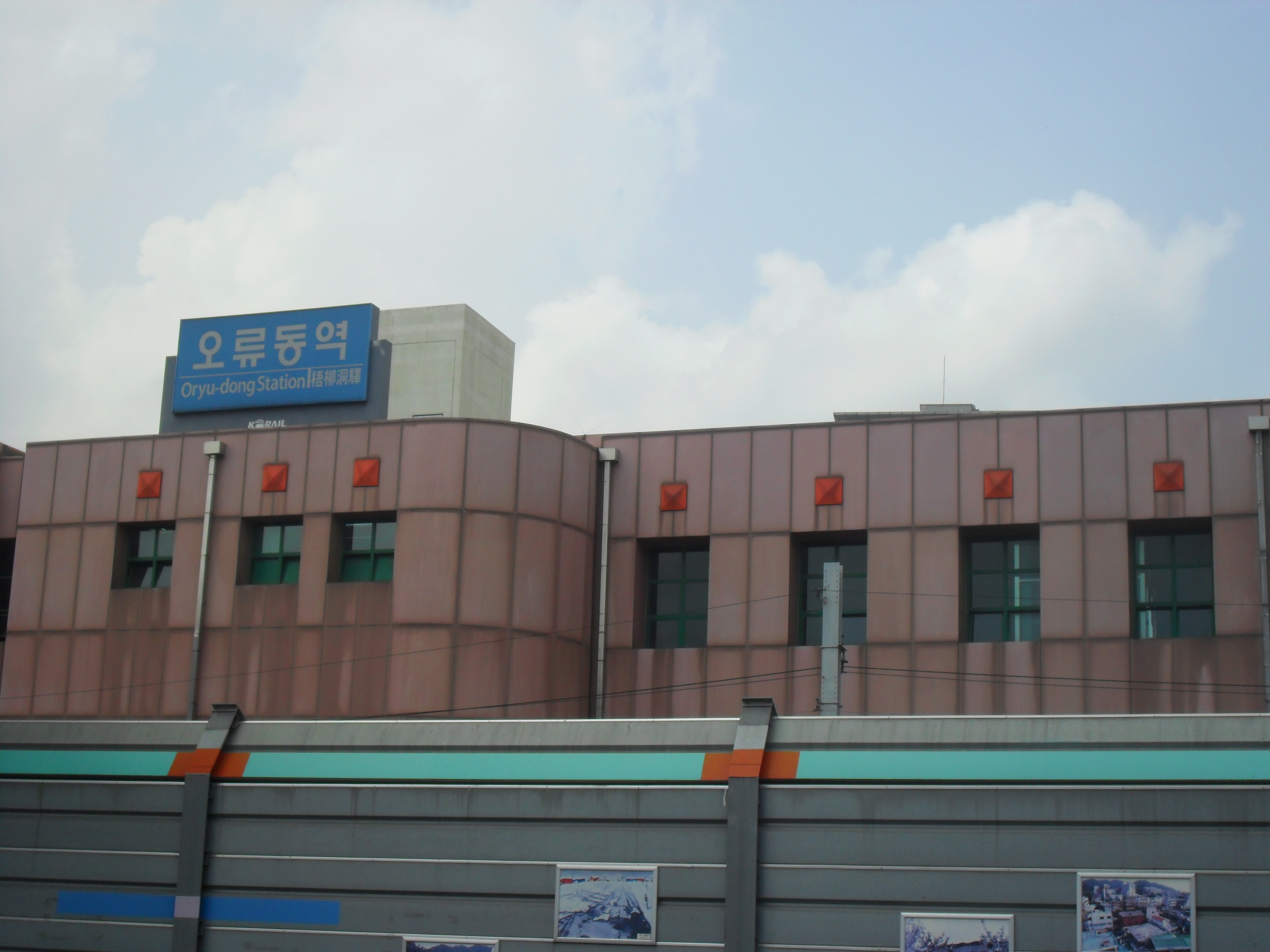

Korean name
- Hangul: 오류동역
- Hanja: 梧柳洞驛
- Revised Romanization: Oryudong-yeok
- McCune–Reischauer: Oryudong-yŏk

General information
- Location: 66 Oryu 2-dong, 13 Gyeonginno 20 gil, Guro-gu, Seoul
- Operated by: Korail
- Line(s): Gyeongin Line
- Platforms: 2
- Tracks: 4

Construction
- Structure type: Aboveground

History
- Opened: September 18, 1899; August 15, 1974

Passengers
- (Daily) Based on Jan-Dec of 2012. Line 1: 22,833

Services
Preceding station	Seoul Metropolitan Subway	Following station
Gaebong towards Soyosan	Line 1	Onsu towards Incheon
Gaebong towards Dongducheon	Line 1 Gyeongwon Express	Onsu towards Incheon

Oryu-dong station (Korean: 오류동역; Hanja: 梧柳洞驛; RR: Oryudong-yeok) is a metro station on Line 1 of the Seoul Subway. It was opened when the Seoul–Incheon line was first introduced during the Japanese occupation era.
