= Cheolsan station =

Metro station in Seoul, South Korea

철산; Cheolsan
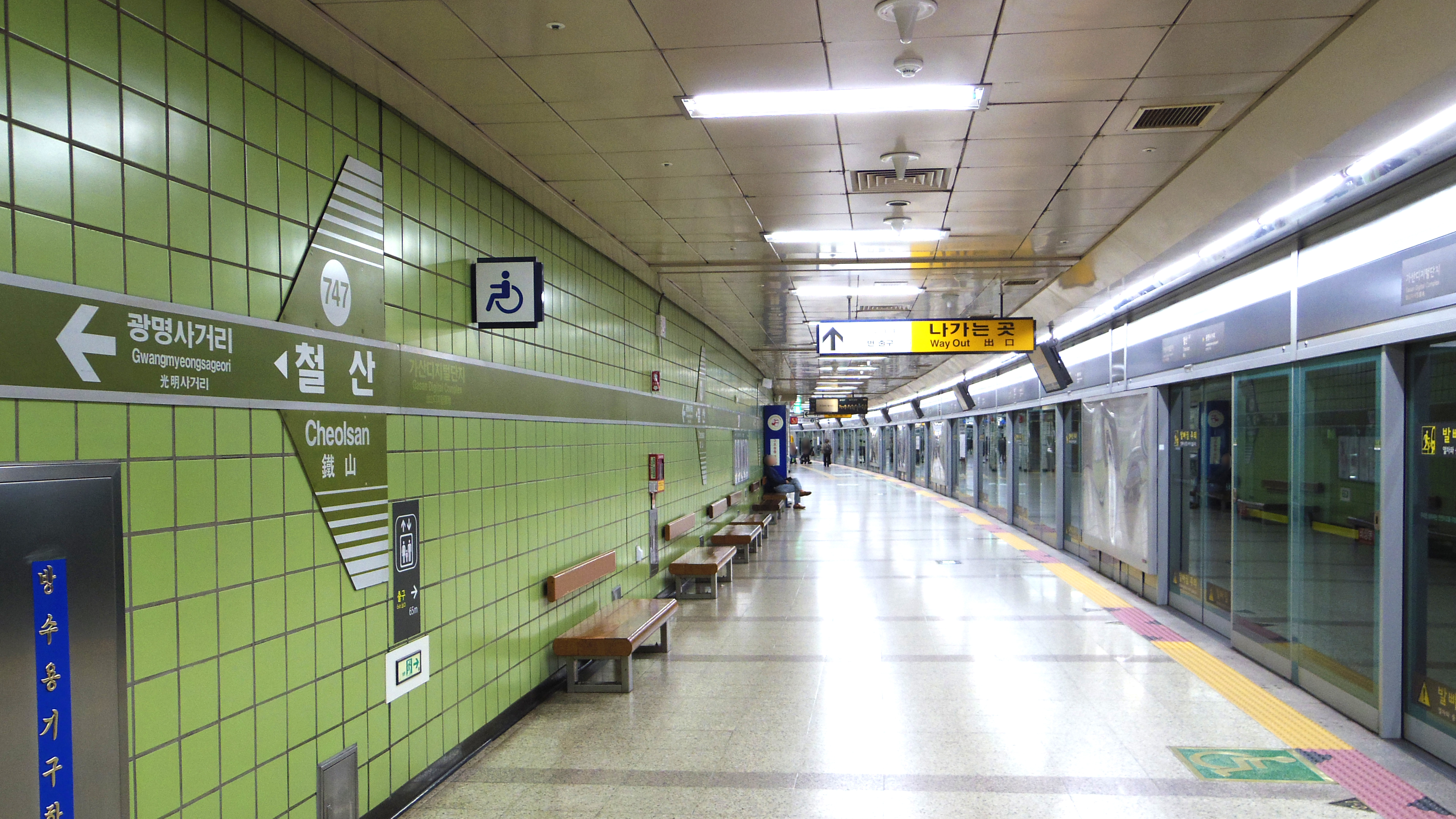

Korean name
- Hangul: 철산역
- Hanja: 鐵山驛
- Revised Romanization: Cheolsannyeok
- McCune–Reischauer: Ch'ŏlsannyŏk

General information
- Location: 526 Cheolsan-dong, 13 Cheolsanno Jiha, Gwangmyeong-si, Gyeonggi-do
- Coordinates: 37°28′34″N 126°52′05″E
- Operated by: Seoul Metro
- Line(s): Line 7
- Platforms: 2
- Tracks: 2

Construction
- Structure type: Underground

Key dates
- February 29, 2000: Line 7 opened

Cheolsan Station (pronounced [tʃʌl.sɑːn]) (Korean: 철산역) is a station on the Seoul Subway Line 7. It is one of the three metro stations in the suburban city of Gwangmyeong.

== Station layout ==
Gasan Digital Complex ↑
| N/B
↓ Gwangmyeongsageori

Southbound	← ● Line 7 toward Seongnam
Northbound	● Line 7 toward Jangam →

== Vicinity ==
- Exit 1 : Wangjaesan Park, Cheolsan Market
- Exit 2 : Gwangmyeong Police Station, Gwangdeok Elementary School
- Exit 3 : Gwangmyeong Middle & High Schools, Gwangmyeong City Hall, Gwangmyeong Court Building
- Exit 4 : Gwangseong Elementary School

Preceding station	Seoul Metropolitan Subway	Following station
Gasan Digital Complex towards Jangam	Line 7	Gwangmyeongsageori towards Seongnam
