= Tomb of Princess Jeongseon =

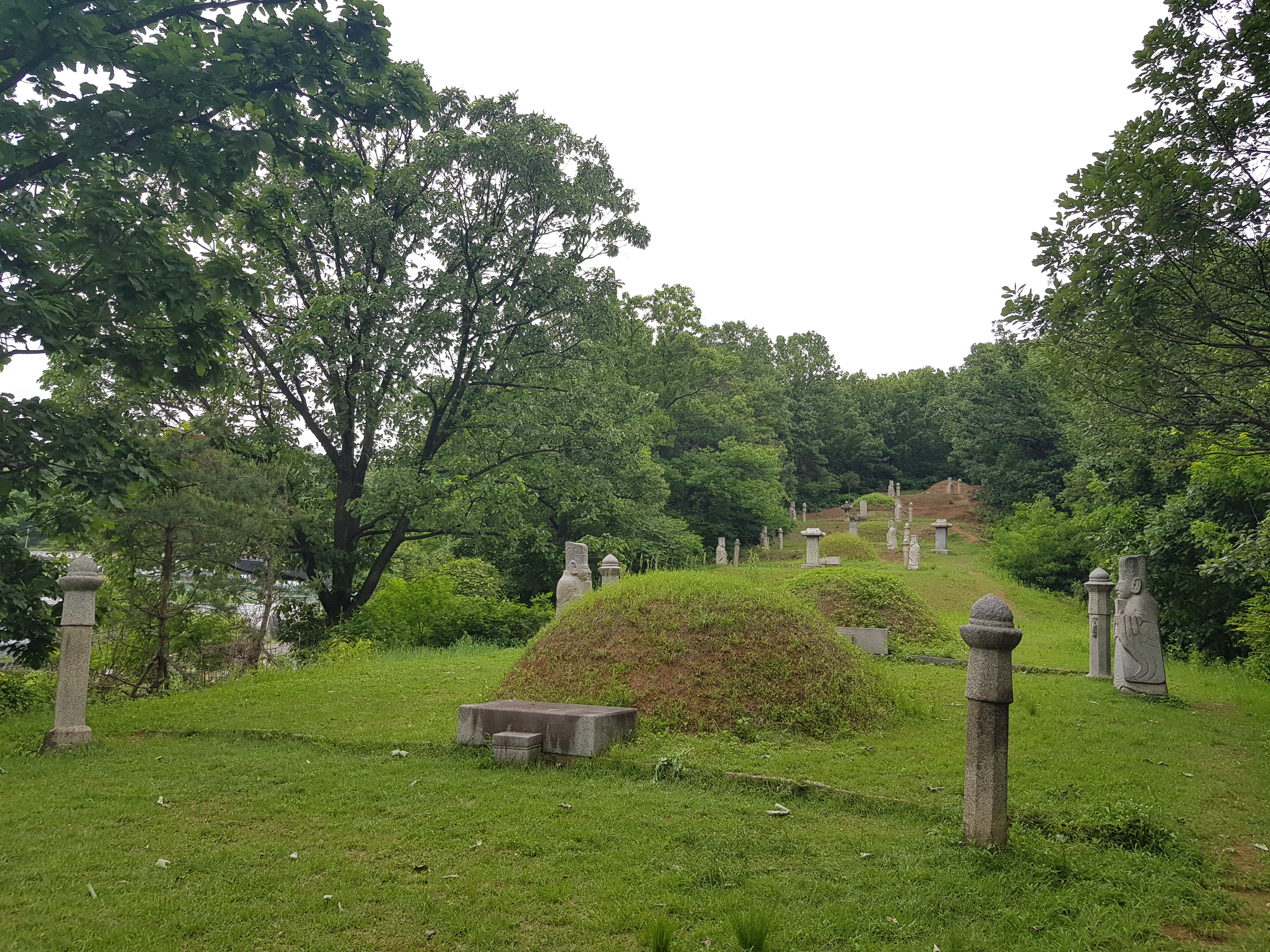
- Location: Guro and Seoul, South Korea

History
- Built: Joseon Dynasty

- Tomb of Princess Jeongseon
- Hangul: 정선옹주묘역
- Hanja: 貞善翁主墓域
- Revised Romanization: Jeongseon ongju myoyeok
- McCune–Reischauer: Chŏngsŏn ongju myoyŏk

The Tomb of Princess Jeongseon is the burial area of the Andong Gwon clan. It is located at the north side of Guro Girls' Information Industry High School in Gung-dong, Guro, Seoul.

Princess Jeongseon(1594-1614) was the seventh daughter of King Seonjo of Joseon (14th king of Joseon Dynasty). She married Gwon Dae-im and lived in Gung-dong, Guro-gu, Seoul. The region's name was changed 'Gong-dong' because they lived in a large house like a palace.

There are Andong Gwon clan's tombs and memorial hall. It is regarded as valuable research material. Also, there is Gungdong Eco park nearby and it is good for taking a walk. Tomb of Princess Jeongseon and Gung-dong Eco Park is one of the Nine Scenic Views of Guro (구로구경:九老九景).
