= Declaration of Helsinki (disambiguation) =

The Declaration of Helsinki is a document setting out ethical principles for human medical experimentation. The term may also refer to:

- Helsinki Accords
- Declaration of Helsinki, a Global Cities Dialogue declaration

== See also ==
- Helsinki Convention
