= Onsu-dong =

- Country: South Korea

Korean name
- Hangul: 온수동
- Hanja: 溫水洞
- RR: Onsu-dong
- MR: Onsu-dong

Onsu-dong (Korean: 온수동) is a dong (neighbourhood) of Guro District, Seoul, South Korea. It is a legal dong (법정동 法定洞) administered under its administrative dong (행정동 行政洞), Sugung-dong.

== See also ==
- Administrative divisions of South Korea
