= Anyangcheon Stream Walkway =

Walkway in Seoul, South Korea

- 안양천 산책로
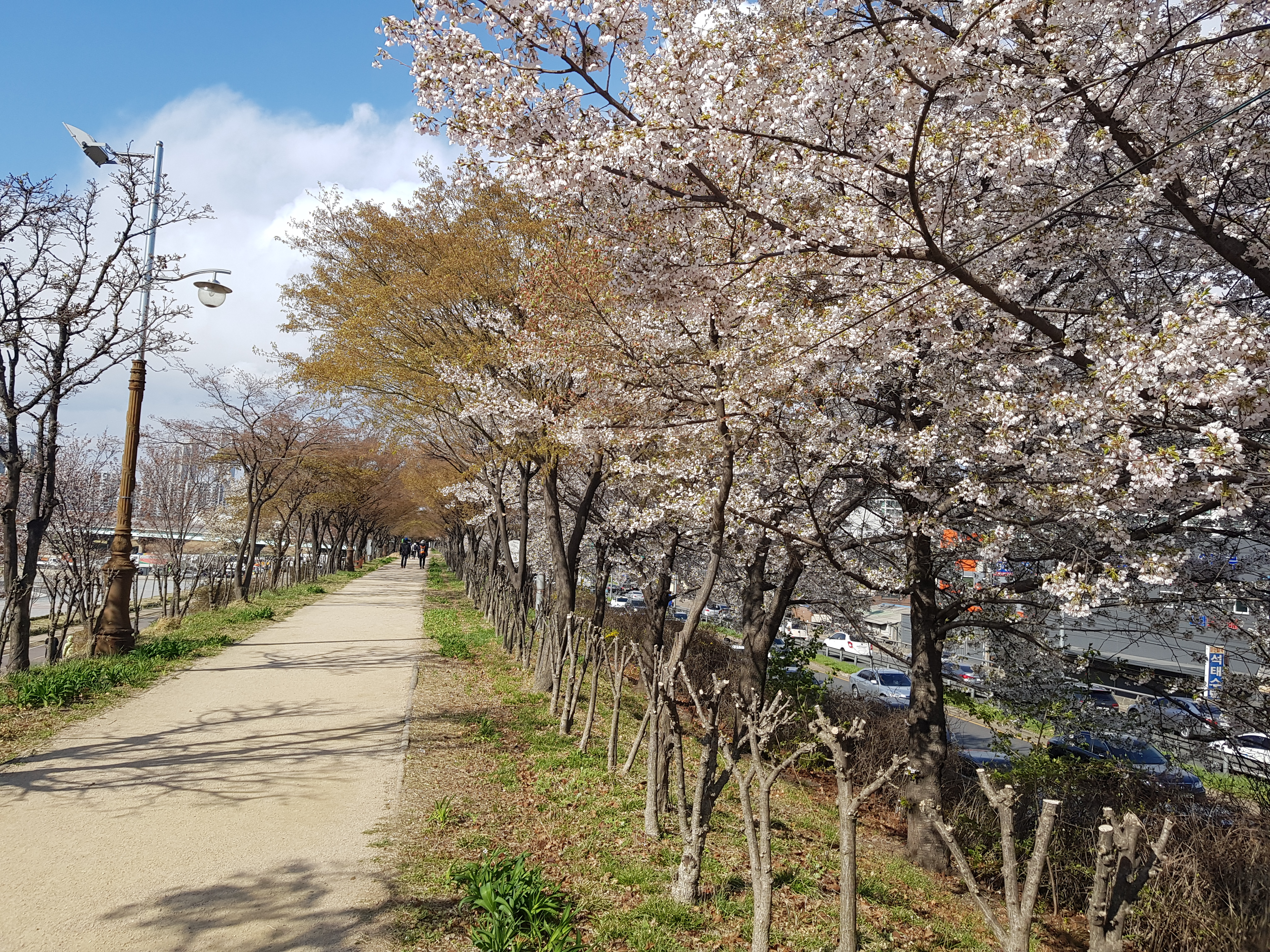
- The park in the spring (2018)
- Interactive map of Anyangcheon Stream Walkway
- Type: Park
- Location: Guro District, Seoul, South Korea
- Coordinates: 37°31′13″N 126°52′45″E

Korean name
- Hangul: 안양천 산책로
- Hanja: 安養川 散策路
- RR: Anyangcheon sanchaengno
- MR: Anyangch'ŏn sanch'aengno

The Anyangcheon Stream Walkway (Korean: 안양천 산책로) is a walkway located along the Anyangcheon river to Guro District, Seoul, South Korea. It connects several cities and districts in Gyeonggi Province and Seoul. It is one of the Nine Scenic Views of Guro (구로구경:九老九景), and its cherry blossom trees make it a very popular biking and hiking trail. The Anyangcheon Stream is an educational location where visitors can see various types of plants, fish, and migratory birds.

== Geography ==
The walkway follows the stream Anyangcheon, which begins west of Baekunsan in Uiwang, crosses through Gunpo, Anyang, and Gwangmyeong in Gyeonggi Province and the Geumcheon District, Guro District, Yangcheon District, and Yeongdeungpo District, Seoul. Finally, the stream meets the Han River near the Seongsan Bridge.
