= Pureun Arboretum =

Arboretum in Seoul, South Korea

- 푸른수목원
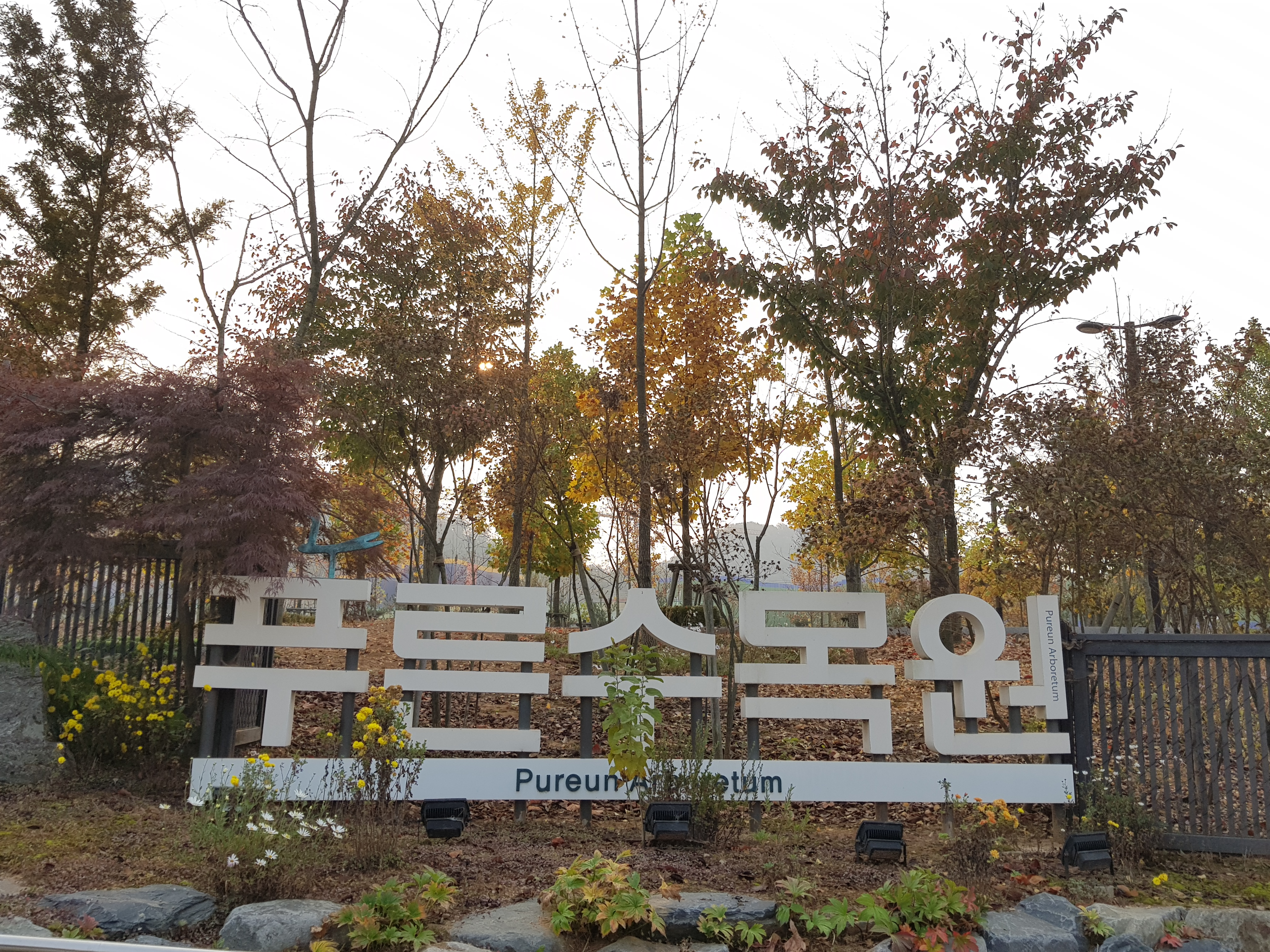
- Interactive map of Pureun Arboretum
- Type: Arboretum
- Location: Guro District, Seoul, South Korea
- Area: 103,354 square meters
- Opened: 2013
- Website: parks.seoul.go.kr/template/sub/pureun.do

- Pureun Arboretum
- Hangul: 푸른수목원
- Hanja: 푸른樹木園
- Revised Romanization: Pureun sumogwon
- McCune–Reischauer: P'urŭn sumogwŏn

The Pureun Arboretum is located at 43 Hang-dong, Guro-gu. It is the first arboretum in Seoul that opened in 2013.

It focuses on exhibits, experiences and education. There are over 2,100 different kinds of plants and 25 theme parks on 103,000 m^{2}, and education programs are also underway. It includes Herb garden, Rock garden, British garden, French garden and Maze Garden. It opens from 5 a.m. to 10 p.m.

And you can also walk along the Hang-dong Railroad Track near the arboretum. The Pureun Arboretum and Hang-dong Railroad Track is one of the Nine Scenic Views of Guro(구로구경:九老九景).
