= Yeonbyeon Street =

Return migration enclave in South Korea

Yeonbyeon Street (Korean: 연변거리; Hanja: 延边거리), named for Yanbian Korean Autonomous Prefecture in China, is an enclave of joseon-jok in Garibong-dong, Guro District, Seoul, South Korea. It is a return migration community of Koreans in China centralized around the street Uma 2-gil. It has also been called "Yanbian Joseon-jok Village" (옌벤조선족마을).

In 2008, the joseon-jok population of Garibong-dong was 7,712.

== History ==
The 1988 Summer Olympics, which were held in Seoul, were a watershed moment for South Korea. It was a significant boost to South Korea's image, and made it an attractive destination for immigration. As South Korea's economy continued to develop, the need for more manual labor increased, which led to an increase in work permits being issued. South Korea also established diplomatic relations with the People's Republic of China in 1992. Between these two events, ethnic Koreans from China began moving to the area on work permits and staying illegally after the conclusion of their contracts.

At the time, Guro District had relatively cheaper rent, which made it an attractive destination for immigrants. It was also near centers of manufacturing.

Between June 10 and July 31 of 1992, the South Korean Ministry of Justice encouraged illegal residents to voluntarily register. Around this time, 60,000 foreign workers were found to be living in South Korea illegally, with much of that number being joseon-jok.

Local businesses often used "Yanbian" in their name, referring to the prefecture in Northeast China with a high Korean population, which eventually earned the area the nickname of "Yanbian Joseon-jok Village" or "Yeonbyeon Street".
