= Yerim Design High School =

- 예림디자인고등학교
- 2 Ori-ro 21-gil, Guro-gu, Seoul; South Korea

Information
- Type: Private
- Established: 1966; 60 years ago
- Principal: Choi Soon-hee (최순희)
- Deputy Principal: Moon Han-il (문한일)
- Faculty: 46
- Gender: Girls
- Website: yerim.hs.kr

Yerim Design High School (Korean: 예림디자인고등학교) is a private girls high school located in Gung-dong, Guro-gu, Seoul.

== History ==
Yerim Design High School was founded on March 1, 1966 under the name Hangwang Commercial School (한광상업전수학교), before changing its name to Hangwang Girls' Commercial School (한광여자상업학교) on February 10, 1983. The school underwent three more name changes before changing it to its current Yerim Design High School on March 1, 2013. The current principal Choi Soon-hee was appointed on September 1, 2013 as the school's 15th principal.

== Departments ==
- Visual Design
- Web Design

== Principals ==
List of principals of Yerim Design High School:

- 1st: Jin In-kwon (1966.03.01—1976.12.20)
- 2nd: Lee Chang-je (1976.12.20—1979.04.02)
- 3rd: Shim Hyun-taek (1979.04.02—1984.02.10)
- 4th: Bae Byung-cheol (1984.02.10—1992.01.25)
- 5th: Jin In-kwon (1992.01.25—1995.03.02)
- 6th: Han Gyu-hwan (1995.03.02—1995.09.11)
- 7th: Shin Chang-kyu (1995.09.11—1998.03.02)
- 8th: Kim Hyun-cheol (1998.03.02—1999.03.01)
- 9th: Jin Chang-kwon (1999.03.01—2001.03.02)
- 10th: Han Gyu-hwan (2001.03.02—2004.09.01)
- 11th: Ha Yong-seon (2004.09.01—2007.09.01)
- 12th: Jo Heung-sik (2007.09.01—2008.03.01)
- 13th: Kim Jong-han (2008.03.01—2009.09.01)
- 14th: Lee Moon-ok (2009.09.01—2013.09.01)
- 15th: Choi Soon-hee (2013.09.01—present)
