= Cheonwang-dong =

- Interactive map of Cheonwang-dong
- Coordinates: 37.481°N 126.840°E
- Country: South Korea

Korean name
- Hangul: 천왕동
- Hanja: 天旺洞
- RR: Cheonwang-dong
- MR: Ch'ŏnwang-dong

Cheonwang-dong (Korean: 천왕동) is a dong, one part of Guro District, Seoul, South Korea. It is a legal dong (법정동) administered under its administrative dong (행정동), Oryu 2-dong. Cheonwang-dong has large apartments for Seoul citizens called SHIFT which means low-cost, long period (at most 20 years) rent.

== See also ==
- Administrative divisions of South Korea
