= D-Cube City =

Coordinates: 37.509677°N 126.890336°E

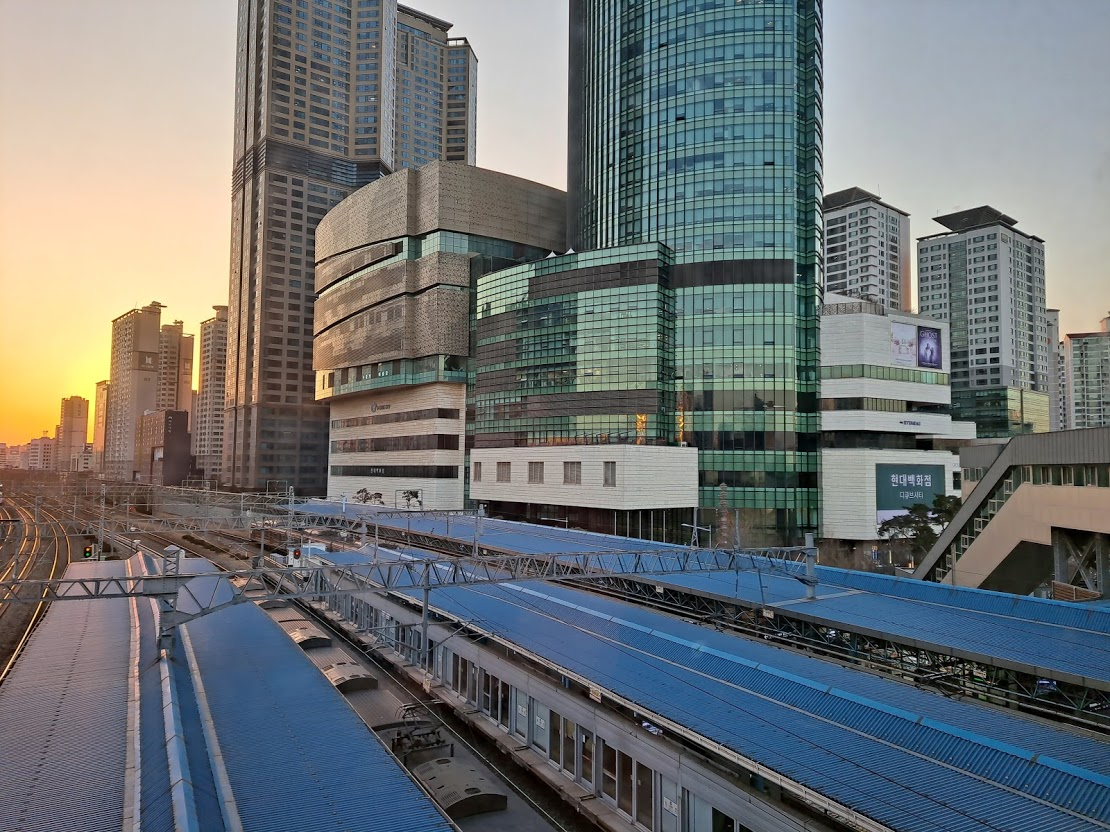
- D Cube City view from Sindorim Station

General information
- Type: Mixed-Use
- Location: 360-45 Sindorim-dong, Guro-gu, Seoul, Seoul, South Korea
- Construction started: 2007
- Completed: 2011
- Opened: 2011
- Cost: 1.3 trillion won
- Client: Daesung Industrial Co., Ltd.

Technical details
- Floor count: 51 Stories and 8 Basements
- Floor area: 350,054 sq. meters

Design and construction
- Architects: Samoo Architects & Engineers (Local Design/Executive/Residential Architect), The Jerde Partnership (Design Architects)
- Other designers: Landscape Architect: Oikos, Consultant: Mori Building Company
- Main contractor: Daesung Industrial Co., Ltd.
- Awards: 2012 MIPIM Awards Finalist, Shopping Centre Category

Website
- Official Website

D-Cube City (Korean: 디큐브시티) is a mega-complex in Seoul, Korea, which comprises department stores, office space, a park, an art center, a theatre, a hotel, restaurants, a theme park, and private residences. Daeseong Industrial Company constructed in 2011, and its main office is located here. This mixed use facility was developed by the same groups that developed Roppongi Hills in Tokyo.

== Architecture ==
D-Cube City's six acres of parks, plazas, and gardens are spread across the structure's stepped roofs. The steel and glass façade and open internal architecture provides an opportunity for the surrounding landscape to enter into the structure, both visually and literally as many stores open out onto the adjacent parks and gardens. Large atriums house many species of plants as well as internal water features and a six story waterfall. "Water flow" is one of the interior aesthetic themes.

During construction, an endangered species of frog, Kaloula borealis was found on the site. After discovering that the proposed structure's site was the frogs' habitat, the designers recreated and incorporated a five billion won ecology park into the landscape design as a new habitat.

== Construction and sale ==
Daeseong Industries had to expand its business through construction, retail distribution and hotel business, but its financial structure quickly became insolvent.

Daeseong Industries had around 400 billion won in loans until 2007, but at the end of 2011, its debt rose to 278.8 trillion won due to the repayment of the D-CUBE City Construction Project Financing (PF) KRW 977 billion. Accordingly, it sold the D-cube office, D-cube hotel in 2012, and the D-cube department store in November 2014.

== See also ==
- Namba Parks (Osaka)
- Canal City Hakata (Fukuoka)
- Riverwalk Kitakyushu (Fukuoka)
- Roppongi Hills (Tokyo)
