= Gaebong-dong =

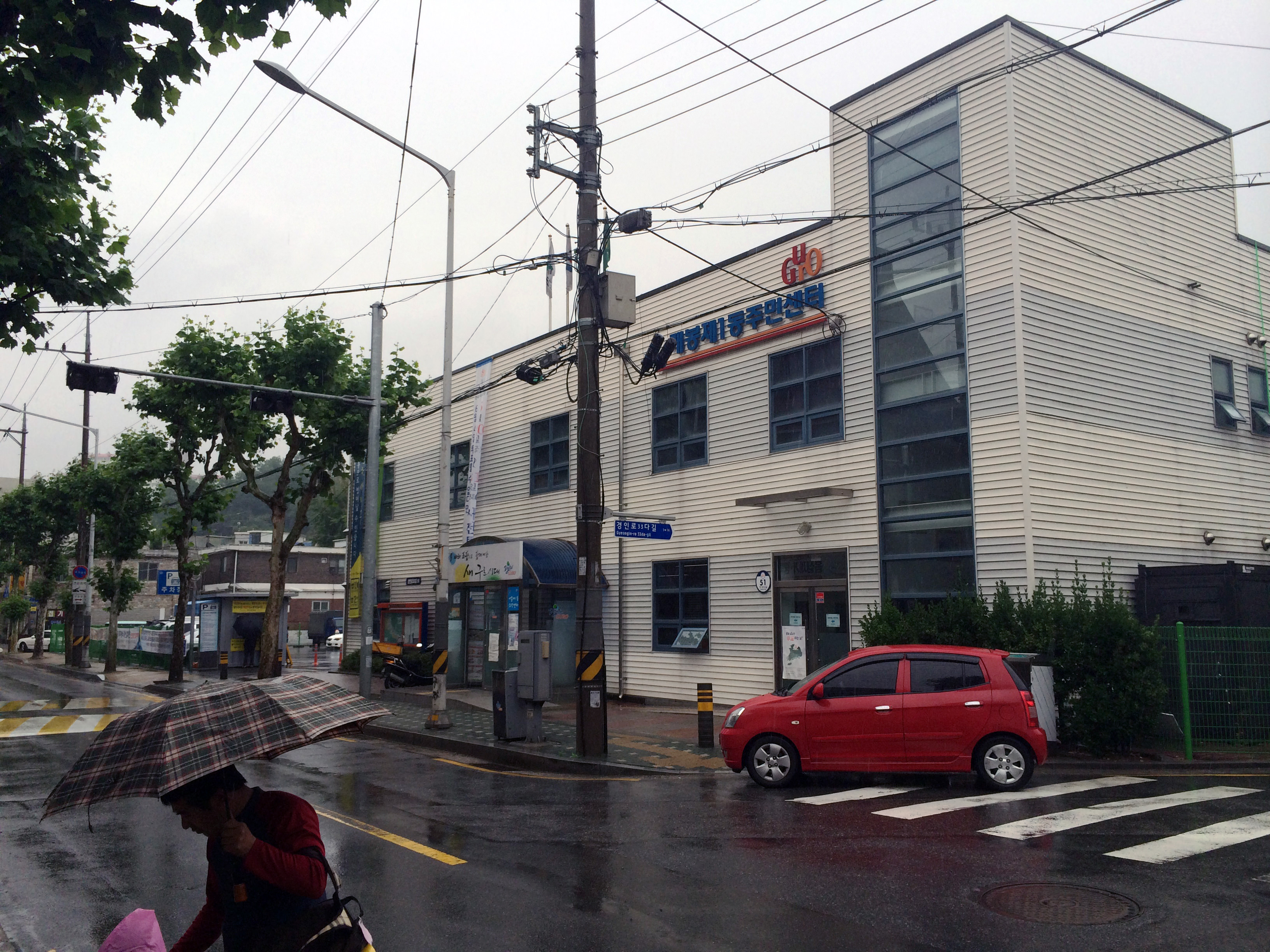
- Gaebong 1-dong_Community Service Center
- Country: South Korea

Area
  - Total: 2.93 km^{2} (1.13 sq mi)

Population (2001)
  - Total: 86,023
  - Density: 29,400/km^{2} (76,000/sq mi)

Korean name
- Hangul: 개봉동
- Hanja: 開峰洞
- RR: Gaebong-dong
- MR: Kaebong-dong

Gaebong-dong (Korean: 개봉동) is a dong (neighborhood) of Guro District, Seoul, South Korea.

== See also ==
- Administrative divisions of South Korea
