= Dongyang Mirae University =

Technical university in Seoul, South Korea

Coordinates: 37.5008°N 126.8675°E

- Hangul: 동양미래대학교
- Hanja: 東洋未來大學校
- RR: Dongyang mirae daehakgyo
- MR: Tongyang mirae taehakkyo

Dongyang Mirae University (Korean: 동양미래대학교; formerly Dongyang Technical College) is an industrial technical university in Seoul, South Korea. Its campus is in the city's Guro-gu district.

The undergraduate programs are broadly divided into the College of Engineering, the College of Humanities, and the Interdisciplinary Studies College, offering courses from associate degrees to master's degrees.

In particular, it is a university renowned for its engineering department, consistently achieving excellent results in Korea's university evaluations.

== Department ==
Dongyang Mirae University consists of 6 faculties and 24 departments.

- Department of Mechanical Engineering
- Department of Robotics and Automation Engineering
- Department of Electrical and Electronic Communication Engineering
- Department of Computer Engineering
- Department of Life and Environmental Engineering
- Department of Business Administration

== History ==
The college opened in 1965 as Dongyang Advanced Industrial Technical School (동양공업고등전문학교), and in 2012, the name was changed to Dongyang Mirae University (동양미래대학교).

== See also ==
- Education in South Korea
- List of colleges and universities in South Korea
