= Baegunsan (Ulsan) =

Mountain in South Korea

Highest point
- Elevation: 885 m (2,904 ft)
- Coordinates: 35°35′42″N 128°59′02″E

Geography
- Location: Ulsan, South Korea

Korean name
- Hangul: 백운산
- Hanja: 白雲山
- RR: Baegunsan
- MR: Paegunsan

Baegunsan (lit. White Cloud Mountain) is a mountain located in Duseomyeon, Ulju County, Ulsan, South Korea. It was previously named Albaksan (Korean: 알박산) during the Silla Dynsasy. It has an elevation of 885 m (2,904 ft).

== See also ==
- Geography of Korea
- List of South Korean tourist attractions
- List of mountains in Korea
