= Global Cities Dialogue =

The Global Cities Dialogue on Information Society (GCD), is a non-profit international association of Mayors and High Political Representatives (HPRs) who believe that the development of the Information Society should be for the benefit of all the citizens, communities and peoples of the world. They committed themselves to become actively involved in creating equal opportunities and access for all citizens built on the principle of sustainable development.

== History ==
The GCD was launched on November 23, 1999 Helsinki City Hall by twelve founding members who decided to commit themselves to the development of the information society for the benefit of all regardless of race, social position, creed, gender or age. Their commitment started by signing the Declaration of Helsinki for a Global Cities Dialogue on the Information Society.

Its current chairman is the mayor of Issy-les-Moulineaux (France), André Santini.

The initiative was born while the elected representative became aware that cities have a special place for the Information Society development. "It's the geographical, political, socioeconomic and cultural entities where millions of people live, work and directly exercise their rights as citizens and consumers. It's close to citizens and face the main questions, the changes and the opportunities of the information society, the local democracy to administrative departments" said Erkki Liikanen, the European commissioner who has sponsored the foundation of the network in 1999.

In 2000, the GCD's constitution was approved in Bremen, Germany. At the same year, the website was launched and the member-cities participated for the first time in the General Assembly Meeting in Sophia Antipolis, France.

In 2004, GCD started to develop its network in Asia and in Latin America.

Since its creation, the GCD has been always active through different conferences and events about new technologies. It participated in the World Summit Of Cities And Local Authorities On The Information Society in Bilbao (2005), World e-Democracy Forum in Issy-les-Moulineaux (2006) and Lyon Conference For Digital Solidarity (2008). Currently there are over 200 cities participating in the program, many are allowed to participate without attending due to usage of online communication technology, such as skype.

Over the last decade it has invited nearly 200 cities across the five continents.

== Organisation ==
The GCD is composed by a chair city, a steering committee and the member cities. It's represented by the mayor or the HPR of the elected city. The appointed is elected for two years during the General Assembly Meeting (GAM).

Each city should name a representative, called Sherpa, in order to delegate it. Sherpas meet regularly in order to decide about several projects of GCD, the application of some projects or the organization of the GAM.

The General Assembly is composed of mayors or nominated HPR of the member cities. The meeting is organized once a year and its role is to oversee the overall policy and actions of GCD.

GCD has three main projects currently :

- The reduction of the digital divide.
- The setting-up of the sustainable environmental technologies.
- The mobile technologies.

=== Innovations ===
The GCD has always encouraged its members in the application of ICT for the benefits of their citizens.

The membership committed personally mayors of the member cities in order to improve the daily life of its citizens thanks to ICT. Examples include:

- e-Book : Issy-les-Moulineaux (France) allows citizen to borrow e-books from its public libraries since January 2010.
- Mobile payment : It's now possible to pay bus ticket by sms in Antwerp (Belgium), Luxembourg and Helsinki (Finland). The system PaybyPhone has also been introduced in some cities as Issy-les-Moulineaux (France), Cologne (Germany) and Vilnius (Lithuania). Citizens can pay their parking by sms instead of the park machine.
- Wi-Fi zones : Some cities as Barcelona (Spain), Bologna (Italy), Metz (France) or Lyon (France) has covered its cities with the Wi-Fi access in order to facilitate the access to Internet.
- Information by sms : The city of Belo Horizonte (Brazil) has thought of a system called "Hello Citizen". Each resident can receive cultural or educative information by sms. In Boston (USA), citizens are allows to testify thanks to the system "Crimestoppers".
- Tourist information : It's available by phone in Bremen and Buenos Aires

=== Member cities (1999–2009) ===
Country	Cities	Country	Cities
Argentina	Buenos Aires, Curuzú Cuatiá	Australia	Hume, Victoria, Whittlesea
Belgium	Antwerp, Brussels, Frameries, Seneffe	Benin	Cotonou
Bosnia	Sarajevo	Brazil	Belo Horizonte, Pirai, Porto Alegre, Sao Bernardo do Campo
Bulgaria	Nova Zagora, Panagyurishte	Burkina Faso	Ouagadougou
Canada	Bromont, Moncton	Chile	Puerto Montt, Santiago, Viña del Mar
China	Dadong, Xiang Fang	Colombia	Bogotá
Congo	Dolisie	Costa Rica	Heredia, San Joaquín de Flores
Croatia	Poreč	Czech Republic	Hluboká nad Vltavou, Hradec Králové, Jihlava, Olomouc, Ostrava, Pardubice, Plzeň, Prague, Třinec
El Salvador	Sonsonate	Estonia	Kuressaare, Paide, Tartu
Ecuador	Quito	Finland	Helsinki
France	Bordeaux, Issy-les-Moulineaux, Le Lamentin, Lyon, Marseille, Metz, Parthenay, Vandoeuvre-lès-Nancy	Germany	Berlin, Bremen, Cologne
Greece	Athens	Guatemala	Guatemala City
Honduras	Choluteca, San Lorenzo in Valle	Hungary	Kecskemét
India	Vadodara	Italy	Bari, Bologna, Carini, Catania, Celle Ligure, Cento, Florence, Rome, Segrate, Siena, Verona
Japan	Okayama	South Korea	Chuncheon, Gumi, Guro District, No-Won
Latvia	Liepāja, Riga, Ventspils	Lithuania	Vilnius
Luxembourg	Luxembourg	Mali	Bamako, Baye, Bougouni, Commune III Bamako, Commune IV Bamako, Dilly, Kayes, Koutiala, Sangha, Segou
Malta	Birkirkara	Morocco	Agdal Ryad
New-Zealand	Wellington	Nicaragua	Managua
Peru	Chorrillos, Independencia, Lima, Lince, Lurin, Miraflores, Oyón, Rioja	Philippines	Naga
Poland	Częstochowa, Gdańsk, Katowice, Lublin, Ostrów Wielkopolski, Puławy, Sopot, Swarzędz, Tarnów, Wałbrzych, Wrocław, Zakopane	Portugal	Abrantes, Castelo, Branco
Romania	Alba Iulia, Bacău, Galați	Senegal	Dakar, Goudomp, Rufisque, Thiès
Serbia	Jagodina, Podgorica	Slovakia	Banská Bystrica, Bratislava, Martin, Moldava nad Bodvou, Poprad
Slovenia	Celje, Koper, Ljubljana, Maribor, Nova Gorica, Velenje	Spain	Barcelona, Bilbao, Cerdanyola del Vallès, Getafe, Gijón, Jun, Madrid, Málaga, San Sebastián de La Gomera, Telde, Valencia, Zamora
Sweden	Bollnäs, Karlskrona, Ronneby	Switzerland	Geneva
Taiwan	Tainan	Turkey	Yalova
Ukraine	Kharkiv, Khmelnytskyi, Kyiv, Kovel, Kremenchuk, Lviv, Mykolaiv, Rivne, Shepetivka	United Arab Emirates	Dubai
United-Kingdom	East Riding, Edinburgh, Gateshead, London, London-Lewisham, Manchester, Newcastle Upon Tyne, North Tyneside, South Tyneside, Southampton, Sunderland	Uruguay	Montevideo, Rio Negro, Tacuarembó
United States	Arvada, Boston, New Smyrna Beach, Madison, Phoenix, San Francisco, Seattle		
