= Garibong-dong =

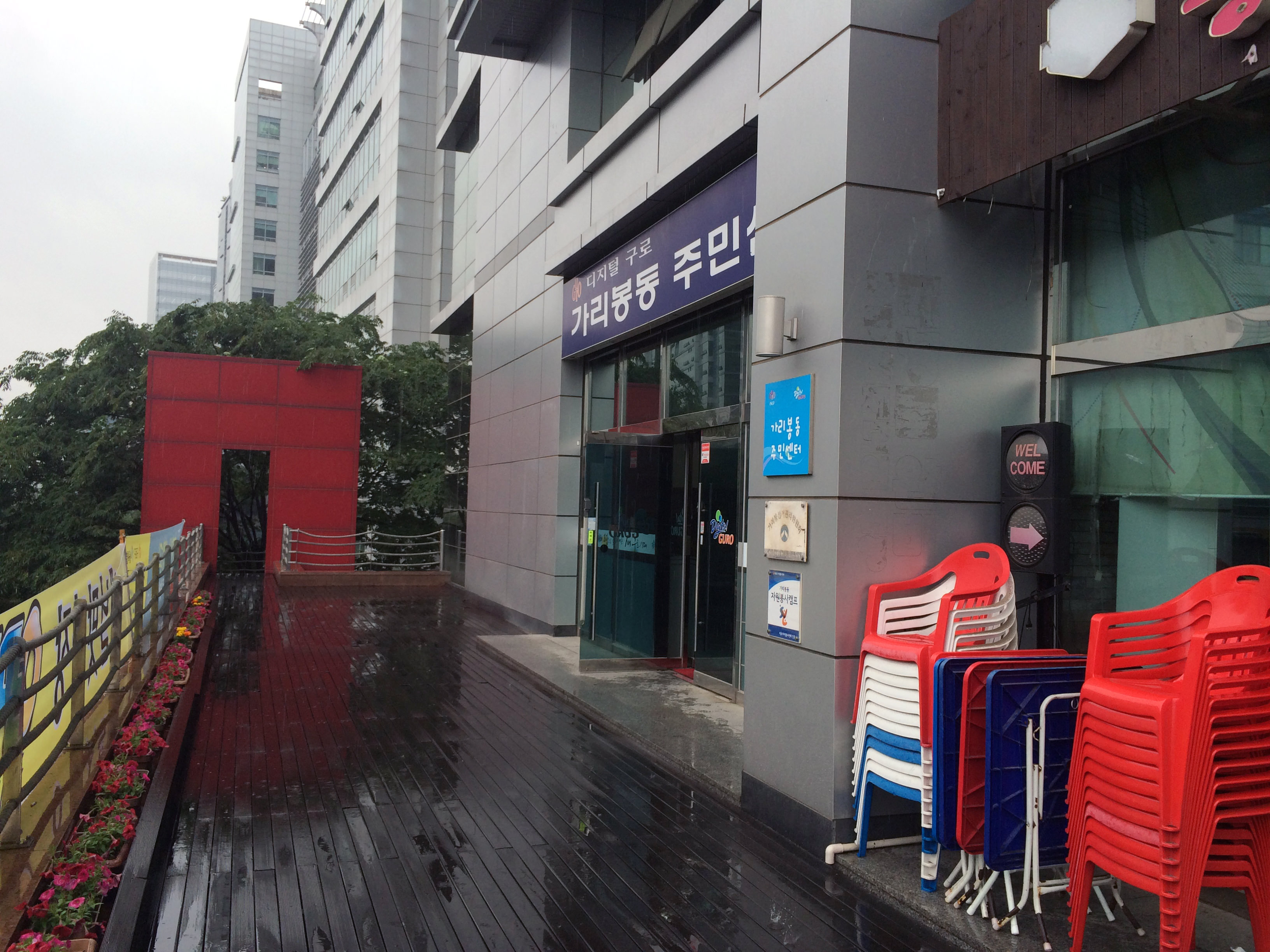
- Garibong-dong Community Service Center
- Interactive map of Garibong-dong
- Country: South Korea

Area
  - Total: 0.40 km^{2} (0.15 sq mi)

Population (2001)
  - Total: 18,598
  - Density: 46,000/km^{2} (120,000/sq mi)

Korean name
- Hangul: 가리봉동
- Hanja: 加里峰洞
- RR: Garibong-dong
- MR: Karibong-dong

Garibong-dong (Korean: 가리봉동) is a dong (neighborhood) of Guro District, Seoul, South Korea.

Gasan-dong in Geumcheon District used to be part of this neighborhood, but it was split from Garibong as Geumcheon District was established in 1995.

== See also ==
- Administrative divisions of South Korea
