= Gung-dong =

- Country: South Korea

Korean name
- Hangul: 궁동
- Hanja: 宮洞
- RR: Gung-dong
- MR: Kung-dong

Gung-dong (Korean: 궁동) is a dong (neighborhood) of Guro District, Seoul, South Korea. It is a legal dong (법정동) administered under its administrative dong (행정동), Sugung-dong.

== See also ==
- Administrative divisions of South Korea
