= Garibong =

Mountain in South Korea

Highest point
- Elevation: 1,059.7 m (3,477 ft)

Geography
- Location: South Korea

Korean name
- Hangul: 가리봉
- Hanja: 加里峰
- RR: Garibong
- MR: Karibong

Garibong (Korean: 가리봉) is a mountain in Inje County, Gangwon Province, South Korea. It has an elevation of 1,059.7 m (3,477 ft).

== See also ==
- List of mountains in Korea
