= Hang-dong =

- Country: South Korea

Korean name
- Hangul: 항동
- Hanja: 航洞
- RR: Hang-dong
- MR: Hang-dong

Hang-dong (Korean: 항동) is a dong of Guro District, Seoul, South Korea. It is a legal dong (법정동) administered under its administrative dong (행정동), Oryu 2-dong.

== See also ==
- Administrative divisions of South Korea
