= Sugung-dong =

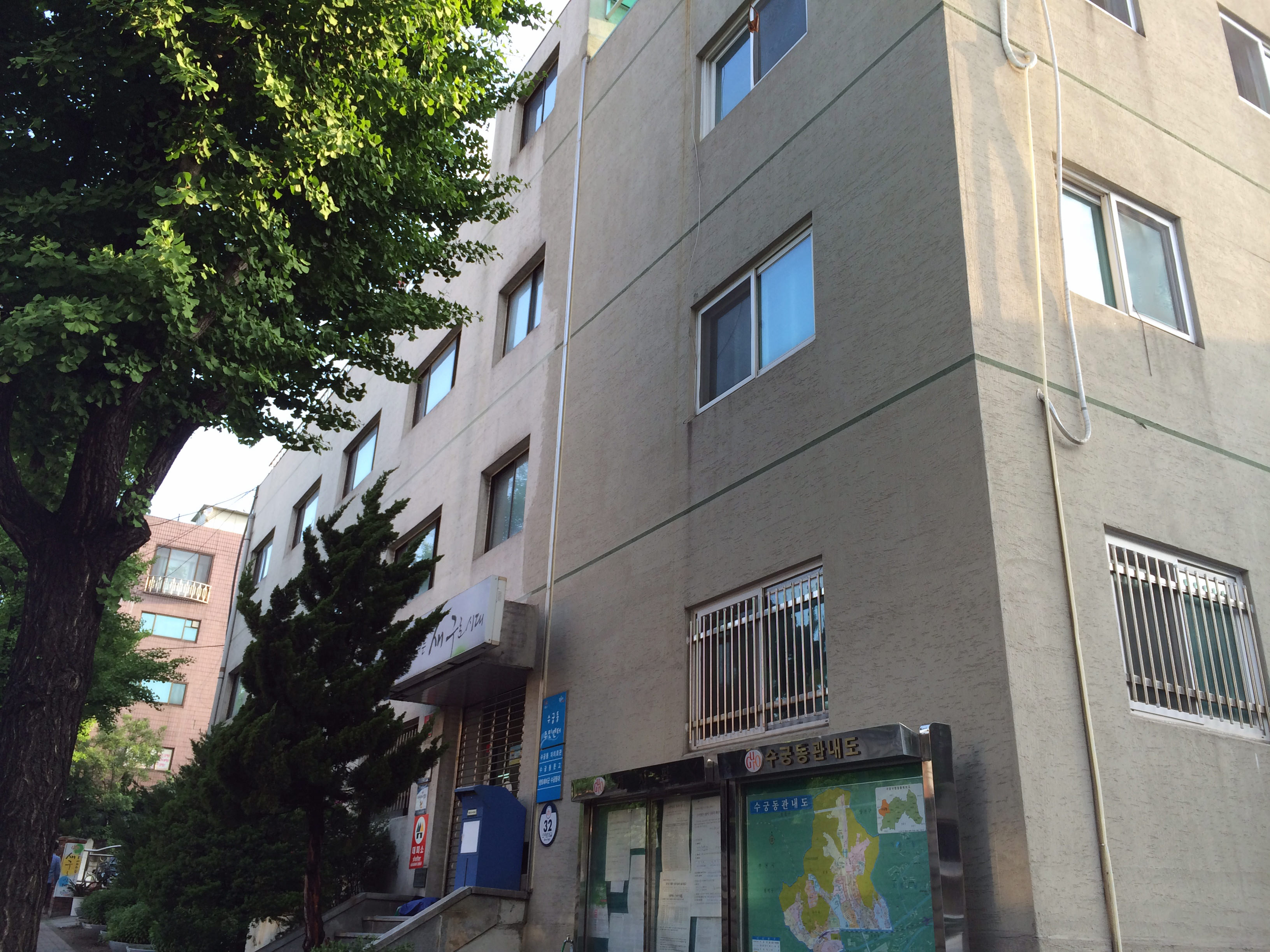
- Sugung-dong Community Service Center (Guro-gu)
- Interactive map of Sugung-dong
- Country: South Korea

Area
  - Total: 2.67 km^{2} (1.03 sq mi)

Population (2001)
  - Total: 24,711
  - Density: 9,260/km^{2} (24,000/sq mi)

Korean name
- Hangul: 수궁동
- Hanja: 水宮洞
- RR: Sugung-dong
- MR: Sugung-dong

Sugung-dong (Korean: 수궁동) is a dong (neighbourhood) of Guro District, Seoul, South Korea.

== See also ==
- Administrative divisions of South Korea
